= Business career of Elon Musk =

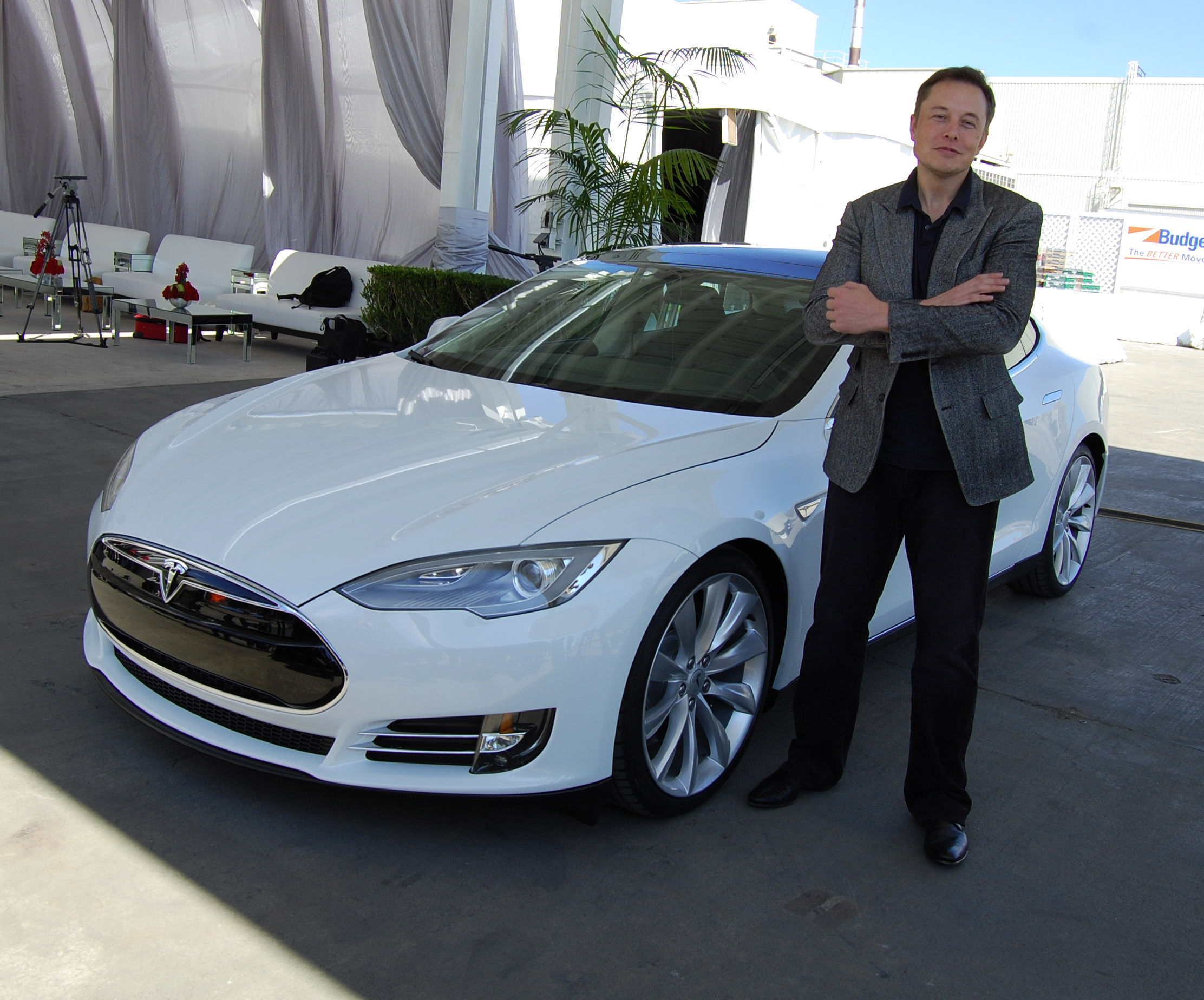
Musk next to a Tesla Model S in 2011

Elon Musk is a businessman and entrepreneur best known as the CEO of the automotive company Tesla, Inc. and the founder and CEO of the space company SpaceX. Musk is also known for his ownership of technology company X Corp. and his role in the founding of The Boring Company, xAI, Neuralink, and OpenAI.

In 1995, Musk co-founded what would later be known as Zip2, later selling the company to Compaq for $307 million in 1999. Receiving $22 million in the process, Musk used $12 million of the proceeds to co-found the e-payment company X.com that same year. In 2000, X.com merged with the online bank Confinity and was rebranded as PayPal. In 2002, Musk received $176 million as PayPal's largest shareholder when eBay acquired PayPal, and would much later purchase the X.com domain from PayPal, with the intention of creating an "everything app". In 2004, with an investment of $6.3 million, Musk then became the chairman and majority shareholder of Tesla. In 2016, Musk co-founded the neurotechnology startup company Neuralink, with an investment of $100 million, followed by founding the Boring Company to construct tunnels. In 2022, Musk completed his acquisition of Twitter, becoming the CEO of Twitter, prior to its rebranding to X.

Beginning with his involvement with space exploration companies in early 2001, he founded SpaceX in 2002, with the company attempting the first rocket launch in 2006. Since 2019, SpaceX been developing Starship, a reusable, super heavy-lift launch vehicle, and in 2015, they began development of the Starlink for satellite Internet access. Having sent Starlink terminals to Ukraine in 2022, Musk refused to block Russian state media on Starlink and later faced criticism over denying access over Crimea.

With Tesla, he assumed leadership as CEO and product architect in 2008. In 2018, Musk was sued by the SEC for a tweet stating that funding had been secured for potentially taking Tesla private, later settling with the SEC, with Musk stepping down as Tesla chairman while remaining its CEO. Shareholders also filed a lawsuit over the tweet, and in 2023 a jury found Musk and Tesla not liable. As of 2019, Musk was the longest-tenured CEO of any automotive manufacturer globally, and under Musk, Tesla has also constructed multiple lithium-ion battery and electric vehicle factories, named Gigafactories.

== Zip2 ==
External videos
- Musk speaks of his early business experience during a 2014 commencement speech at University of Southern California on YouTube

In 1995, Elon, his brother Kimbal, and Greg Kouri founded Global Link Information Network, later renamed Zip2. The company developed an Internet city guide with maps, directions, and yellow pages, and marketed it to newspapers. They worked at a small rented office in Palo Alto, with Musk coding the website every night. Musk and Kimbal's immigration statuses during this period were described by Musk as a "gray area", although Kimbal maintained they were working as illegal immigrants. A Washington Post exposé from October 2024 reported Musk worked illegally while building the company, citing an email from Musk submitted as evidence during a 2005 defamation trial and the funding agreement from venture capital firm Mohr Davidow Ventures.

Eventually, Zip2 obtained contracts with The New York Times and the Chicago Tribune. The brothers persuaded the board of directors to abandon a merger with Citysearch; however, Musk's attempts to become CEO were thwarted. Compaq acquired Zip2 for $307 million in cash in February 1999, and Musk received $22 million for his 7 percent share.

== X.com and PayPal ==
In March 1999, Musk co-founded X.com, an online financial services and e-mail payment company with $12 million of the money he made from the Compaq acquisition. X.com was one of the first online banks that was federally insured, and over 200,000 customers joined in its initial months of operation.

Musk's friends expressed skepticism about the naming of the online bank, fearing it might have been mistaken for a pornographic site. Musk brushed off their concerns, emphasizing that the name was meant to be straightforward, memorable, and easy to type. Additionally, he was fond of the email addresses derived from it, such as "e@x.com". Although Musk founded the company, investors regarded him as inexperienced and replaced him with Intuit CEO Bill Harris by the end of the year.

In 2000, X.com merged with the online bank Confinity to avoid competition, as the latter's money-transfer service PayPal was more popular than X.com's service. Musk then returned as CEO of the merged company. His preference for Microsoft over Unix-based software caused a rift among the company's employees, and eventually led Confinity co-founder Peter Thiel to resign. With the company suffering from compounding technological issues and the lack of a cohesive business model, the board ousted Musk and replaced him with Thiel in September 2000. (Note: Musk remained on the board and served as an advisor.) Under Thiel, the company focused on the money-transfer service and was renamed PayPal in 2001.

In 2002, PayPal was acquired by eBay for $1.5 billion in stock, of which Musk—PayPal's largest shareholder with 11.7% of shares—received $176 million. In 2017, more than 15 years later, Musk purchased the X.com domain from PayPal for its "sentimental value". In 2022, Musk discussed a goal of creating "X, the everything app".

== SpaceX ==
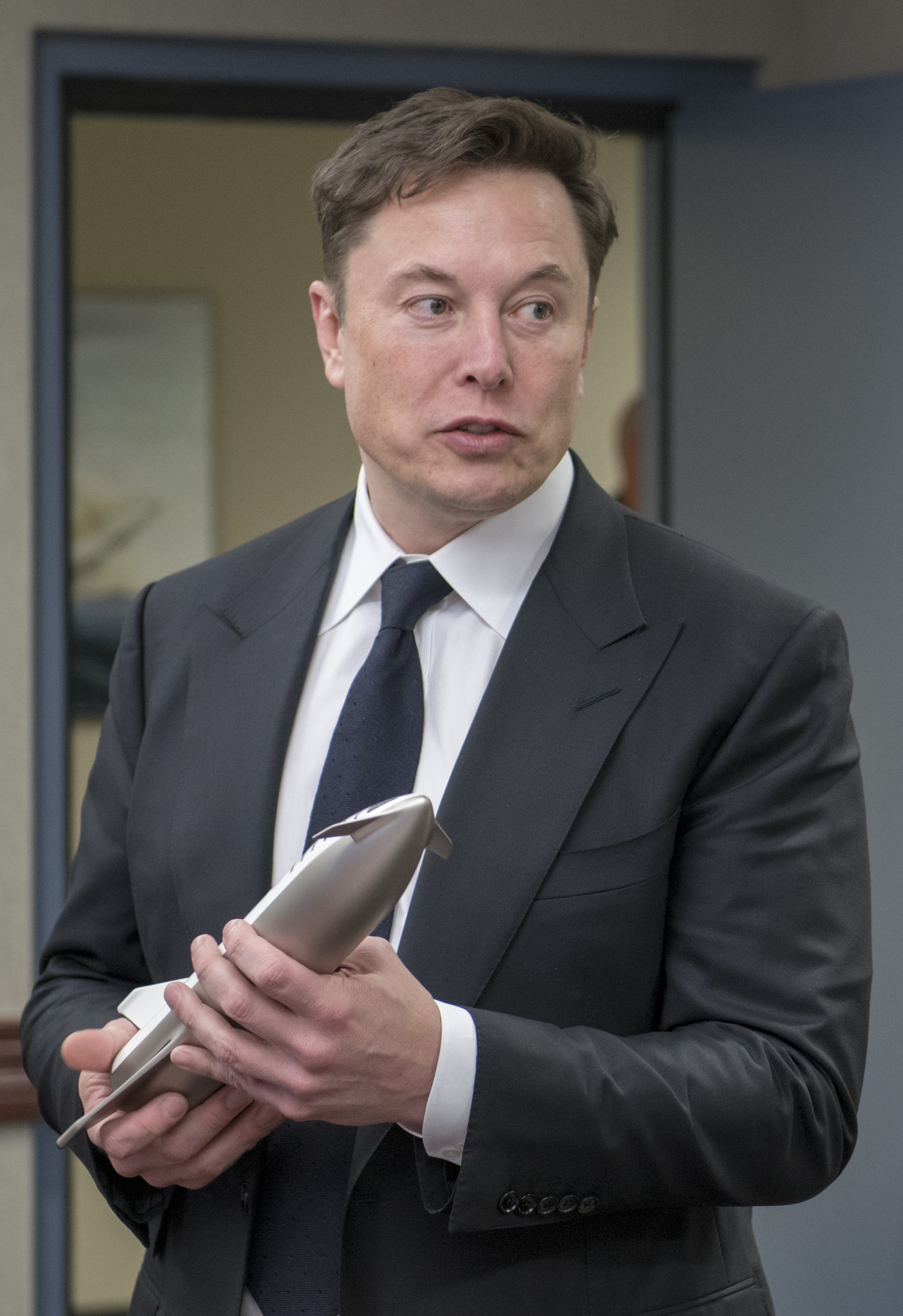
Musk explains Starship capabilities to leaders of North American Aerospace Defense Command, U.S. Northern Command, and Air Force Space Command in 2019 during a trip to Colorado Springs, Colorado.

In early 2001, Musk became involved with the nonprofit Mars Society and discussed funding plans to place a growth-chamber for plants on Mars. In October that year, he traveled to Moscow, Russia with Jim Cantrell, Adeo Ressi, and future Administrator of NASA, Michael D. Griffin to buy refurbished intercontinental ballistic missiles (ICBMs) that could send the greenhouse payloads into space. He met with the companies Lavochkin and ISC Kosmotras; however, Musk was seen as a novice and the group returned to the United States without an agreement to purchase Russian launch services. In February 2002, the group returned to Russia to look for three ICBMs. They had another meeting with ISC Kosmotras and were offered one rocket for $8 million, which Musk rejected. He instead decided to start a company that could build affordable rockets. With $100 million of his own money, Musk founded SpaceX in May 2002 and became the company's CEO and chief engineer.

SpaceX attempted its first launch of the Falcon 1 rocket in 2006. Although the rocket failed to reach Earth orbit, it was awarded a Commercial Orbital Transportation Services program contract from NASA, now led by Griffin as Administrator. After two more failed attempts that nearly caused Musk and his companies to go bankrupt, SpaceX succeeded in launching the Falcon 1 into orbit in 2008. Later that year, SpaceX received a $1.6 billion Commercial Resupply Services contract from NASA for 12 flights of its Falcon 9 rocket and Dragon spacecraft to the International Space Station (ISS), replacing the Space Shuttle after its 2011 retirement. In 2012, the Dragon vehicle docked with the ISS, a first for a commercial spacecraft.

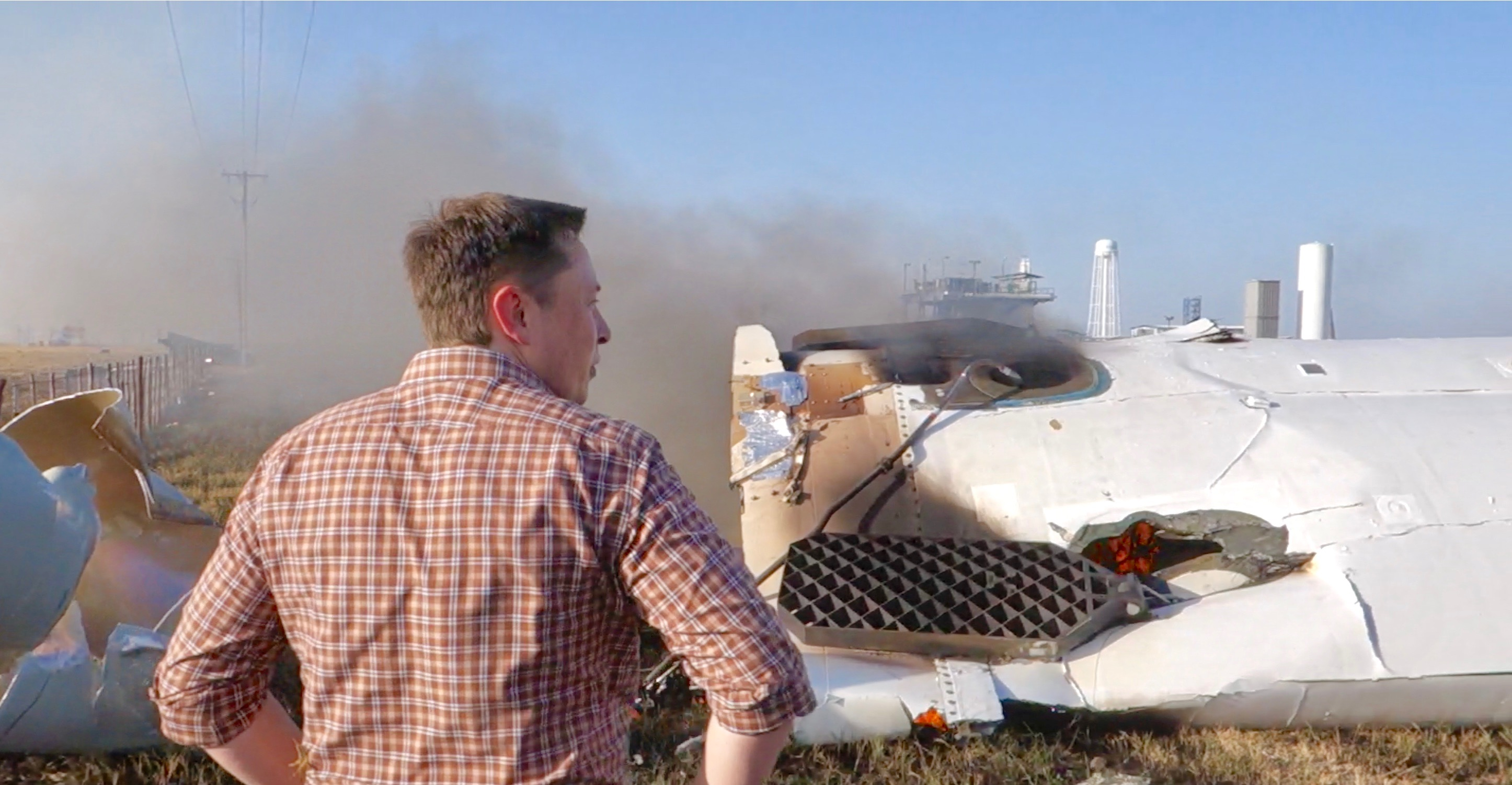
Musk examining F9R Dev1 debris in 2014

Working towards its goal of reusable rockets, in 2015 SpaceX successfully landed the first stage of a Falcon 9 on a land platform. Later landings were achieved on autonomous spaceport drone ships, an ocean-based recovery platform. In 2018, SpaceX launched the Falcon Heavy; the inaugural mission carried Musk's personal Tesla Roadster as a dummy payload.

Since 2019, SpaceX has been developing Starship, a reusable, super heavy-lift launch vehicle intended to replace the Falcon 9 and the Falcon Heavy. In 2020, SpaceX launched its first crewed flight, the Demo-2, becoming the first private company to place astronauts into orbit and dock a crewed spacecraft with the ISS. In 2024, NASA awarded SpaceX an $843 million contract to deorbit the ISS at the end of its lifespan.

=== Starlink ===
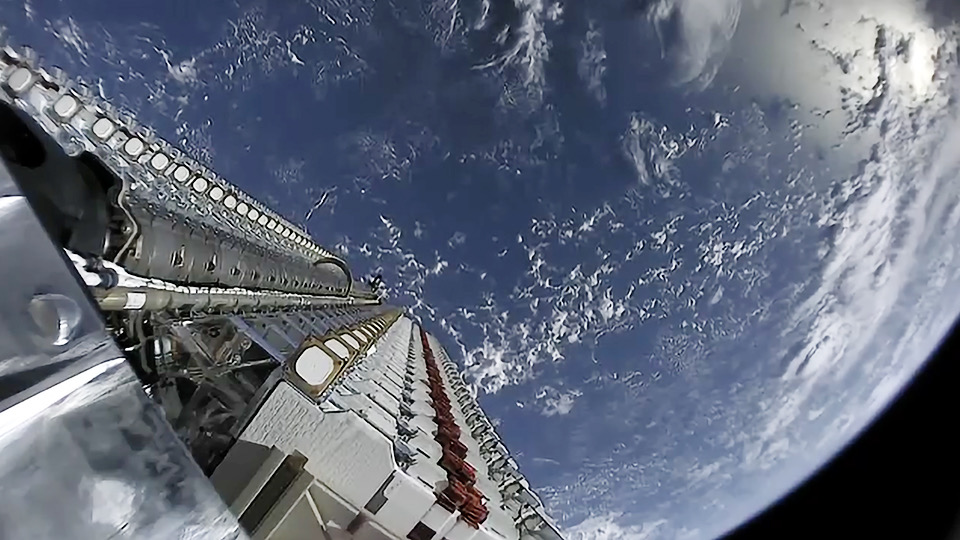
50 Starlink satellites shortly before deployment to low Earth orbit, 2019

In 2015, SpaceX began development of the Starlink constellation of low Earth orbit satellites to provide satellite Internet access, with the first two prototype satellites launched in February 2018. A second set of test satellites, and the first large deployment of a piece of the constellation, occurred in May 2019, when the first 60 operational satellites were launched. The total cost of the decade-long project to design, build, and deploy the constellation was estimated by SpaceX in 2020 to be $10 billion. (Note: SpaceX received nearly $900 million in Federal Communications Commission subsidies for Starlink.) Some critics, including the International Astronomical Union, have alleged that Starlink blocks the view of the sky and poses a collision threat to spacecraft.

During the Russian invasion of Ukraine, Musk sent Starlink terminals to Ukraine to provide Internet access and communication. In October 2022, Musk stated that about 20,000 satellite terminals had been donated to Ukraine, together with free data transfer subscriptions, which cost SpaceX $80 million. After asking the United States Department of Defense to pay for further units and future subscriptions on behalf of Ukraine, Musk publicly stated that SpaceX would continue to provide Starlink to Ukraine for free, at a yearly cost to itself of $400 million. At the same time, Musk refused to block Russian state media on Starlink, declaring himself "a free speech absolutist".

In September 2022, Ukraine asked for the activation of Starlink satellites over Crimea to attack Russian naval vessels located at the port Sevastopol; Musk denied the request, citing concerns that Russia would respond with a nuclear attack.

== Tesla ==
Tesla, Inc., originally Tesla Motors, was incorporated in July 2003 by Martin Eberhard and Marc Tarpenning. Both men played active roles in the company's early development prior to Musk's involvement. Musk led the Series A round of investment in February 2004; he invested $6.35 million, became the majority shareholder, and joined Tesla's board of directors as chairman. Musk took an active role within the company and oversaw Roadster product design, but was not deeply involved in day-to-day business operations.

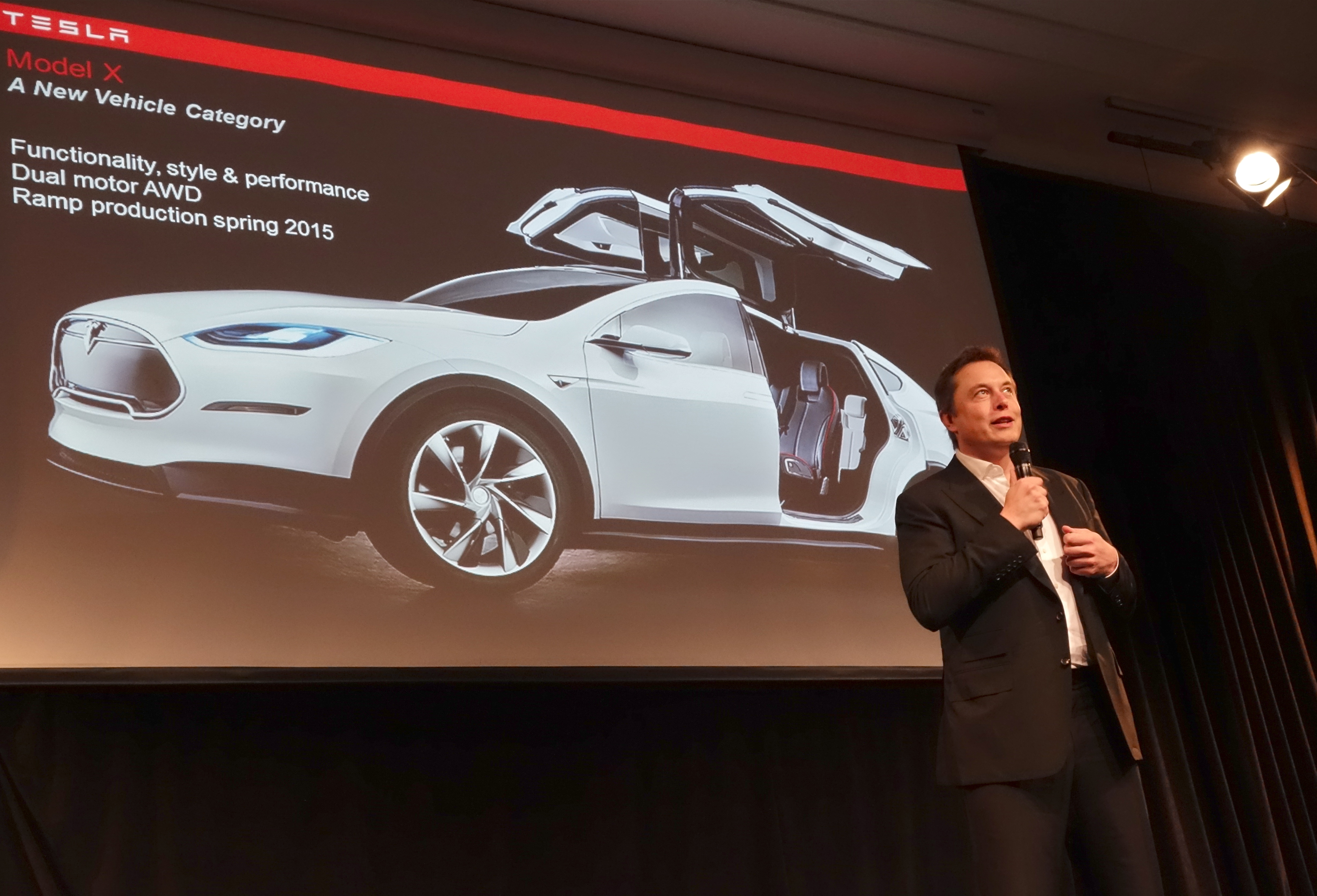
Musk before a Model X at the 2014 Tesla Inc. annual shareholder meeting

Following a series of escalating conflicts in 2007, and the 2008 financial crisis, Eberhard was ousted from the firm. Musk assumed leadership of the company as CEO and product architect in 2008. A 2009 lawsuit settlement with Eberhard designated Musk as a Tesla co-founder, along with Tarpenning and two others. As of 2019, Musk was the longest-tenured CEO of any automotive manufacturer globally. In 2021, Musk nominally changed his title to "Technoking" while retaining his position as CEO.

Tesla began delivery of the Roadster, an electric sports car, in 2008. With sales of about 2,500 vehicles, it was the first mass production all-electric car to use lithium-ion battery cells. Tesla began delivery of its four-door Model S sedan in 2012. A crossover, the Model X was launched in 2015. A mass-market sedan, the Model 3, was released in 2017. From 2015 to 2018, Jon McNeill served as Tesla’s president of global sales and service, and in 2017, he also assumed responsibility for government relations. McNeill later wrote a book about his time at Tesla called The Algorithm. In 2020, the Model 3 became the all-time bestselling plug-in electric car worldwide, and in June 2021 it became the first electric car to sell 1 million units globally. A fifth vehicle, the Model Y crossover, was launched in 2020, and in December 2023, became the best-selling vehicle of any type, as well as the all-time best-selling electric car. The Cybertruck, an all-electric pickup truck, was unveiled in 2019, and delivered in November 2023. Under Musk, Tesla has also constructed multiple lithium-ion battery and electric vehicle factories, named Gigafactories.

Since its initial public offering in 2010, Tesla stock has risen significantly; it became the most valuable carmaker in summer 2020, and it entered the S&P 500 later that year. In October 2021, it reached a market capitalization of $1 trillion, the sixth company in US history to do so. In November 2021, Musk proposed on Twitter to sell some of his Tesla stock. After more than 3.5 million Twitter accounts supported the sale, Musk sold $6.9 billion of Tesla stock within a week, and a total of $16.4 billion by year end, reaching the 10% target. In February 2022, The Wall Street Journal reported that both Musk and his brother Kimbal were under investigation by the Securities and Exchange Commission (SEC) for possible insider trading related to the sale. In 2022, Musk unveiled Optimus, a robot being developed by Tesla. In June 2023, Musk met with Indian prime minister Narendra Modi in New York City, stating he was interested in investing in India "as soon as humanly possible".

=== SEC and shareholder lawsuits regarding tweets ===
In 2018, Musk was sued by the SEC for a tweet stating that funding had been secured for potentially taking Tesla private. (Note: Musk stated he was considering taking Tesla private at a price of $420 a share, an alleged reference to marijuana. Members of Tesla's board and rapper Azealia Banks alleged that Musk may have been under the influence of recreational drugs when he wrote the tweet.) The lawsuit characterized the tweet as false, misleading, and damaging to investors, and sought to bar Musk from working as CEO of publicly traded companies. Two days later, Musk settled with the SEC, without admitting or denying the SEC's allegations. As a result, Musk and Tesla were fined $20 million each, and Musk was forced to step down for three years as Tesla chairman but was able to remain as CEO. Shareholders filed a lawsuit over the tweet, and in February 2023, a jury found Musk and Tesla not liable. Musk has stated in interviews that he does not regret posting the tweet that triggered the SEC investigation.

In 2019, Musk stated in a tweet that Tesla would build half a million cars that year. The SEC reacted by asking a court to hold him in contempt for violating the terms of the 2018 settlement agreement. A joint agreement between Musk and the SEC eventually clarified the previous agreement details, including a list of topics about which Musk needed preclearance. In 2020, a judge blocked a lawsuit that claimed a tweet by Musk regarding Tesla stock price ("too high imo") violated the agreement. Freedom of Information Act (FOIA)-released records showed that the SEC concluded Musk had subsequently violated the agreement twice by tweeting regarding "Tesla's solar roof production volumes and its stock price".

=== SolarCity and Tesla Energy ===
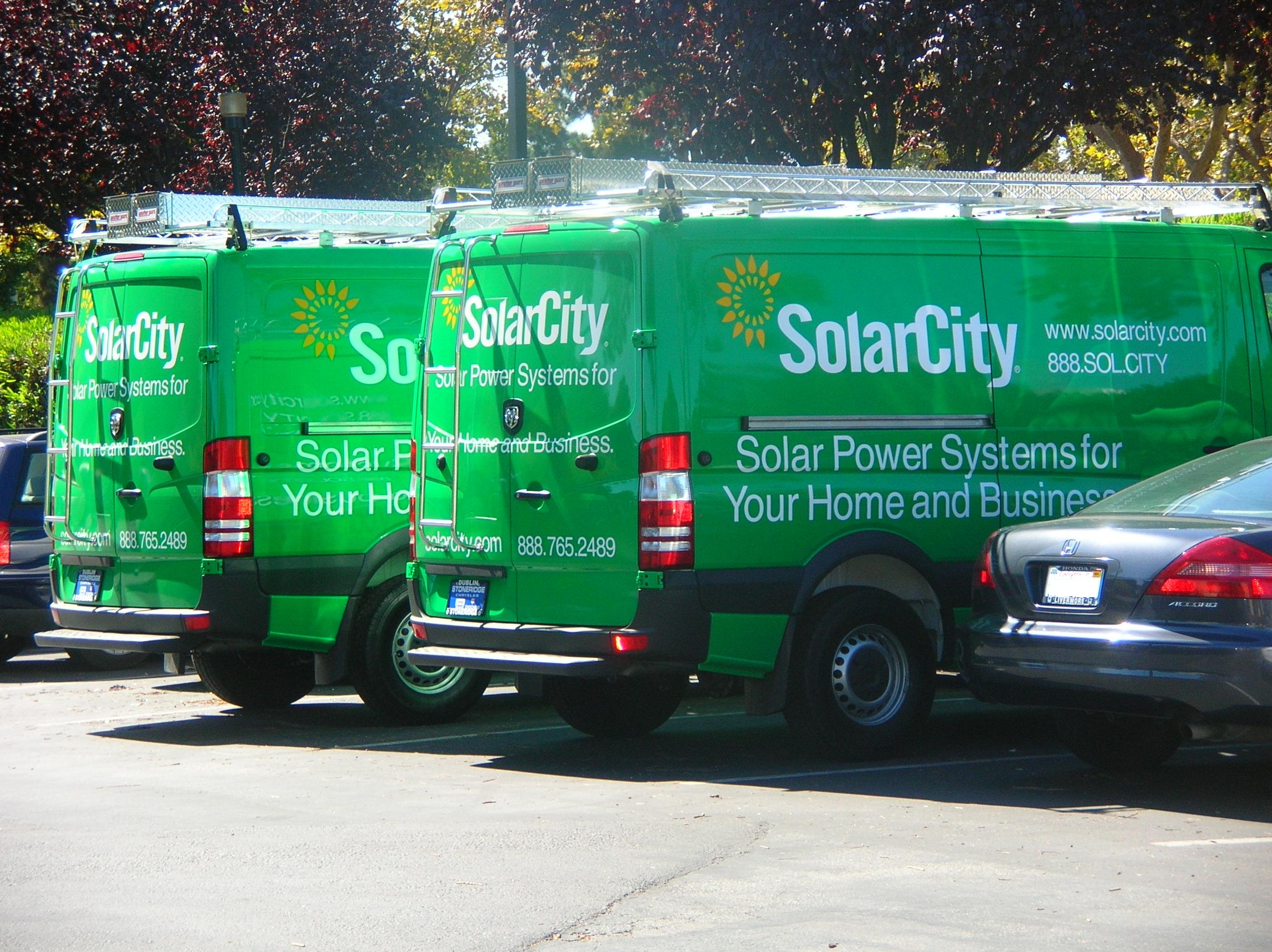
SolarCity solar-panel installation vans in 2009

Musk provided the initial concept and financial capital for SolarCity, which his cousins Lyndon and Peter Rive founded in 2006. By 2013, SolarCity was the second largest provider of solar power systems in the United States. In 2014, Musk promoted the idea of SolarCity building an advanced production facility in Buffalo, New York, triple the size of the largest solar plant in the United States. Construction of the factory started in 2014 and was completed in 2017. It operated as a joint venture with Panasonic until early 2020.

Tesla acquired SolarCity for $2 billion in 2016 and merged it with its battery unit to create Tesla Energy. The deal's announcement resulted in a more than 10% drop in Tesla's stock price; at the time, SolarCity was facing liquidity issues. Multiple shareholder groups filed a lawsuit against Musk and Tesla's directors, stating that the purchase of SolarCity was done solely to benefit Musk and came at the expense of Tesla and its shareholders. Tesla directors settled the lawsuit in January 2020, leaving Musk the sole remaining defendant. Two years later, the court ruled in Musk's favor.

== Neuralink ==
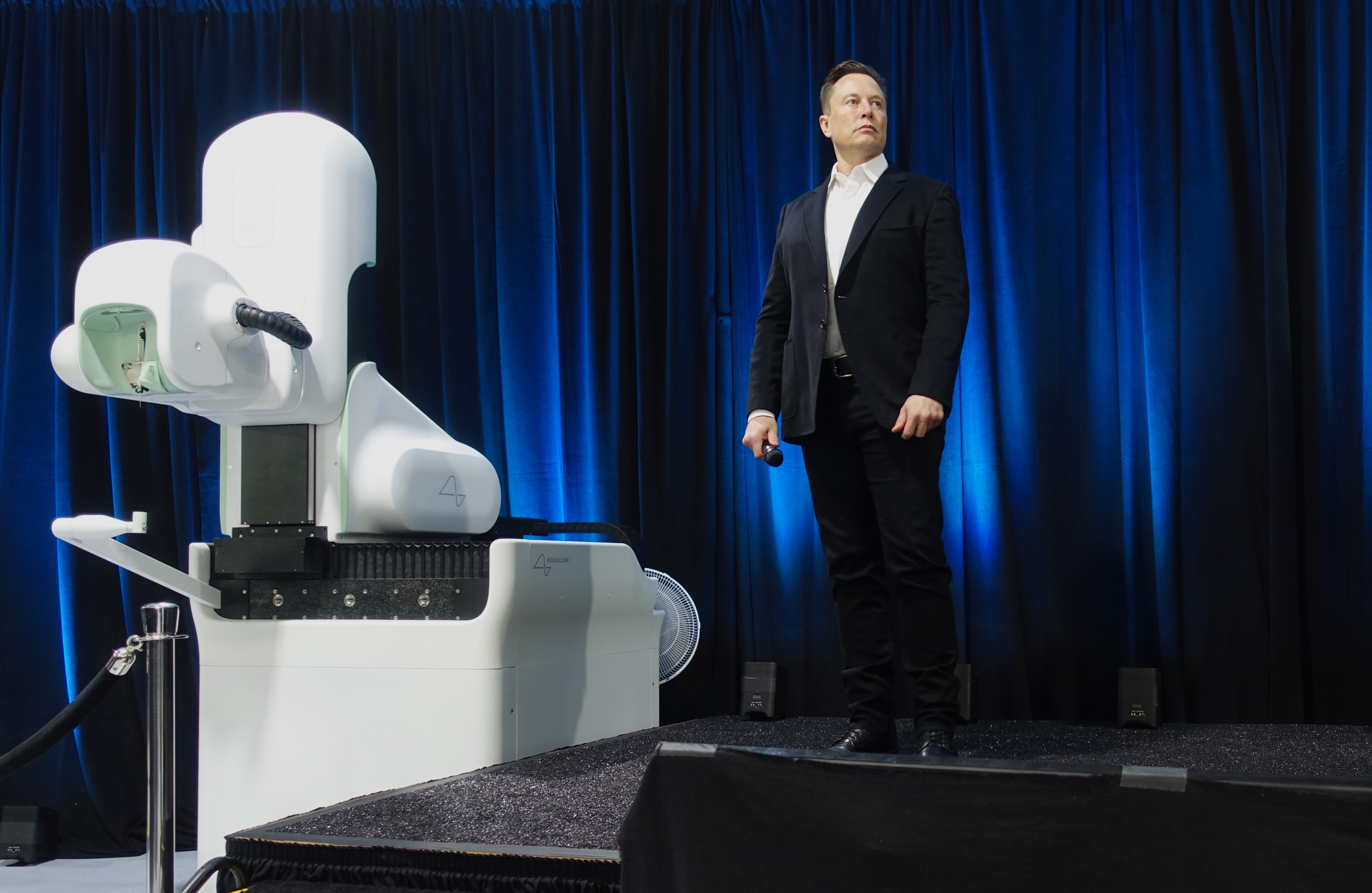
Musk discussing a Neuralink device during a live demonstration in 2020

In 2016, Musk co-founded Neuralink, a neurotechnology startup company, with an investment of $100 million. Neuralink aims to integrate the human brain with artificial intelligence (AI) by creating devices that are embedded in the brain. Such technology could enhance memory or allow the devices to communicate with software. The company also hopes to develop devices with which to treat neurological conditions such as Alzheimer's disease, dementia, and spinal cord injuries.

In 2019, Musk announced work on a device akin to a sewing machine that could embed threads into a human brain. In an October 2019 paper that detailed some of Neuralink's research, Musk was listed as the sole author, which rankled Neuralink researchers. At a 2020 live demonstration, Musk described one of their early devices as "a Fitbit in your skull" that could soon cure paralysis, deafness, blindness, and other disabilities. Many neuroscientists and publications criticized these claims, with MIT Technology Review describing them as "highly speculative" and "neuroscience theater". During the demonstration, Musk revealed a pig with a Neuralink implant that tracked neural activity related to smell. In 2022, Neuralink announced that clinical trials would begin by the end of the year.

Neuralink has conducted further animal testing on macaque monkeys at the University of California, Davis' Primate Research Center. In 2021, the company released a video in which a Macaque played the video game Pong via a Neuralink implant. The company's animal trials—which have caused the deaths of some monkeys—have led to claims of animal cruelty. The Physicians Committee for Responsible Medicine has alleged that Neuralink's animal trials have violated the Animal Welfare Act. Employees have complained that pressure from Musk to accelerate development has led to botched experiments and unnecessary animal deaths. In 2022, a federal probe was launched into possible animal welfare violations by Neuralink. In September 2023, the Food and Drug Administration approved Neuralink to initiate human trials, and it plans to conduct a six-year study.

== The Boring Company ==
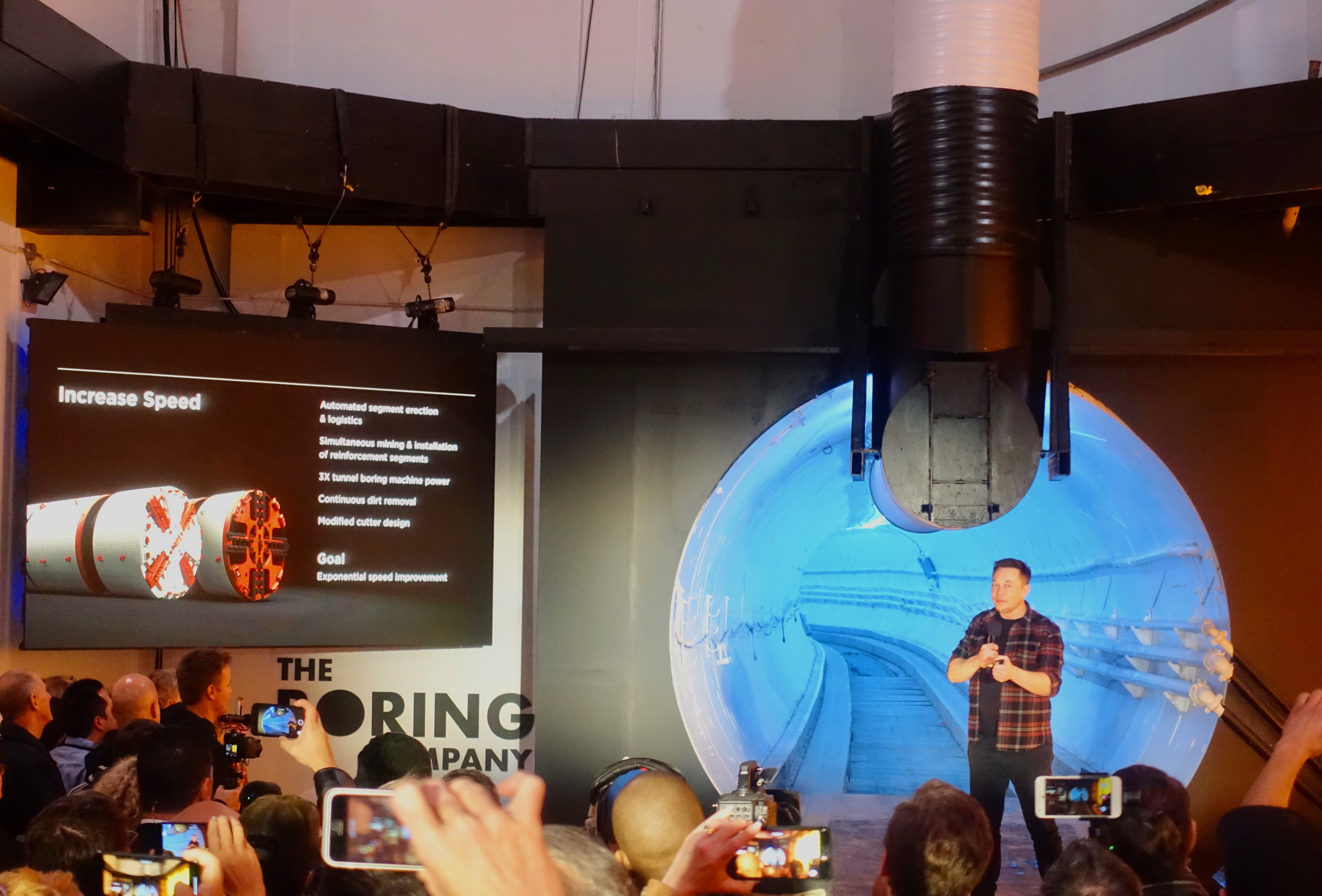
Musk during the 2018 inauguration of the Boring test tunnel in Hawthorne, California

In 2017, Musk founded the Boring Company to construct tunnels, and revealed plans for specialized, underground, high-occupancy vehicles that could travel up to 150 miles per hour (240 km/h) and thus circumvent above-ground traffic in major cities. Early in 2017, the company began discussions with regulatory bodies and initiated construction of a 30-foot (9.1 m) wide, 50-foot (15 m) long, and 15-foot (4.6 m) deep "test trench" on the premises of SpaceX's offices, as that required no permits. The Los Angeles tunnel, less than two miles (3.2 km) in length, debuted to journalists in 2018. It used Tesla Model Xs and was reported to be a rough ride while traveling at suboptimal speeds.

Two tunnel projects announced in 2018, in Chicago and West Los Angeles, have been canceled. However, a tunnel beneath the Las Vegas Convention Center was completed in early 2021. Local officials have approved further expansions of the tunnel system.

== Twitter/X ==
Avatar of Elon Musk

Elon Musk
(@elonmusk)
tweeted:

I made an offer
https://sec.gov/Archives/edgar...

April 14, 2022

Musk expressed interest in buying Twitter as early as 2017, and had questioned the platform's commitment to freedom of speech. Additionally, his ex-wife Talulah Riley had urged him to buy Twitter to stop the "woke-ism". In January 2022, Musk started purchasing Twitter shares, reaching a 9.2% stake by April, making him the largest shareholder. (Note: He did not file the necessary SEC paperwork within 10 days of his stake passing 5%, a violation of US securities laws.) When this was publicly disclosed, Twitter shares experienced the largest intraday price surge since the company's 2013 initial public offering. On April 4, Musk agreed to a deal that would appoint him to Twitter's board of directors and prohibit him from acquiring more than 14.9% of the company. However, on April 13, Musk made a $43 billion offer to buy Twitter, launching a takeover bid to buy 100% of Twitter's stock at $54.20 per share. In response, Twitter's board adopted a "poison pill" shareholder rights plan to make it more expensive for any single investor to own more than 15% of the company without board approval. Nevertheless, by the end of the month Musk had successfully concluded his bid for approximately $44 billion. This included about $12.5 billion in loans against his Tesla stock and $21 billion in equity financing.

Tesla's stock market value sank by over $100 billion the next day in reaction to the deal. He subsequently tweeted to his 86 million followers criticism of Twitter executive Vijaya Gadde's policies, which led to some of them engaging in sexist and racist harassment against her. Exactly a month after announcing the takeover, Musk stated that the deal was "on hold" following a report that 5% of Twitter's daily active users were spam accounts. Although he initially affirmed his commitment to the acquisition, he sent notification of his termination of the deal in July; Twitter's board of directors responded that they were committed to holding him to the transaction. On July 12, 2022, Twitter formally sued Musk in the Delaware Court of Chancery for breaching a legally binding agreement to purchase Twitter. In October 2022, Musk reversed again, offering to purchase Twitter at $54.20 per share. The acquisition was officially completed on October 27.

Immediately after the acquisition, Musk fired several top Twitter executives including CEO Parag Agrawal; Musk became the CEO instead. He instituted a $7.99 monthly subscription for a "blue check", and laid off a significant portion of the company's staff. Musk lessened content moderation, including reinstating accounts like The Babylon Bee. The Southern Poverty Law Center (SPLC) noted that Twitter has verified numerous extremists; hate speech also increased on the platform after his takeover.

In December 2022, Musk released internal documents relating to Twitter's moderation of Hunter Biden's laptop controversy in the lead-up to the 2020 presidential election. Comments on these internal documents by journalists Matt Taibbi, Bari Weiss, Michael Shellenberger and others were posted on Twitter as the Twitter Files. Musk and many Republicans alleged the documents showed that the Federal Bureau of Investigation (FBI) had engaged in government censorship by ordering Twitter to suppress a New York Post story about the laptop. Upon review of the documents, Taibbi said he had found no evidence to support the allegation, and Twitter attorneys denied the allegation in a subsequent court filing. The United States House Committee on the Judiciary held hearings on the Twitter Files on March 9, 2023, at which Taibbi and Shellenberger gave testimony.

In late 2022, Musk promised to step down as CEO after a Twitter poll posted by Musk found that a majority of users wanted him to do so. Five months later, Musk stepped down from chief executive officer (CEO) and placed former NBCUniversal executive Linda Yaccarino in the position and transitioned his role to executive chairman and chief technology officer (CTO).

On November 20, 2023, in a U.S. District Court in Texas, X filed a lawsuit stating that Media Matters for America "manipulated" the X platform, in that it used accounts that followed major brands, and "resorted to endlessly scrolling and refreshing" the feed until it found ads next to extremist posts.

The Wall Street Journal reported in August 2024 that the $13 billion Musk borrowed to buy Twitter was considered the worst deal in merger finance that banks have participated in since the 2008 financial crisis, adding that "the allure of banking Elon Musk, providing capital for him to buy a company, not only would reward them handsomely if things went according to plan" but "you can certainly say things have not gone according to plan". The Washington Post reported in September 2024 that the company had lost $24 billion in equity value, "a vaporization of wealth that has little parallel outside the realm of economic or industry-specific crashes, or devastating corporate scandals". Two years after the acquisition, Fidelity Investments estimated the value of its stake in X that implied the company had lost 79% of its value.

The Journal reported in January 2025 that Musk's lead banks hoped to soon begin selling down to other banks the $13 billion they had lent him, at 90 to 95 cents on the dollar. Lead banks typically sell down their exposure immediately after a deal closes, but they had been unable to sell the debt since the Twitter deal closed in October 2022. The paper published a Musk quote from an email he reportedly sent to X employees that month, saying "user growth is stagnant, revenue is unimpressive, and we're barely breaking even," though Musk denied sending the email hours after the article was published online.

== Leadership style ==
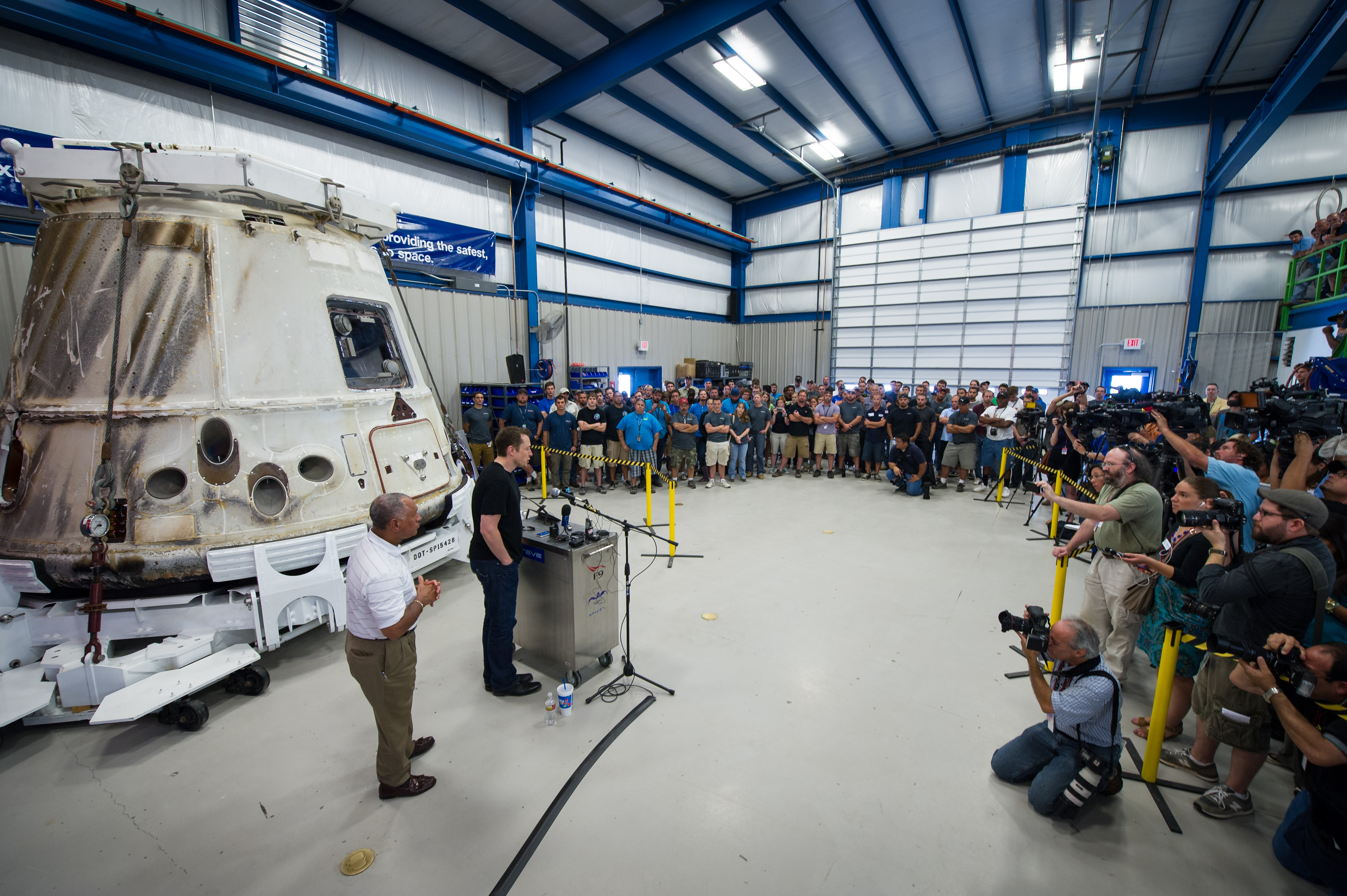
Musk giving a speech to SpaceX employees in 2012

Musk is often described as a micromanager and has called himself a "nano-manager". The New York Times has characterized his approach as autocratic. Musk does not make formal business plans. He has forced employees to adopt the company's own jargon and launched ambitious, risky, and costly projects against his advisors' recommendations, such as removing front-facing radar from Tesla Autopilot. His insistence on vertical integration causes his companies to move most production in-house. While this resulted in saved costs for SpaceX's rocket, vertical integration (as of 2018) has caused many usability problems for Tesla's internal corporate software.

Musk's handling of employees—whom he communicates with directly through mass emails—has been characterized as "carrot and stick", rewarding those "who offer constructive criticism" while also being known to impulsively threaten, swear at, and fire his employees. Musk said he expects his employees to work for long hours, sometimes 80 hours per week. He has his new employees sign strict non-disclosure agreements and often fires in sprees, such as during the Model 3 "production hell" in 2018. In 2022, Musk revealed plans to fire 10 percent of Tesla's workforce, due to his concerns about the economy. That same month, he suspended remote work at SpaceX and Tesla and threatened to fire employees who do not work 40 hours per week in the office. He laid off more than 10 percent of the Tesla workforce in early 2024.

Musk's leadership has been praised by some, who credit it with the success of Tesla and his other endeavors, and criticized by others, who see him as callous and his managerial decisions as "show[ing] a lack of human understanding". (Note: callous...: Bilton, Nick (November 10, 2020). "Elon Musk's Totally Awful, Batshit-Crazy, Completely Bonkers, Most Excellent Year". Vanity Fair. Archived from the original on January 29, 2021.; Vance (2017), p. 340. "Elon's worst trait by far, in my opinion, is a complete lack of loyalty or human connection. Many of us worked tirelessly for him for years and were tossed to the curb like a piece of litter without a second thought. Maybe it was calculated to keep the rest of the workforce on their toes and scared; maybe he was just able to detach from human connection to a remarkable degree. What was clear is that people who worked for him were like ammunition: used for a specific purpose until exhausted and discarded."; Wong, Julia Carrie (June 13, 2018). "Tesla workers say they pay the price for Elon Musk's big promises". The Guardian. Archived from the original on March 23, 2021. "The CEO is known for outsized claims and ambitious goals. But numerous factory workers say he doesn't follow through – and that his leadership sets a troubling tone."; Warzel, Charlie (November 7, 2022). "Elon Musk Is Bad at This" Archived December 31, 2022, at the Wayback Machine. The Atlantic.) The 2021 book Power Play: Tesla, Elon Musk, and the Bet of the Century contains anecdotes of Musk berating employees. The Wall Street Journal reported that, after Musk insisted on branding his vehicles as "self-driving", he faced criticism from his engineers for putting customer "lives at risk", with some employees resigning in 2017 in consequence.

== Sources ==
- Berger, Eric (2021). Liftoff. William Morrow and Company. ISBN 978-0-06-297997-1.
- Jackson, Eric M. (2004). The PayPal Wars: Battles with eBay, the Media, the Mafia, and the Rest of Planet Earth. Los Angeles, California: World Ahead Publishing. ISBN 978-0-9746701-0-2.
- Kidder, David; Hoffman, Reid (2013). The Startup Playbook: Secrets of the Fastest Growing Start-Ups from the founding Entrepreneurs. San Francisco, California: Chronicle Books. ISBN 978-1-4521-0504-8.
- Vance, Ashlee (2017) [2015]. Elon Musk: Tesla, SpaceX, and the Quest for a Fantastic Future (2nd ed.). New York: Ecco. ISBN 978-0-06-230125-3.
