= Timeline of PayPal =

This is a timeline of online money transfer and e-commerce service PayPal, owned by eBay from 2002 to 2015 and an independent company before and after that.

== Overview ==
Time period	Key developments at PayPal
January 1999 – March 2000	The two companies, Confinity and X.com, that will eventually merge to become PayPal, launch separately and build competing financial products. The first iteration of the PayPal product is released by Confinity in later 1999.
March 2000 – July 2002	Confinity and X.com merge. The combined entity, initially called X.com, later changes its name to PayPal. PayPal adopts eBay as a key platform to grow its userbase, because of the need for an online payment system on eBay. eBay responds with its own payment service, Billpoint. PayPal competes fiercely with Billpoint, raises a large amount of money, and IPOs in February 2002.
October 2002 – mid-2010	PayPal is acquired by eBay for $1.5 billion in eBay stock. The product and userbase grow steadily, faster than the parent company eBay.
mid-2010 – September 2014	PayPal moves aggressively into new territory, including micropayments, mobile payments, in-store payments, international expansion, and more tools for small and medium businesses. It debuts new hardware and collaborates with brick and mortar stores for its in-store payments options. It acquires competitor startup Braintree, a payments gateway company.
September 2014	It is announced that PayPal will be split off eBay.
July 2015 onward	The spinoff from eBay is completed on July 20, 2015, with the company trading independently under the ticker "PYPL" on the NASDAQ.

== Full timeline ==
Year	Month and date	Event type	Event
1998	December	Company launch	Confinity, the company that would later launch the first version of PayPal, is founded by Max Levchin, Peter Thiel, Luke Nosek, Yu Pan, Ken Howery, and Russel Simmons. The company idea is due to Max Levchin, and Thiel is initially interested only in being an investor, but Levchin convinces Thiel to become CEO of the company.
1999	January	Company launch	X.com, the company that would later merge with Confinity to become PayPal, is launched by Elon Musk.
1999	July	Product launch	Confinity announces the launch of online payment service PayPal, intended to be usable via a web browser and via a Palm Pilot. At the launch party in July, Nokia Ventures uses PayPal to send $3 million in venture capital investment on-stage.
1999	September	Product launch	The product is launched to the public.
1999	November	Product launch	Confinity launches a fully functional PayPal website and the staff send emails to their friends offering $1 for signing up.
1999	December	Product launch	Financial services company X.com, headed by chairman Elon Musk and CEO Bill Harris, adds online payment to its online account service, and makes it their product focus.
1999–2000	December–February	Customer focus shift	Confinity identifies eBay as a promising area to acquire users, because of the high concentration of buyers and sellers and the absence of any standard payment system for them to use.
2000	March 1	Competition	EBay announces Billpoint, its in-house payment service, in collaboration with Wells Fargo. This could pose a serious threat to PayPal, because eBay auctions are a major source of user acquisition for it.
2000	February (discussions), March 2 (announcement)	Merger	Confinity and X.com merge, and the new entity is officially called X.com. Bill Harris remains CEO of the new entity, while Elon Musk remains chairman. The top tier at Confinity receive vice-presidential titles at the new company.
2000	April	Leadership change	Bill Harris is ousted from the CEO role. Musk takes over the role of CEO and Thiel becomes chairman. The reason for Harris' departure appears to be his inability to handle the scaling issues posed by PayPal's rapid growth, as well as his continued focus on unproductive approaches such as striking deals with small and unreliable startups.
2000	June	Product	PayPal introduces paid accounts for buyers and sellers that require verification and offer guarantees against fraud.
2000	October	Leadership change	Elon Musk steps down as CEO and Peter Thiel takes over as interim CEO. Musk continues to stay on the board of directors.
2000	October	Product	The company closes X.com's financial services in order to focus on the online payment system. The company also decisively switches away from the X.com brand, even though its official name continues to be X.com.
2000–2001	Mid-2000 through all of 2001	Product	Max Levchin spearheads efforts to reduce fraud. This would prove to be one of PayPal's decisive sources of advantage, as the costs of fraud had constrained its ability to offer affordable services. Innovations include one of the web's first commercial implementations of CAPTCHA (in the form of the Gausebeck-Levchin test) and a program called "Igor" that identified and froze online activity that appeared fraudulent.
2002	February 15	Company IPO	PayPal has its initial public offering. The offering is for 5.4 million shares at a share price of $13 (determined the previous evening by Salomon Smith Barney, their investment bank), for a total of $70 million. The valuation of the company is about $800 million. On the launch date, the price of the shares peaks to $22 and closes at $20.
2002	July 8	Company buyout	It is announced that eBay will acquire PayPal using an all-stock acquisition, for $1.5 billion.
2002	October	Company buyout	eBay's acquisition of PayPal is formally completed.
2008	January	Acquisitions by PayPal	PayPal acquires Fraud Sciences, a privately held Israeli start-up company with expertise in online risk tools, for $169 million, in order to enhance PayPal's proprietary fraud management systems.
2008	November	Acquisitions by PayPal	PayPal acquires Bill Me Later, an online payments company offering transactional credit at over 9000 online merchants in the US.
2009	August	Product	PayPal launches Student Accounts for teens, allowing parents to set up a student account, transfer money into it, and obtain a debit card for student use. The program provides tools to teach teens how to spend money wisely and take responsibility for their actions.
2009	November	Product	PayPal opens its platform, allowing other services to get access to its code and to use its infrastructure in order to enable peer-to-peer online transactions.
2010	July 28	Product	PayPal removes the electronic withdrawal option for users in India.
2010	October 26	Product	PayPal unveils micropayments for digital goods, with Facebook as its first customer.
2011	January 28	Financial/legal	The Reserve Bank of India restricts PayPal payments to merchants to amounts under $100.
2011	June 27	Userbase	PayPal reaches 100 million users.
2011	September 25	Userbase	PayPal announces that it is processing $315 million in payments per day.
2012	January 6	Product	PayPal announces that its first in-store brick and mortar integration will be with Home Depot.
2012	March 15	Product	PayPal unveils PayPal Here, its new global payment platform for small and medium-sized businesses, with a swipe-free option for customers, developed in collaboration with card.io.
2012	April 4	Product	PayPal rebrands its services for small businesses as PayPal Payments and debuts a number of online, offline, and mobile payment options.
2012	May 30	Product	PayPal InStore is released in the UK with barcodes, but no NFC.
2012	June 19–20	Product	PayPal launches a new, redesigned, sleeker site.
2012	December 13	Product	PayPal launches a "PayPal My Cash Card" that people can buy with cash (at pharmacies and supermarkets that make it available) and then use to make online purchases.
2013	September 9	Product	PayPal debuts its new hardware platform, Beacon, a Bluetooth LE enabled device that facilitates hands-free checkins and payments.
2013	September 26	Acquisitions by PayPal	PayPal acquires payments gateway company Braintree for US$800 million in cash.
2013	November 27	Product	PayPal launches support for prepaid gift cards, just in time for the 2013 holiday shopping season.
2014	March 8	Product	PayPal rolls out its new "Mobile First" website globally.
2014	May 15	Product	The Google Play Store adds PayPal as a payment option, despite it being a direct competitor to Google Wallet. However, PayPal can only be used to buy apps and digital content, not devices and accessories.
2014	June 12	Product, international expansion	PayPal launches PassPort, a service aimed at facilitating international sales by merchants.
2014	July 30	Product, international expansion	PayPal renames its "Bill Me Later" service as PayPal Credit and expands PayPal Credit as well as PayPal Working Capital internationally.
2014	September 23	Product	PayPal enables Bitcoin transactions for merchants selling digital goods, claiming that it would earn transaction revenue through referral fees. Bitcoin's price rises rapidly in response to the announcement.
2014	September 30	Company restructuring	It is announced that PayPal will be split off from eBay. Both companies would get new CEOs as part of the deal, with eBay Marketplaces President Devin Wenig taking over at eBay, and PayPal President Dan Schulman presiding at PayPal.
2015	January	Product	Paydiant & FIS launch Cashless Card Access
2015	March 2	Acquisitions by PayPal	PayPal acquires Paydiant, a Boston-based startup that makes mobile wallet technology that powers payment apps for businesses such as Subway, Harris Teeter, and Capital One, and more importantly MCX, a merchant exchange network developing a payment app called CurrentC.
2015	March 10	Acquisitions by PayPal, product, international expansion	PayPal acquired CyActive, a predictive malware detection startup based in Israel, and uses the acquisition to kickstart a security hub in Israel.
2015	June 3	Legal	An as-of-yet unimplemented update to PayPal's terms of service is leaked by GHacks onto the Internet, the terms indicating that customers must agree to accept robocalls from PayPal at numbers not provided to PayPal, which may be procured by PayPal using "alternate means." The leaked terms indicate a customer may accept the terms or close their account. PayPal later announced that the updated terms are intended to "honor customers’ requests to decline to receive auto-dialed or prerecorded calls," causing further confusion and attention from the press.
2015	July 1	Acquisitions by PayPal	PayPal agrees to buy Xoom, a San Francisco-based online money transfer technology and services company that went public in 2013, for $25 per share, or $890 million. Xoom's focus is on facilitating international money transfers.
2015	November 12	Financial ranking	In June 2016, it was announced that PayPal had joined the Fortune 500 for the first time.
2016	January	Userbase	Venmo processes US$1 billion in payments in that month
2016	February	Product	PayPal and Braintree launch PayPal Commerce
2016	February	Product	PayPal launches redesign of PayPal app
2017	February	Product	PayPal launched a Slack bot for peer-to-peer payments with the shortcode/PayPal and a user's Slack handle.
2017	July	Product	PayPal announced the Global Sellers Program in partnership with Webinterpret. The program's goal is to offer the online store sellers cross-border solutions to reach more international markets.
2024	September 17	Logo	PayPal redesigns the logo, making it simpler.
