= PayPal Mafia =

Group of former PayPal employees

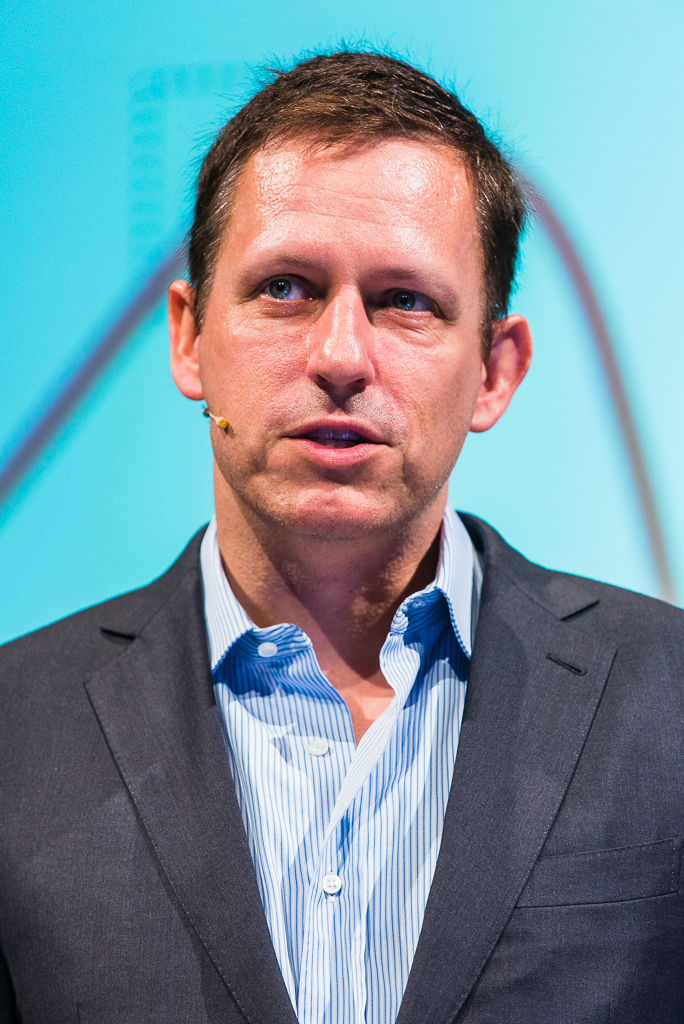
Venture capitalist Peter Thiel is referred to as the "don" of the PayPal Mafia.

The PayPal Mafia is a group of former PayPal employees and founders who have since founded and/or developed other technology companies based in Silicon Valley, such as LinkedIn, Palantir Technologies, SpaceX, Affirm, Slide, Kiva, YouTube, Yelp, and Yammer. Most of the members attended Stanford University or the University of Illinois Urbana-Champaign.

== History ==
Originally, PayPal was a money-transfer service offered by a company called Confinity, which merged with X.com in 1999. X.com was renamed PayPal and purchased by eBay in 2002. PayPal's employees had difficulty adjusting to eBay's more traditional corporate culture, and within four years all but 12 of the first 50 employees had left. They remained connected as social and business acquaintances, and several of them worked together to form new companies and venture firms. This group of PayPal alumni became so prolific that the term PayPal Mafia was coined. The term gained even wider exposure when a 2007 Fortune magazine article featured the group, along with a now-iconic photograph of its members dressed in mafia-style attire, highlighting their influence in Silicon Valley and their role in founding or investing in major technology companies (this photo does not feature all members: according to Fortune, "Musk wanted to come, but he's in Chicago to receive an 'innovator of the year' award. Hurley and Chen bowed out after their Google handler objected to the gangster motif.").

== Members ==
People the media calls members of the PayPal Mafia include:

- Peter Thiel, PayPal founder and former CEO. Sometimes called the "don" of the PayPal Mafia, he is a founder of Palantir and chairs its board, a founder of Founders Fund, and the first outside investor in Facebook. In 2007, Fortune wrote, "Today they call upon one another when they need money or advice—and when they need both, they go to Thiel, who seems to be at the center of it all. Among his many investments, Thiel has money in Slide, Yelp, and LinkedIn."
- Elon Musk, co-founder of Zip2 and founder of X.com (which merged with Confinity to form PayPal), SpaceX, OpenAI, Neuralink, and The Boring Company. He bought a controlling share in Tesla Motors and purchased Twitter (rebranded as X). As of November 2026, he is the wealthiest person on Earth, with a net worth of $750 billion. In 2025, he was a senior advisor to President Donald Trump and head of the Department of Government Efficiency (DOGE).
- David O. Sacks, former PayPal COO who later founded Geni.com and Yammer. In December 2024, President Trump named Sacks the White House AI and crypto czar for the incoming administration.
- Max Levchin, founder and chief technology officer at PayPal, CEO of Affirm, and co-founder of Glow. He is sometimes referred to as the "consigliere" of the PayPal Mafia.
- Scott Banister, early advisor and board member at PayPal.
- Roelof Botha, former PayPal CFO who became a partner at the venture capital firm Sequoia Capital.
- Steve Chen, former PayPal engineer who co-founded YouTube.
- Nathan Gettings, former director of risk and R&D at PayPal who became co-founder and executive at Palantir, Affirm Holdings, and RoboteX.
- Reid Hoffman, former executive vice president who founded LinkedIn and was an early investor in Facebook and Aviary. He sits on the board of Microsoft. Hoffman has said he prefers "PayPal Network" to "PayPal Mafia".
- Ken Howery, former PayPal CFO who became a partner at Founders Fund and served as the US ambassador to Sweden during the first Trump administration and US ambassador to Denmark during the second Trump administration.
- Chad Hurley, former PayPal web designer who co-founded YouTube.
- Eric M. Jackson, who wrote the book The PayPal Wars, became chief executive officer of WND Books, and co-founded CapLinked.
- Jawed Karim, former PayPal engineer who co-founded YouTube. Founder of YVentures.
- Dave McClure, former PayPal marketing director who co-founded 500 Global and became a super angel investor for startup companies.
- Andrew McCormack, founding partner at Valar Ventures.
- Luke Nosek, PayPal co-founder and former vice president of marketing and strategy who became a partner at Founders Fund.
- Keith Rabois, former executive at PayPal who later worked at LinkedIn, Square, Khosla Ventures, and Founders Fund.
- Jack Selby, former vice president of corporate and international development at PayPal who co-founded Clarium Capital with Peter Thiel and is the founder of Copper Sky Capital (formerly invisionAZ Fund, later renamed AZ-VC), which initially focused on Arizona but expanded to nationwide investment outside the traditional hubs like San Francisco, Boston, and New York.
- Premal Shah, former product manager at PayPal who became the founding president of Kiva.org. Serves on the Change.org board.
- Russel Simmons, former PayPal engineer who co-founded Yelp.
- Jeremy Stoppelman, former vice president of technology at PayPal who co-founded Yelp.
- Yishan Wong, former engineering manager at PayPal who later worked at Facebook, became the CEO of Reddit, and founded Terraformation Inc.
- Yu Pan was one of the co-founders of PayPal and played a role in designing the company's user interface and user experience. He later became involved in YouTube and co-founded Kiwi Crate, Inc.

=== Associates ===
- Joe Lonsdale: Lonsdale is sometimes said to be a member of the PayPal Mafia, but BuzzFeed News wrote that he was "too junior to be considered a true member" (while at PayPal, he was still a Stanford student and working as an intern). Business Insider also wrote that Lonsdale is technically not a member. Lonsdale co-founded or founded many companies, including Palantir, 8VC, Epirus, Addepar, and OpenGov. He also founded the Cicero Institute.
- Sanjay Bhargava: Musk called Bhargava one of the unsung heroes of PayPal. He is sometimes listed as a PayPal Mafia member. Bhargava invented the random deposit method, which is important in modern banking security. Later he served as country director for Starlink India.

Female executives have also had important roles at PayPal, and while some of them say the internal environment was meritocratic and they did not felt held back, they are not considered members of the PayPal Mafia (but are considered members of the broader network the "PayPalians"). Musk has cited Amy Roe Clement (VP of products at PayPal, later managing partner at Imaginable Futures), Julie Anderson (vice president for public relations and communications) and Sandy Blau among PayPal's unsung heroes. The female executives interviewed by Business Insider all said they did not believe the PayPal Mafia intentionally excluded women, but some noted that PayPal stories often fail to mention women. Some cited unconscious bias as a factor, while others (like Nellie Levchin, who formerly worked in financial-system product management at PayPal and later was an investor at SciFi VC, and is Max Levchin's wife) noted that the bias makes it hard for female leaders to raise early funding. Other notable female executives include:

- Rebecca Eisenberg, former senior counsel at PayPal, later founder and principal of Private Client Legal Services. She is one of the few women sometimes cited as members of PayPal Mafia.
- Deb Liu, former director of product, corporate strategy, social commerce, and charity at PayPal, later CEO of Ancestry.com.
- Huey Lin (Huey Ru Lin), formerly worked in product management and operations leadership at PayPal, later moved to Facebook and worked alongside Levchin as Affirm's COO, then became a VC at GGV Capital. She has also held leading roles at Flexport, Nium, and Hang Seng Bank.

== Legacy ==
The PayPal Mafia is sometimes credited with inspiring the reemergence of consumer-focused Internet companies after the dot-com bust of 2001. The PayPal Mafia phenomenon has been compared to the founding of Intel in the late 1960s by engineers who had earlier founded Fairchild Semiconductor after leaving Shockley Semiconductor. They are discussed in journalist Sarah Lacy's book Once You're Lucky, Twice You're Good. According to Lacy, the selection process and technical learning at PayPal played a role, but the main factor behind their success was the confidence they gained there. Their success has been attributed to their youth; the physical, cultural, and economic infrastructure of Silicon Valley; and the diversity of their skill sets. PayPal's founders encouraged tight social bonds among its employees, and many of them continued to trust and support one another after leaving PayPal. An intensely competitive environment and a shared struggle to keep the company solvent despite many setbacks also contributed to a strong and lasting camaraderie among former employees.

== Politics ==
Some members of the group, such as Thiel, Sacks, and Musk, later expressed libertarian and conservative political views. By contrast, Hoffman has been a top donor to many Democratic Party campaigns and political efforts.

After the 2024 United States presidential election, The Economist wrote that ⁣⁣the PayPal Mafia would "take over America's government" with Trump's reelection. Thiel protégé JD Vance is Trump's Vice President, Musk became head of the new Department of Government Efficiency (DOGE), and Sacks became Trump's advisor on AI and cryptocurrencies. Musk alone donated over $250 million to Trump's 2024 campaign.

== See also ==
- Pierre Omidyar
- Technolibertarianism
- Traitorous eight
- America PAC
