= List of companies founded by Stanford University alumni =

This is a list of companies founded by Stanford University alumni. This list is not exhaustive, as it only includes notable companies of which the founding and development history is well recorded by reliable sources. In particular, subsidiaries are listed with their owners in parentheses.

Stanford University is one of the most successful universities in creating companies, attracting funding, and licensing its inventions to existing companies. It is often held up as a model for technology transfer. Stanford's Office of Technology Licensing is responsible for commercializing developments. The university is described as having a strong venture culture in which students are encouraged, and often funded, to launch their own companies.

According to PitchBook, from 2006 to 2017, Stanford produced 1,127 company founders as alumni or current students, more than any other university in the world; and these founders created 957 companies, second only to UC Berkeley in the world. In addition, according to a Stanford alumni survey conducted in 2011, some 39,900 companies founded by Stanford alumni were active, and companies founded by Stanford alumni altogether generated more than $2.7 trillion in annual revenue and had created 5.4 million jobs, roughly equivalent to the 10th-largest economy in the world (2011).

In this list, founders of a company which merged with other companies to form a new company are counted as founders of the new company. However, founders of a company which later dissolved into several successor companies are not counted as founders of those successor companies; this same rule applies to spin-off companies. Finally, a defunct company is a company that stopped functioning completely (e.g., bankrupt) without dissolving, merging or being acquired.

== Top companies by revenues ==
=== Fortune Global 500 (2017) ===
This list shows companies in Fortune Global 500 founded or co-founded by Stanford alumni. The cut-off revenue for 2017 Fortune Global 500 companies was $21,609M in 2016.

	Company	Region	Fortune Global 500 (2017)	Revenue in US$ millions (2016)	Type	Category	Year founded	Comments
1	Alphabet Inc.	United States	65	90,272	Public	Conglomerate	2015	(Note: Alphabet Inc. was created through a corporate restructuring of Google, Inc in 2015. Google, Inc. itself was founded in 1998. Google currently is an LLC subsidiary company of Alphabet.)
2	Cisco Systems, Inc.	United States	187	49,247	Public	Hardware	1984	
3	HP Inc.	United States	194	48,238	Public	Technology	1939	
4	Nike	United States	331	32,376	Public	Athletic equipment	1964	
5	TSMC	Taiwan	369	29,388	Public	Semiconductor	1987	
6	Capital One	United States	395	27,519	Public	Finance	1988	

=== Fortune 1000 (2017) ===
This list shows companies in Fortune 1000 (only for companies within the U.S.) founded or co-founded by Stanford alumni. The cut-off revenue for 2017 Fortune 1000 companies was $1,791M in 2016.

	Company	Fortune 1000 (2017)	Revenue in millions (2016)	Type	Category	Year founded	Comments
1	Alphabet Inc.	27	90,272	Public	Conglomerate	2015	
2	HP Inc.	61	48,238	Public	Technology	1939	
3	Cisco Systems, Inc.	60	49,247	Public	Hardware	1984	
4	Nike	88	32,376	Public	Athletic equipment	1964	
5	Capital One	100	27,519	Public	Finance	1988	
6	Gap Inc.	178	15,516	Public	Clothing/accessories	1969	
–	Trader Joe's*	208	13,300	Private	Grocery	1958	^{†} Equivalently
7	Micron Technology	226	12,399	Public	Semiconductor	1978	
8	PayPal**	264	10,842	Public	Financial services	1998 (Confinity) 1999 (X.com)	
9	Netflix	314	8,831	Public	Entertainment	1997	
10	Expedia	317	8,774	Public	Travel	1996	
11	Charles Schwab Corporation	357	7,644	Public	Finance	1971	
12	Nvidia	387	6,910	Public	Technology	1993	
13	NetApp	468	5,546	Public	Technology	1992	
14	Yahoo!***	498	5,169	Acquired	Technology	1994	
15	Intuit	527	4,831	Public	Software	1983	
16	Electronic Arts	556	4,396	Public	Video game	1982	
17	Akamai Technologies	851	2,340	Public	Internet/technology	1998	
–	Bain & Company****	864	2,300	Partnership	Consulting	1973	^{†} Equivalently
18	Cypress Semiconductor	959	1,923	Public	Semiconductor	1982	

*: _{Trader Joe's does not reveal its annual revenue. Its revenue is estimated by Supermarket News.}

**: _{Merger of different companies, at least one of which was founded by Stanford alumni.}

***: _{Yahoo! was acquired by Verizon in 2017 and is no longer an independent company.} _{However, it is still listed in Fortune 1000 by Fortune for 2017.}

_{****:} _{Bain & Company are not listed in Fortune 1000. Its revenue is provided by Forbes.}

=== Former Fortune-listed companies ===
For each company, only the latest rankings (up to three years) are shown in this list.

	Company	Fortune Global 500			Fortune 1000			Type	Category	Year founded
1	Google	162 (2014)	189 (2013)	277 (2012)	46 (2014)	55 (2013)	73 (2012)	Subsidiary	Technology	1998
2	Sun Microsystems	-	-	-	204 (2010)	187 (2009)	184 (2008)	Acquired	Technology	1982
3	Atari	-	-	-	400 (1989)	483 (1988)	-	Acquired	Video game	1972
4	Silicon Graphics	-	-	-	876 (2003)	738 (2002)	625 (2001)	Defunct	Technology	1981
5	LinkedIn	-	-	-	945 (2015)	-	-	Acquired	Social media	2002
6	Fairchild Semiconductor	-	-	-	984 (2008)	963 (2007)	886 (2005)	Acquired	Semiconductor	1957

== Timeline ==
=== Index ===
This index also contains companies listed in section "Notable defunct & dissolved".

Year	Companies founded					
1932	Draper Laboratory					
1939	HP Inc. (Hewlett-Packard)					
1948	Varian Associates					
1957	Fairchild Semiconductor					
1958	Trader Joe's					
1964	Nike					
1965	Dolby Laboratories					
1969	Gap Inc.					
1971	Charles Schwab Corporation					
1972	Atari	Kleiner Perkins Caufield & Byers				
1973	Bain & Company					
1978	Micron Technology					
1981	Logitech	Silicon Graphics				
1982	Cypress Semiconductor	Electronic Arts	Sun Microsystems			
1983	Intuit	Lattice Semiconductor				
1984	Bain Capital	Cisco Systems, Inc.	Hellman & Friedman			
1986	Farallon Capital	Pixar				
1987	TSMC					
1988	Capital One	D. E. Shaw & Co.				
1990	iRobot					
1991	3DO	IDEO				
1992	NetApp					
1993	Nvidia					
1994	Cycorp	Yahoo!				
1995	WebEx					
1996	Alta Partners	Expedia	Extreme Networks			
1997	Netflix					
1998	Akamai Technologies	Confinity (PayPal)	Google	VMware		
1999	SparkNotes	Viking Global Investors	X.com (PayPal)			
2000	Pandora Radio	StubHub				
2001	OkCupid	Two Sigma				
2002	Clarium Capital	Coverity	LinkedIn	SpaceX		
2004	Palantir Technologies	Redfin	Trulia	Tesla, Inc.		
2005	Eye-Fi	Founders Fund	Loopt	TechCrunch	Workday, Inc.	YouTube
2006	Youku	Zillow				
2007	Bonobos	Glassdoor	Sunrun			
2008	Cloudera	Yammer				
2009	Ginkgo Bioworks	WhatsApp				
2010	Instagram	Obihai Technology				
2011	Gusto	Snapchat	Stitch Fix	Sapphire Ventures		
2012	Coursera	Omaze				
2013	Robinhood					
2015	Alphabet, Inc.	Draper James	OpenAI			
2016	The Boring Company					
2017	Brex					

=== Before 1960 ===
Company	Type	Stock	Category	Year founded	Total founders	Founder/co-founder from Stanford
Draper Laboratory	Non-profit		Defense & security	1932	1	1. Charles Stark Draper (B.A)
Fairchild Semiconductor	(NASDAQ: ON)		Semiconductor	1957	8	1. Co-founder Victor Grinich (PhD)
HP Inc./Hewlett-Packard	Public	NYSE: HPQ	Technology	1939	2	1. William R. Hewlett (B.A, PhD); 2. David Packard (B.A, M.S)
Trader Joe's	Private		Grocery	1958	1	1. Joe Coulombe (M.B.A)

=== 1960–1979 ===
Company	Type	Stock	Category	Year founded	Total founders	Founder/co-founder from Stanford
Atari	(EPA: ATA)		Video game	1972	2	1. Nolan Bushnell (M.B.A Attendee)
Bain & Company	Partnership		Consulting	1973	Unknown	1. Co-founder Patrick F. Graham (M.B.A)
Charles Schwab Corporation	Public	NYSE: SCHW	Finance	1971	1	1. Charles R. Schwab (B.A, M.B.A)
Dolby Laboratories	Public	NYSE: DLB	Audio electronics	1965	1	1. Ray Dolby (B.S.E.E.)
Gap Inc.	Public	NYSE: GPS	Clothing/accessories	1969	2	1. Co-founder Doris F. Fisher (B.A)
Kleiner Perkins Caufield & Byers	Private		Finance	1972	4	1. Co-founder Brook Byers (M.B.A)
Micron Technology	Public	NASDAQ: MU	Semiconductor	1978	4	1. Co-founder Ward Parkinson (M.S)
Nike	Public	NYSE: NKE	Athletic equipment	1964	2	1. Co-founder Phil Knight (M.B.A)

=== 1980–1999 ===
Company	Type	Stock	Category	Year founded	Total founders	Founder/co-founder from Stanford
Akamai Technologies	Public	NASDAQ: AKAM	Internet/technology	1998	4	1. Co-founder Jonathan Seelig (B.S)
Alta Partners	Private		Venture capital	1996	4	1. Co-founder Guy P. Nohra (B.S)
Bain Capital	Private		Investment management	1984	3	1. Co-founder Mitt Romney (undergraduate attendee); 2. Co-founder T. Coleman Andrews III (M.B.A)
Capital One	Public	NYSE: COF	Finance	1988	2	1. Co-founder Richard Fairbank (B.A, M.B.A)
Cisco Systems, Inc.	Public	NASDAQ: CSCO	Hardware	1984	2	1. Leonard Bosack (M.S); 2. Sandy Lerner (M.S)
Confinity & X.com (now PayPal)	Public (merged)	NASDAQ: PYPL	Financial services	1998 (Confinity) 1999 (X.com)	5	1. Co-founder Elon Musk (Graduate Attendee); 2. Co-founder Ken Howery (B.A); 3. Co-founder Peter Thiel (B.A, J.D)
Cycorp	Private		Artificial intelligence	1994	1	1. Doug Lenat (PhD)
Cypress Semiconductor	Public	NASDAQ: CY	Semiconductor	1982	1	1. T. J. Rodgers (M.A, PhD)
D. E. Shaw & Co.	Private		Finance	1988	1	1. David E. Shaw (PhD)
Electronic Arts	Public	NASDAQ: EA	Video game	1982	1	1. Trip Hawkins (M.B.A)
Expedia	Public	NASDAQ: EXPE	Travel	1996	1	1. Rich Barton (B.S)
Extreme Networks	Public	NASDAQ: EXTR	Networking/technology	1996	3	1. Co-founder Stephen Haddock (B.S, M.S)
Farallon Capital	Private		Investment management	1986	1	1. Tom Steyer (M.B.A)
Google	(NASDAQ: GOOGL)		Technology	1998	2	1. Larry Page (M.S); 2. Sergey Brin (M.S)
Hellman & Friedman	Private		Private equity	1984	2	1. Co-founder Tully Friedman (B.A)
IDEO	Private		Design	1991	3	1. Co-founder David Kelley (M.S)
Immersion	Public	NASDAQ: IMMR	Virtual reality / haptics	1993		1. Founder Louis B. Rosenberg (B.S, M.S, Ph.D)
Intuit	Public	NASDAQ: INTU	Software	1983	2	1. Co-founder Tom Proulx (B.S)
iRobot	Public	NASDAQ: IRBT	Technology	1990	3	1. Co-founder Rodney Brooks (PhD)
Lattice Semiconductor	Public	NASDAQ: LSCC	Semiconductor	1983	3	1. Co-founder Rahul Sud (PhD)
Logitech	Public	NASDAQ: LOGI	Technology	1981	3	1. Co-founder Daniel Borel (M.S); 2. Co-founder Pierluigi Zappacosta (M.S)
NetApp	Public	NASDAQ: NTAP	Technology	1992	2	1. Co-founder James K. Lau (M.S)
Netflix	Public	NASDAQ: NFLX	Entertainment	1997	2	1. Co-founder Reed Hastings (M.S)
Nvidia	Public	NASDAQ: NVDA	Technology	1993	3	1. Co-founder Jensen Huang (M.S)
Pixar	(NYSE: DIS)		Computer animation	1986	2	1. Co-founder Alvy Ray Smith (PhD)
SparkNotes	(NYSE: BKS)		Publisher	1999	4	1. Co-founder Sam Yagan (M.B.A)
Spectrum Astro	Private		Space	1988		1. W. David Thompson
Sun Microsystems	(NYSE: ORCL)		Technology	1982	4	1. Co-founder Andy Bechtolsheim (PhD); 2. Co-founder Scott McNealy (M.B.A); 3. Co-founder Vinod Khosla (M.B.A)
TSMC	Public	NYSE: TSM	Semiconductor	1987	1	1. Morris Chang (PhD)
Viking Global Investors	Private		Hedge fund	1999	1	1. Ole Andreas Halvorsen (M.B.A)
VMware	Public	NYSE: VMW	Technology	1998	5	1. Co-founder Scott Devine (M.S, PhD); 2. Co-founder Edouard Bugnion (M.S, PhD)
WebEx	(NASDAQ: CSCO)		Telecom	1995	2	1. Co-founder Min Zhu (M.S)
Yahoo!	(NYSE: VZ)		Web service	1994	2	1. Jerry Yang (B.S, M.S); 2. David Filo (M.S)

=== 2000–present ===
Company	Type	Stock	Category	Year founded	Total founders	Founder/co-founder from Stanford
Alphabet, Inc.	Public	NASDAQ: GOOGL	Conglomerate	2015	2	1. Larry Page (M.S); 2. Sergey Brin (M.S)
Bonobos	(NYSE: WMT)		Apparel retail	2007	2	1. Andy Dunn (M.B.A); 2. Brian Spaly (M.B.A)
Clarium Capital	Private		Finance	2002	2	1. Co-founder Peter Thiel (B.A, J.D)
Cloudera	Public	NYSE: CLDR	Software	2008	4	1. Co-founder Amr Awadallah (PhD)
Coursera	Public	NYSE: COUR	Technology/education	2012	2	1. Co-founder Daphne Koller (PhD)
Coverity	(NASDQ: SNPS)		Security/technology	2002	3	1. Co-founder Andy Chou (PhD); 2. Co-founder Seth Hallem (B.S)
Draper James	Private		Clothing	2015	1	1. Reese Witherspoon (undergraduate attendee)
Eye-Fi	Private		Computer hardware	2005	4	1. Co-founder Yuval Koren (M.S)
Founders Fund	Private		Finance	2005	3	1. Co-founder Peter Thiel (B.A, J.D)
Freelancer	(ASX:FLN)		Crowdsourcing	2009	1	1. Matt Barrie (M.S.)
Ginkgo Bioworks	Private		Biotechnology	2009	5	1. Co-founder Austin Che (B.S)
Glassdoor	Private		Online review	2007	3	1. Co-founder Robert Hohman (M.S); 2. Co-founder Rich Barton (B.S)
Instagram	(NASDAQ: FB)		Social media	2010	2	1. Kevin Systrom (B.S); 2. Mike Krieger (B.S, M.S)
LinkedIn	(NASDAQ: MSFT)		Social media	2002	5	1. Co-founder Reid Hoffman (B.S); 2. Co-founder Allen Blue (B.A); 3. Co-founder Eric Ly (B.S); 4. Co-founder Konstantin Guericke (B.S, M.S)
Loopt	Private		Mobile services	2005	3	1. Sam Altman (undergraduate attendee); 2. Nick Sivo (on-leave); 3. Alok Deshpande (undergraduate attendee)
Palantir Technologies	Private		Technology	2004	5	1. Co-founder Peter Thiel (B.A, J.D); 2. Co-founder Alexander C. Karp (J.D); 3. Co-founder Joe Lonsdale (B.S); 4. Co-founder Stephen Cohen (B.S)
Obihai Technology	(NASDAQ: PLCM)		Communication	2010	2	1. Co-founder Jan Fandrianto (M.S)
OkCupid	(NASDAQ: IAC)		Dating service	2001	4	1. Co-founder Sam Yagan (M.B.A)
Omaze	Private		Fundraising	2012	2	1. Ryan Cummins (B.A); 2. Matt Pohlson (B.A)
OpenAI	Non-profit		Technology	2015	2	1. Elon Musk (Graduate Attendee); 2. Sam Altman (undergraduate attendee)
Pandora Radio	Public	NYSE: P	Music streaming	2000	3	1. Co-founder Jon Kraft (B.A); 2. Co-founder Tim Westergren (B.A)
Redfin	Public	NASDAQ: RDFN	Real estate	2004	3	1. Co-founder David Selinger (B.S)
Robinhood	Private		Financial services	2013	2	1. Baiju Prafulkumar Bhatt (B.S, M.S); 2. Vlad Tenev (B.S)
Sapphire Ventures	Private		Venture capital	2011	1	1. Nino Marakovic
Snapchat	Public	NYSE: SNAP	Social/technology	2011	3	1. Evan Spiegel (undergraduate attendee); 2. Bobby Murphy (B.S); 3. Reggie Brown (B.A)
SpaceX	Private		Aerospace/technology	2002	1	1. Elon Musk (Graduate Attendee)
Stitch Fix	Public	NASDAQ: SFIX	Retail/styling	2011	2	1. Katrina Lake (B.S); 2. Steve Anderson (M.B.A)
StubHub	(NASDAQ: EBAY)		Ticket exchange	2000	2	1. Jeff Fluhr (M.B.A Attendee); 2. Eric Baker (M.B.A)
Sunrun	Public	NASDAQ: RUN	Solar energy	2007	3	1. Co-founder Lynn Jurich (B.S, M.B.A); 2. Co-founder Edward Fenster (M.B.A)
TechCrunch	(Oath Inc.)		Online publisher	2005	1	1. Michael Arrington (J.D)
Tesla, Inc.	Public	NASDAQ: TSLA	Automotive	2004	5	1. Elon Musk (Graduate Attendee); 2. J. B. Straubel (B.S. ajd M.S.)
The Boring Company	Private		Technology	2016	1	1. Elon Musk (Graduate Attendee)
Trulia	(NASDAQ: Z)		Real estate database	2004	2	1. Pete Flint (M.B.A); 2. Sami Inkinen (M.B.A)
Two Sigma	Private		Finance	2001	3	1. Co-founder John Overdeck (B.S, M.S)
WhatsApp	(NASDAQ: FB)		Social media	2009	2|: 1. Co-founder Brian Acton (B.S)	
Workday, Inc.	Public	NASDAQ: WDAY	Software	2005	2	1. Co-founder Aneel Bhusri (M.B.A)
DeepVu	Private		Autonomous supply chains	2016	2	1. Co-founder Moataz Rashad (M.S.)
Yammer	Private		Social networking	2008	3	1. Co-founder David O. Sacks (B.A)
Youku —> Youku Tudou	—> (NYSE: BABA) (merged)		Online video	2006 (Youku)	1 (Youku)	1. Victor Koo (M.B.A)
YouTube	(NASDAQ: GOOGL)		Video hosting services	2005	3	1. Co-founder Jawed Karim (M.S)
Zillow	Public	NASDAQ: Z	Real estate database	2006	2	1. Rich Barton (B.S); 2. Lloyd Frink (B.A)
MX Player	Private		Online video	2017	2	1. Karan Bedi (B.A); 2. Satyan Gajwani (B.S)

== Defunct ==
Company	Type	Category	Year founded	Total founders	Founder/co-founder from Stanford
3DO	Bankrupt	Video game	1991	1	Trip Hawkins (MBA)
Silicon Graphics	Bankrupt	Technology	1981	Unknown	Kurt Akeley (MS, PhD); et al
Theranos	Defunct	Technology	2003	1	Elizabeth Holmes (dropped out)
Varian Associates	Defunct	Technology	1948	4	Russell Varian (BS, MS); W. W. Hansen (BA, PhD); Edward Ginzton (PhD)

== See also ==
- List of Stanford University faculty and staff
