= CapLinked =

Project management software

- Founded: 2010; 16 years ago
- Founder: Eric Jackson; Christopher Grey
- Headquarters: Manhattan Beach, California
- Key people: Eric Jackson; Christopher Grey
- Website: https://www.caplinked.com/

CapLinked is an online business transaction and project management application developed in the United States. The company's SaaS platform includes tools for document management, similar to a Virtual Data Room, messaging, updates, and business intelligence tools.

== Company history ==
CapLinked was founded in 2010 by Eric Jackson, former Vice President of Marketing at PayPal and author of The PayPal Wars, and Christopher Grey, founder of Crestridge Investors and former managing director at Emigrant Bank. The company's investors include PayPal co-founder Peter Thiel, Palantir Technologies co-founder Joe Lonsdale, 500 Startups partner Dave McClure, Sonos CFO Aman Verjee, and 7th Rig managing partner David Anderson. Since its launch, the company has been profiled in several publications, including Forbes, GigaOm, and the Wall Street Journal. The firm operates out of Manhattan Beach, California.

== Product overview ==
CapLinked provides a platform for various types of business deals such as capital raises, private placements, M&A, and investor reporting. Tools to help with these deals include online Workspaces for document storage and sharing, activity and audit tracking, and a messaging platform for Investor Relations and CRM. As of August 2012, over 100,000 members had managed over $20 Billion using the site.

== See also ==
- PayPal Mafia
- List of project management software
- List of collaborative software
