= TramwayPath =

Website for property prize competitions

- Website type: prize competitions
- Headquarters: London, UK
- Website: tramwaypath.co.uk
- Current status: Active

TramwayPath is a website that organizes property prize competitions. The website was established in 2020 by Daniel Twenefour, and held its first competition in May 2020.

== History ==
Twenefour started TramwayPath in May 2020 as a means to sell his property which was located in Tramway Path in Mitcham, South London through a legally binding prize competition for £2 a ticket, after trying to sell the property for around one year. Prize competitions held by TramwayPath include a no purchase necessary clause to avoid being classed as a lottery. After successfully giving away his property, Twenefour continued to run the prize competitions alongside his brothers, William and Jason Twenefour.

== See also ==
- Omaze
