= Luke Nosek =

Polish-born American entrepreneur; co-founder of PayPal

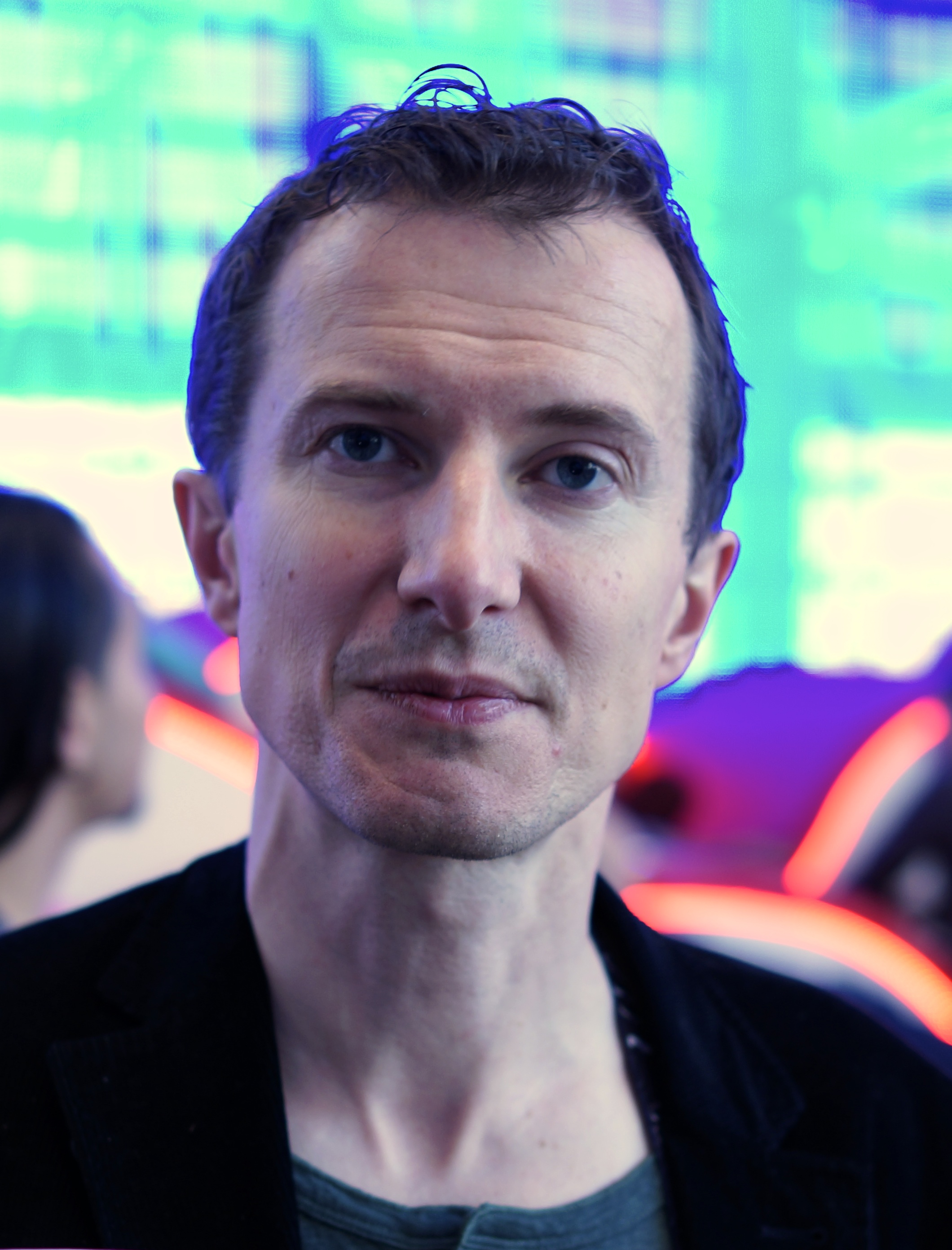
- Nosek in 2013
- Born: Łukasz Nosek; 1975 (age 50–51); Tarnów, Poland
- Education: University of Illinois at Urbana–Champaign (BS)
- Occupations: Venture capitalist, Entrepreneur
- Known for: Co-founder and VP of marketing at PayPal
- Board member of: SpaceX
- Website: Forbes profile

Łukasz Nosek (/ˈnoʊsɪk/; born 1975) is a Polish-American billionaire entrepreneur, notable for being a co-founder of PayPal, which he co-founded with Max Levchin, Peter Thiel, Yu Pan and Ken Howery as Confinity in 1998. He is also a co-founder of Founders Fund.

As of June 2026, Forbes estimates his net worth to be $2.7 billion, overwhelmingly attributable to his initial investment in SpaceX in 2008.

== Early life and education ==
Łukasz Nosek was born in Tarnów, Poland. After emigrating to the US, he earned a B.S. in Computer Engineering from the University of Illinois at Urbana–Champaign (UIUC) in 1996. During his time at UIUC, he met several student entrepreneurs from the school's Association for Computing Machinery chapter including Max Levchin, Scott Banister, and Russel Simmons that would become future colleagues.

== Career ==
=== University of Illinois at Urbana-Champaign (1995-1996) ===
In the summer of 1995, while still in college, he co-founded SponsorNet New Media, Inc., along with fellow Illinois students Max Levchin and Scott Banister, who would be future colleagues at PayPal. Following graduation, Nosek then worked for Netscape from 1997 to 1998 as an evangelist.

=== PayPal (1998-2002) ===
In 1998, with Max Levchin, Peter Thiel, Yu Pan, and Ken Howery, Nosek co-founded financial payments company Fieldlink, later renamed to Confinity before merging with X.com to create the PayPal service, where he was vice president of marketing and strategy, creating the company's "instant transfer" product.

In his first conversation with Thiel, he told Thiel he had just registered to be cryonically suspended, in other words, that he would be subject to low-temperature preservation after death in hopes that he might be revived by future medical technology. Thiel himself would later follow Nosek's example.

After PayPal went public and was sold to eBay for $1.5 billion in 2002, Nosek left the company to travel and pursue angel investing.

=== Founders Fund (2005-2017) ===
In 2005, with Thiel and Ken Howery, he started Founders Fund, a San Francisco-based venture capital firm with over $1 billion under management. Through Founders Fund, Nosek was the first institutional investor in Elon Musk's SpaceX, and sits on the company's board. Nosek left the firm in July 2017 to pursue other ventures.

=== Other Ventures ===
In July 2017, Stephen Oskoui, a venture partner at Founders Fund, and Nosek left the firm to launch Gigafund, an investment fund focused on space exploration.

He also sits on the board of ResearchGate. Nosek was also an early investor in DeepMind and is on its board of directors.
