= Jim Bruene =

American financial journalist

Jim Bruene is an American financial journalist.

== Early life and education ==
Bruene graduated the University of Washington with an MBA in Marketing and Finance and Iowa State University with a BS in Engineering.

== Career ==
In 1994, Bruene founded Financial Innovations and Digital Banking Report (that was called Online Banking Report when it was established in 1995). He set up Tracking fintech & financial services innovations. He is the organizer and writer for the Online Banking Report.

He is the founder of the Finovate conference series.

Bruene spent two years as a deposit and credit card product manager for First Interstate Bank between 1988 and 1990. He then became a Loan and Mortgage Product Manager for Security Pacific Bank until 1992. At that point he spent a further two years at US Bancorp in the area of online banking product development, specifically with Microsoft Money. He also worked for Caterpillar Inc., and in an advisory capacity for X.com/PayPal and ING Direct among others.

=== Finance industry ===
In 1994 Bruene founded Online Financial Innovations. Since then he has worked as its publisher, been the editor and is in charge of leading content of newsletters and reports on retail financial services (including: electronic billing, payments, e-messaging, statements, small business banking, online loan origins, etc.), working with financial institutions offering strategy advice for enhancing online services and Return on Investment (ROI).

=== Financial journals ===
Bruene has a presence in the world of financial journals. He is often quoted in American Banker, CNNfn, Forbes, Money Magazine, MSNBC, The New York Times, PC Week, SmartMoney, The Financial Times, The Wall Street Journal, and The Washington Post.

He has spoken at a variety of forums in the finance sector such as: ABA Annual Convention, BAI's Retail Delivery, and CBA Executive Convention.
