= X Corp. =

American technology company

- Type: Subsidiary
- Industry: Social media; Financial services
- Predecessor: Twitter, Inc.
- Founded: March 9, 2023; 3 years ago (Note: In an April 4, 2023, court filing, Twitter, Inc. disclosed that it no longer existed and was consolidated into X Corp. The corporation was created under Nevada corporate law on March 9, 2023.)
- Founder: Elon Musk
- Headquarters: Bastrop, Texas, United States
- Area served: Worldwide
- Key people: Elon Musk (chairman, CTO)
- Services: X
- Revenue: ▲US$2.7 billion (2024)
- Owner: SpaceX
- Number of employees: c. 1,500 (August 2023)
- Parent: SpaceX Super Intelligence
- Website: about.x.com

X Corp. (stylized as 𝕏) is an American technology company headquartered in Bastrop, Texas. Established by Elon Musk in 2023 as the successor to Twitter, Inc., it is a wholly owned subsidiary of SpaceX Super Intelligence (formerly xAI and SpaceXAI) since March 28, 2025, which is itself a subsidiary of SpaceX since February 2, 2026. The company owns the social networking service X, and has announced plans to use it as a base for other offerings, including the incorporation of xAI's Grok and Grok Imagine models. They also own the trademarks of Twitter, as well as defunct services Vine, Periscope, and X.com.

== History ==
=== Conceptualization and planning (2022–2023) ===
In April 2022, filings submitted to the Securities and Exchange Commission (SEC) revealed Musk had formed three corporate entities in Delaware, one was X Corp, another was X Holdings and another was X Holdings Corp. According to the filings, one of the entities was to merge with Twitter, Inc., while another was to serve as the parent company of the newly merged company. A third entity would then help take on a US$13 billion loan provided by various large banks to acquire Twitter.

The name "X" dates back to X.com, an online bank co-founded by Musk in 1999. In March 2000, X.com merged with competitor Confinity to create PayPal. Musk considered forming a holding company named "X" for Tesla, Inc. and SpaceX in August 2012. In July 2017, Musk reacquired the domain X.com, for an undisclosed amount, from PayPal. Musk reaffirmed his support for the name "X" in December 2020, replying to a Twitter user who renewed calls for Musk to form a new holding company under that name, although he dismissed the idea of X acquiring his businesses.

The concept for X solidified in October 2022, when Musk tweeted that acquiring Twitter is "an accelerant to creating X, the Super app". According to Musk, Twitter would accelerate the creation of X by "3 to 5 years". Musk expressed interest in creating an app similar to WeChat—a Chinese instant messaging, social media, and mobile payment app—on a podcast in May 2022. In June, Musk told Twitter employees that Twitter is a "digital town square" that should be all-encompassing, like WeChat. In a Morgan Stanley conference in March 2023, Musk touted X once again as the potentially "biggest financial institution in the world". On October 27, 2022, Musk acquired Twitter for $44 billion, and subsequently became its CEO.

=== Formation (2023–present) ===
On March 9, 2023, Musk registered X Corp. in Nevada. On the same day, Musk registered the artificial intelligence (AI) company X.AI Corp. Later that month, Musk applied to merge X Holdings with X Holdings Corp. and Twitter, Inc. with X Corp. In the filing, Musk revealed that X Holdings Corp. had $2 million in capital, but X Holdings Corp. would serve as the parent company for X Corp. In a company-wide email that month, Musk announced that Twitter employees would receive stock in X Corp.

In an April 2023 court filing for an ongoing lawsuit filed by political activist Laura Loomer against Twitter and its former CEO Jack Dorsey, Twitter, Inc. notified the court that it had been consolidated into X Corp., a Nevada corporation based in Carson City. A similar filing was made in the U.S. District Court for the Southern District of Florida.

On May 11, 2023, Musk tweeted that he had found his replacement as Twitter and X Corp.'s CEO. The next day, on May 12, 2023, he named Linda Yaccarino as the new CEO, adding that she "will focus primarily on business operations, while I focus on product design & new technology". Musk said he would transition his role to executive chairman and chief technology officer. Yaccarino succeeded Musk on June 5, 2023.

At the end of May 2023, Fidelity Investments estimated the company's value at $15 billion. This was later increased to a value of $27 billion by July, and up to about $28.5 billion by the end of August. In March 2025, the value of the social media platform has soared back to the $44 billion.

The company erected a giant illuminated "X" on the roof of its San Francisco headquarters in July 2023 without obtaining required permits. 24 complaints were filed by neighbors concerned about the bright flashing light and structural integrity. Inspectors were twice denied roof access, and the city cited the company for a building code violation. X removed the sign after a few days.

In August 2023, CEO Linda Yaccarino stated that she has "operational autonomy" under owner Elon Musk to run the business, and that she is involved in everything that goes into running the company. Yaccarino also opened up on the reasoning behind Twitter's "controversial" name change to X, wherein she stated that the rebranding was essentially a "liberation" from Twitter. Yaccarino also went on to say that if users had stayed with Twitter, then changes would only be "incremental" and that with X, they think about "what's possible".

In October 2023, the marketing agency X Social Media filed a lawsuit against X Corp. alleging a violation of its trademark of the letter X.

On July 16, 2024, Elon Musk posted that X Corp. would move its headquarters from San Francisco to Austin, Texas, after posting that SpaceX would move its headquarters from Hawthorne, California to Starbase, Texas. This was a direct response to California Governor Gavin Newsom signing a law that bans schools in the state from notifying parents of a child's gender identification change.

On August 17, 2024, X Corp. ceased operations in Brazil. The X platform was blocked nationwide shortly after and unblocked on October 8, 2024.

On September 13, 2024, X Corp. moved its headquarters from San Francisco to Bastrop, Texas, according to records filed with the California Secretary of State.

At the end of September 2024, Fidelity's estimation of the value of X shares reflected a decline of 79% from when Musk had acquired Twitter two years earlier.

Mahmoud Reza Banki joined the company as its first publicly announced chief financial officer in November 2024.

On January 1, 2025, X Corp. registered to do business in the State of Texas under the assumed name “X Internet Corp.” According to records filed with the Texas Secretary of State, X Corp. designated CT Corporation System as its registered agent for service of process.

In February 2025, Musk was reportedly in talks for a new round of financing at a $44 billion valuation, thus returning to the valuation at the time of the purchase of Twitter.

On March 28, 2025, Elon Musk announced that xAI acquired the company. The deal, an all-stock transaction, valued X at $33 billion, with a full valuation of $45 billion when factoring in $12 billion in debt. Meanwhile, xAI was valued at $80 billion. Both companies became subsidiaries of a new entity called X.AI Holdings Corp.

On July 9, 2025, Linda Yaccarino announced that she would be stepping down from the company.

== Controversies ==
=== Center for Countering Digital Hate ===
On June 1, 2023, the Center for Countering Digital Hate (CCDH) reported that X, formerly named Twitter, had "failed to act" on 99% of hate posted by Twitter Blue subscribers. The CCDH then described several tweets containing such hateful messages that allegedly contained "racist, homophobic, neo-Nazi, antisemitic or conspiracy content".

In response, X Corp. mentioned that the platform encouraged diversity and free speech, stating that "more than 99.99% of post impressions are healthy" in a blog post. The post further mentioned that the CCDH was spreading "false and misleading claims" that might have negative financial repercussions as it encouraged advertisers to halt investment on X. The blog also further described the CCDH as a "scare campaign" working continuously to prevent "public dialogue", alleging that the CCDH's research utilized metrics that were purposely put "out of context to make unsubstantiated assertions about X". X then filed a legal claim against CCDH and the European Climate Foundation, which it alleged was providing the information used in CCDH's research, and that X denied all claims stated by the CCDH.

On March 25, 2024, District Judge Charles Breyer determined the case was a strategic lawsuit against public participation and granted CCDH's special motion to strike X Corp.'s suit, writing that "This case is about punishing the Defendants for their speech".

=== Antisemitism ===
On November 16, 2023, Media Matters for America, a left-leaning watchdog group, published a report stating that X was placing ads for various companies including Apple, IBM, and Oracle, alongside pro-Nazi content. Published following Musk's endorsement of an antisemitic conspiracy theory, major advertisers like Microsoft and Apple left the platform, leading to an estimated loss of around $75 million by the end of 2023. This led to a lawsuit by X Corp. against Media Matters, alleging that it had "exploited" the platform into making the ads appear the way they did as a result of excessive scrolling and curating its feed with "fringe" content.

=== Litigation ===
In August 2024, Omid Kordestani, former executive chairman of Twitter (now X Corp.), filed a lawsuit against X Corp. in California Superior Court. Kordestani alleges that Elon Musk is refusing to cash out more than $20 million worth of shares owed to him as compensation for his service. This suit follows a March 2024 lawsuit by four former Twitter executives, who claim Musk withheld over $128 million in severance payments after their dismissal.

In August 2024, X filed a lawsuit against the Global Alliance for Responsible Media (GARM) for "conspiring" to "collectively withhold billions in advertising" revenue from the company. The boycotts by companies CVS, Unilever, Mars Inc., Ørsted and other companies not specifically named in the lawsuit were alleged to be a "coercive exercise of market power" and a violation of antitrust laws. As a result, the GARM ceased operations citing limited resources. In February 2025, an amended complaint named Nestlé, Abbott Laboratories, Colgate-Palmolive, Lego, Pinterest, Tyson Foods and Shell International and accused them of "celebrating" when X did not do as well as expected.

In 2026, the Federal Court of Australia upheld a regulatory fine against X Corp. after the company admitted it had failed to fully comply with a transparency notice issued in 2023 by Australia’s eSafety Commissioner regarding child sexual exploitation and online safety measures. The regulator found that X did not provide complete responses to questions concerning its policies and enforcement practices, which led to enforcement action. The court ruled that X had contravened Australia’s Online Safety Act by not providing the required information within the specified timeframe. The dispute, which began in early 2023, ended with X accepting liability for the noncompliance. The court ordered X Corp. to pay a civil penalty of 650,000 Australian dollars, along with 100,000 Australian dollars in legal costs. X’s legal representatives said the issue occurred during a period of corporate transition following Elon Musk’s acquisition of Twitter.
