= Period-tracking app =

App to track the menstrual cycle

Period-tracking apps are mobile applications used to track the menstrual cycle. They may be used to predict menstruation, to plan fertility, and to track health. Examples include Clue, Glow, and Flo.

== Function ==
Users enter their dates of menstruation, and frequently other experiences such as vaginal discharge and spotting; premenstrual syndrome; changes in mood; menstrual cramps and other pain; and other symptoms such as appetite changes, bloating, and acne. The apps predict the date of users' next period, and often also their ovulation and fertile window.

Some apps have additional features such as contraceptive reminders, educational content, tracking modes for use during pregnancy, or the ability to share one's menstrual cycle data with a partner.

== Privacy ==
Period-tracking apps collect personal health data, potentially raising concerns about privacy. Researchers have warned that data may be transferred to third parties and used for consumer profiling and targeted advertising, used for employment and health insurance discrimination, or used to prosecute users for seeking abortions.

After the 2022 decision by the United States Supreme Court to overturn Roe v. Wade, and the bans and restrictions on abortion in many US states that followed, many American women uninstalled the apps amidst fear that the data could be accessed by law enforcement and used to prosecute users. WIRED published a ranking of several period-tracking apps by data privacy.

== See also ==
- Femtech
