= Max Levchin =

Ukrainian-American software engineer

- Максиміліан Левчин
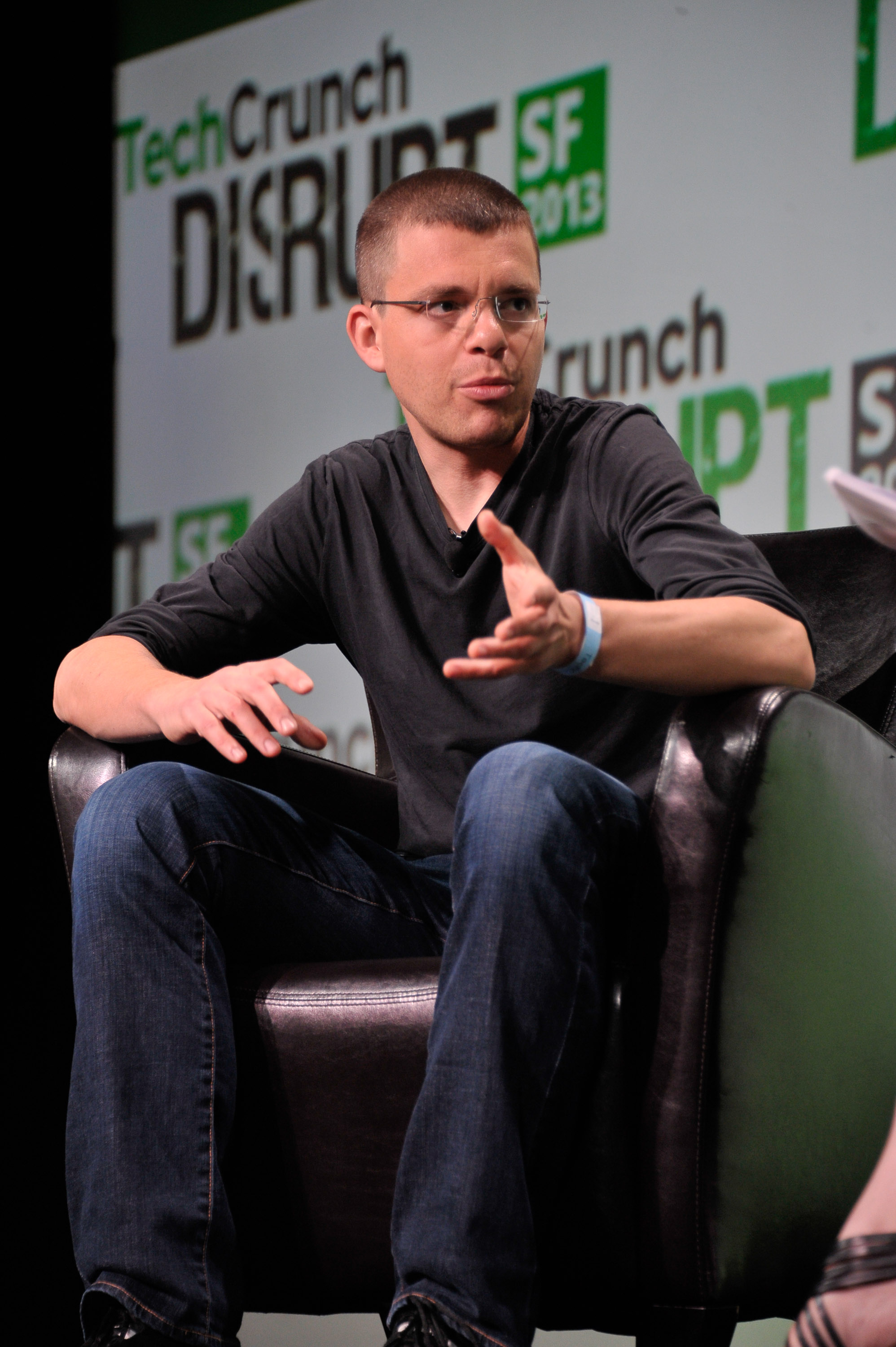
- Levchin at TechCrunch Disrupt SF 2013 in San Francisco, California
- Born: Maksymilian Rafailovych Levchyn; July 11, 1975 (age 51); Kiev, Ukrainian SSR, Soviet Union (now Kyiv, Ukraine)
- Education: University of Illinois at Urbana-Champaign (BS)
- Occupations: CEO of Affirm; Co-founder and former CTO of PayPal
- Spouse: Nellie Minkova (m. 2008)
- Children: 2
- Website: www.levchin.com

Maksymilian Rafailovych "Max" Levchin (Note: Ukrainian: Максиміліан Рафаїлович Левчин, romanized: Maksymilian Rafailovych Levchyn) (born July 11, 1975) is a Ukrainian-American software engineer and entrepreneur who is the co-founder and CEO of Affirm, a buy now, pay later financial services company, and co-founded PayPal as Confinity in 1998, leading the company as chief technology officer before its acquisition by eBay in 2002.

At PayPal, Levchin made contributions to PayPal's anti-fraud efforts and was the co-creator of the Gausebeck-Levchin test, one of the first commercial implementations of a CAPTCHA challenge response human test.

Levchin was a producer for the movie Thank You for Smoking.

== Early life and education ==
Born in Kyiv, then part of the Ukrainian SSR, to a Ukrainian-Jewish family, Levchin moved to the United States and settled in Chicago in 1991. In an interview with Emily Chang of Bloomberg, Levchin discussed his overcoming adversity as a child. He had respiratory problems and doctors doubted his chance of living. With guidance from his grandmother and his parents he took up the clarinet to expand his lung capacity. He attended Mather High School, and then the University of Illinois at Urbana-Champaign, where he earned a bachelor's degree in computer science in 1997.

== Business career ==
In the summer of 1995, Levchin and fellow University of Illinois students Luke Nosek and Scott Banister founded SponsorNet New Media.

=== PayPal ===
In 1998, Levchin and Peter Thiel founded Fieldlink, a security company that allowed users to store encrypted data on their PalmPilots and other PDA devices for handheld devices to serve as "digital wallets". After changing the company name to Confinity, they developed a popular payment product, calling it PayPal and focusing on digital funds transfer by PDA. The company merged with X.com in 2000, and in 2001, the company adopted the name PayPal after its main product. PayPal, Inc. went public in February 2002, and in July 2002 was acquired by eBay. Levchin's 2.3% stake in PayPal was worth approximately $34 million at the time of the acquisition.

Levchin is widely known for his contributions to PayPal's anti-fraud efforts and is also the co-creator of the Gausebeck-Levchin test, one of the first commercial implementations of a CAPTCHA.

In 2002, he was named to the MIT Technology Review TR100 as one of the top 100 innovators in the world under the age of 35, as well as Innovator of the Year.

Levchin is one of a group of roughly twenty founders and former employees of PayPal who have become referred to as the "PayPal Mafia", due to their success in founding and investing in tech companies after leaving PayPal. He is sometimes referred to as the consigliere of the PayPal Mafia. When asked in 2020 whether the PayPal Mafia really existed, he said that, "'PayPal mafia' doesn’t bother me much because the original article that used it in 2007 described me as the consigliere, and I always thought the 'consigliere' was the coolest guy in a mafia." He recalled deliberately screening for entrepreneurial ambition during hiring at PayPal, favoring candidates whose goal was to eventually start their own companies. He hoped that the dynamic can be replicated at Affirm.

=== Slide ===
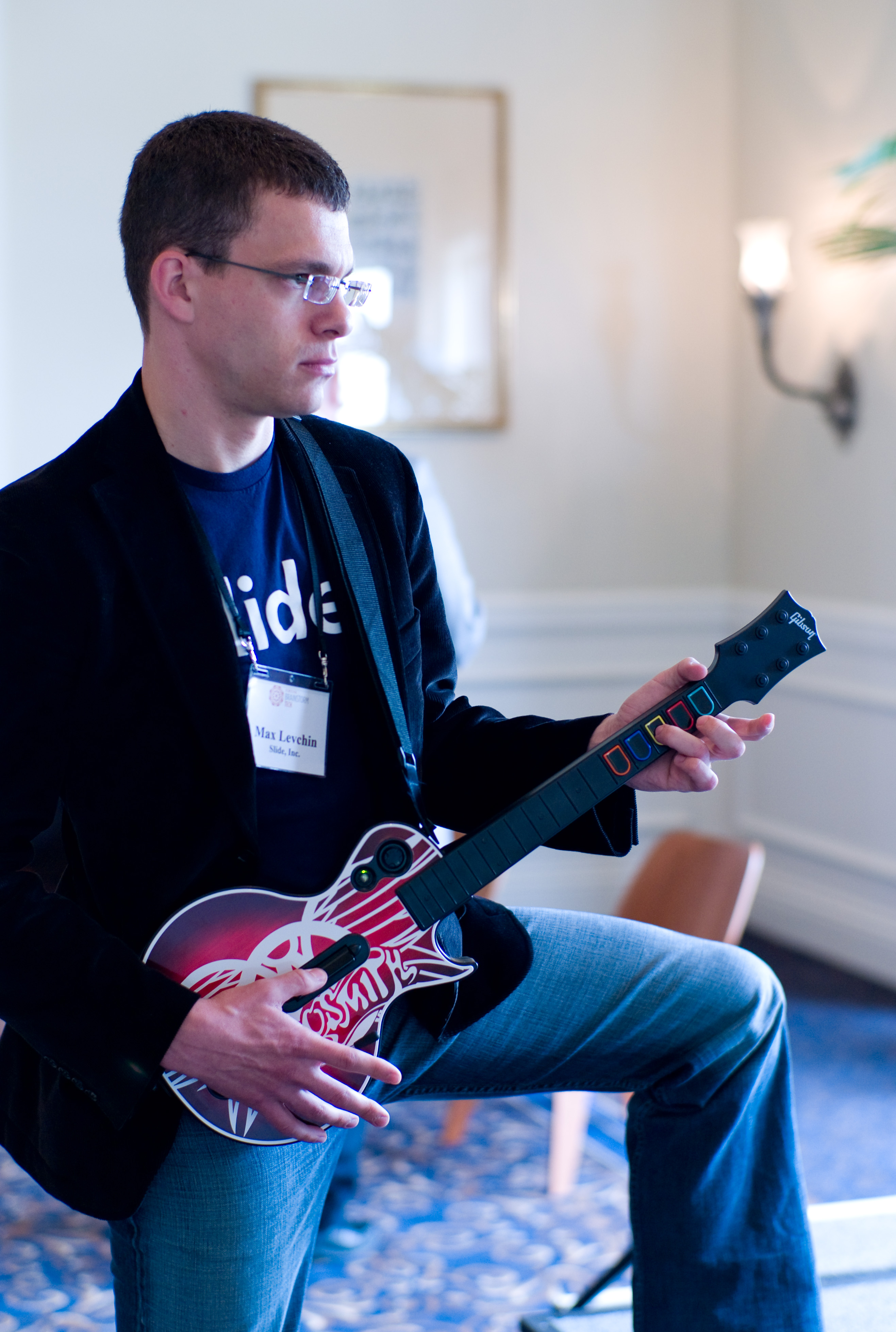
Max Levchin seen playing Guitar Hero at a conference

In 2004, Levchin founded Slide, a personal media-sharing service for social networking sites such as Myspace and Facebook. Slide was sold to Google in August 2010 for $182 million and, on August 25, Levchin joined the company as vice president of engineering. On August 26, 2011, Google announced it was shutting down Slide, and that Levchin was leaving the company.

=== HVF and Affirm ===
In late 2011, Levchin started a company called HVF (standing for "Hard, Valuable, and Fun") that was intended to explore and fund projects and companies in the area of leveraging data, such as data from analog sensors.

In early 2012, the financial technology company Affirm was spun out of HVF, with the goal of building the next-generation credit network. Affirm was created by Levchin, Palantir Technologies co-founder Nathan Gettings, and Jeff Kaditz of First Data. The company is based in San Francisco. After Affirm had its initial public offering, Levchin's stake was estimated at $2.5 billion.

In 2013, HVF launched Glow, a fertility app that helps couples conceive naturally.

HVF also invests in Emerald Therapeutics, a company which applies cloud computing to drug discovery.

=== Nyca Partners ===
Levchin and the venture fund Nyca Partners have maintained a long-time relationship. Nyca was an early investor in his firm Affirm, and he once served as investment partner at Nyca. He joined the firm since its launch in 2014. He was still listed as an investment partner in January 2017. In 2020, Affirm alumnus Jeremy Solomon joined Nyca through the connection with Levchin. Nyca also backs identity verification startup SentiLink and debt-collection company TrueAccord together with Levchin.

=== Scifi VC ===
Scifi VC was founded in 2010. Levchin's wife Nellie Levchin was his co-founder. He credits her with many of the fund's most successful deals as well as angel investments. The firm brands itself as an "early stage generalist firm", which focuses on fintech, science, and AI. Its portfolio companies include Anduril, Uber, Stripe,, and Capchase (fintech)

Recently it has invested in the ocean-based data center company Panthalassa together with Peter Thiel.

== Board memberships and other investments ==
Levchin was a key early investor in Yelp, an online social networking and review service that started in 2004. He was the company's largest shareholder, owning more than 7 million shares as of 2012. Levchin served as chairman of Yelp's board of directors from its founding, until July 2015. An angel investor in Mixpanel, its founder Suhail Doshi credits Levchin for Mixpanel's survival and subsequent success. He is also a seed investors in companies like WePay, ClearTax, SmartThings, Vurb (now part of Snap Inc.), Zendrive. He is an angel investor in AngelList alongside Chad Hurley and David Sacks.

Other investments of Levchin include AdRoll, Square, TransferWise, Pinterest, Crunchyroll. He also invests in companies associated with Affirm like SentiLink (founded by Affirm alumni Naftali Harris and Max Blumenfeld, and funded also by David Sacks's Craft Ventures) and Resolve (Affirm spinout founded by Chris Tsai).

Levchin is an investor in Evernote. He served on the company's board of directors from August 7, 2006, to 2016. He has also been on the boards of Kaggle, Quid, Yahoo, SF Symphony, Unity Technologies.

In December 2012, Levchin joined Yahoo's board of directors, and remained until December 2015.

In 2015, Levchin was appointed to the U.S. Consumer Financial Protection Bureau (CFPB) advisory board for a three-year term, making him the first executive from Silicon Valley to be appointed to the board. In 2021, Levchin, after his experience on the advisory board at the CFPB, called for the necessity for the tech industry to engage more with regulators.

As of 2021 Levchin had an estimated net worth of US$3 billion.

In October 2025, Levchin was elected a director of The Coca-Cola Company.

== In the media ==
Levchin appeared as a speaker at the 2007 Startup School organized by Y Combinator, where he described his own journey as an entrepreneur and the mistakes he made and lessons he learned. Levchin was also featured in "Brilliant Issue" of Portfolio by Condé Nast Publications. In 2022 Levchin was interviewed in an NPR podcast called "How I Built This" where he spoke about his early life and business endeavors including his role in PayPal.

== Politics ==
Levchin was listed as one of the contributors to FWD.us, a Silicon Valley–based lobbying group spearheaded by Mark Zuckerberg and Joe Green. The group is intended to concentrate on immigration liberalization for high-skilled immigrants to the United States, improvements to education, and facilitating technological breakthroughs with broad public benefits. Levchin also narrated his personal experience as an immigrant in a video released by the group.

In 2013, amidst the controversy over mass surveillance and NSA espionage activities, Levchin defended the NSA in opposition to views of many other tech entrepreneurs. According to him, the agency was designed to protect the US from terrorism, so even if it oversteps its bounds, the public should support it.

In a 2019 interview with Yahoo Finance, Levchin stated he agreed something needed to be done about income inequality in the United States, but disagreed that the solution should involve a form of democratic socialism, as suggested by Alexandria Ocasio-Cortez. Even though her proposals did not include government ownership of "everything" as he implied, Levchin warned of the state of Ukraine's economy around the time of the Soviet Union's collapse, recounting, "there were tanks on the streets, because we couldn't — couldn't contain the populace from tearing the country apart."

== Other activity ==
Levchin arranged and financed the Levchin Prize which since 2016 rewards advancements in cryptography with a real-world impact.

In April 2026, he was ranked on the Forbes list, "Self-Made 250: The Greatest Living Self-Made Americans".

== Personal life ==
In 2008, Levchin married his longtime girlfriend, Nellie Minkova. He has two children. He lived in San Francisco from 2007 to 2019. In 2019, he listed his home in San Francisco for $7.25 million, which he originally purchased in 2007 for $5.3 million.
