= Stephen Oskoui =

American businessman

- Born: July 15, 1980 (age 44); U.S.
- Education: Stanford University
- Occupation: Venture capitalist

Stephen Oskoui is an American investor and venture capitalist who is managing partner and co-founder of Gigafund, a venture capital firm backing entrepreneurs globally. Gigafund makes long-term concentrated investments in founders and CEOs who are capable of growing with their companies and maximizing impact over a period of decades.

== Personal life and education ==
Oskoui studied computer science at Stanford University. His accomplishments include publishing research in laser fusion and being named one of 40 Finalists in the acclaimed Westinghouse Science Talent Search.

== Career ==
Oskoui launched Gigafund together with Luke Nosek (co-founder of PayPal and Founders Fund). Before co-founding Gigafund, Oskoui was a venture partner at Founders Fund.

Prior to Founders Fund, Oskoui was founder and CEO of Smiley Media, a performance-based marketing company. Smiley raised no outside capital and grew into a two-time Inc. 500 company with $50 million in annual revenue. Oskoui was one of the first to apply A/B testing to run millions of marketing experiments. He built Smiley Media using a unique distributed team structure, recruiting hundreds of people from over 20 different countries.

As an angel investor, he made a $3 million investment in Rover and drove the mergers and acquisitions process that resulted in its merger with Revcontent.

== Political activities ==
Oskoui, Jeffrey Harmon, Abe Niederhauser, and Ladd Christensen co-founded Endorse Liberty, a Super PAC supporting Ron Paul. Oskoui serves as president of the organization. Oskoui helped convince Peter Thiel, the founder of PayPal, to donate over $2 million to Endorse Liberty. In 2012, Oskoui donated $125,000 and provided $296,000 in in-kind media services.
