= Jon McNeill =

American businessman

- Born: 1966 or 1967 (age 58–59); Nebraska, U.S.
- Education: Northwestern University (BA in economics)
- Occupations: Business executive Investor; Entrepreneur
- Years active: 1989–present
- Known for: Former president of global sales, marketing, policy, and services at Tesla, Inc. Former chief operating officer, Lyft
- Title: Chief executive officer, DVx Ventures
- Board member of: General Motors; Lululemon Athletica; Asurion

Jon McNeill is an American business executive, investor, and entrepreneur. He serves as the chief executive officer of DVx Ventures, a venture capital firm. Previously, he served as president of global sales, marketing, policy, and services at Tesla, Inc., and chief operating officer of Lyft, and has held board positions at companies including General Motors, Lululemon Athletica, and Asurion.

McNeill was named "Most Admired CEO" in Boston by the Boston Business Journal in 2013.

== Early life and education ==
McNeill grew up in Kearney, Nebraska, where he attended Kearney High School and graduated in 1985. During his youth, he founded a lawn-mowing business that grew to over 100 commercial accounts and multiple employees by the time he graduated high school, providing the funds for his university education. He later earned a degree in economics from Northwestern University.

== Career ==
=== Early career and entrepreneurship ===
McNeill began his career at Bain & Co. in 1989 working under Mitt Romney. Before joining Tesla in 2015, he had started and sold six companies, including Sterling Collision Centers, Midwest Cycling, and Before You Move. He founded and served as CEO of Sterling Collision Centers until its acquisition by Allstate in 2001. In 2006, he became CEO of Enservio, a SaaS-based applications provider, where he remained until 2015.

=== Tesla and Lyft ===
McNeill was introduced to Elon Musk by Sheryl Sandberg in 2015 and served as Tesla's president of global sales, marketing, policy, and services between 2015 and 2018. In 2018, he joined Lyft as its chief operating officer.

=== Board and advisory roles ===
In 2016, McNeill joined Lululemon Athletica's board of directors. He also served on the board of TruMotion, a safe-driving app he co-founded through the Harvard Innovation Lab, which later merged with Cambridge Mobile Telematics. In 2019, he became an advisory partner for Advent International. He has served on the boards of Tekion, CrossFit, and Stash, which was acquired by Grab for $425 million in February 2026. He was also appointed to Asurion's board of directors in 2022. That same year, he was appointed to the board of directors of General Motors (GM), followed by his appointment as vice chairman of the Cruise board in November 2023 alongside GM CEO Mary Barra, who served as chair.

=== DVx Ventures ===
In April 2020, McNeill co-founded venture incubator DVx Ventures, then DeltaV. As of January 2025, DVx had launched 12 companies, including VistaShares, and raised approximately $100 million in funds.

=== Publications ===
In March 2026, McNeill published The Algorithm: The Hypergrowth Formula That Transformed Tesla, Lululemon, General Motors, and SpaceX, a business book about scaling organizations and operational growth.
