= Eric M. Jackson =

American businessman

- Born: c. 1976 (age 49–50)
- Education: Stanford University (1998)
- Occupation: CEO/co-founder of CapLinked
- Known for: Former VP of marketing at PayPal

Eric M. Jackson is the co-founder of CapLinked, a project management and business transaction company. He is founder and former CEO of World Ahead Publishing (which was purchased by WorldNetDaily in 2007), and is a former vice president of marketing at PayPal. He is one of the PayPal Mafia, a growing number of PayPal alumni who have started new ventures after eBay bought the online payments firm.

== Career ==
In 1998, Jackson received a B.A. in economics with honors from Stanford University. He served on the board of directors of The Stanford Review. Jackson maintains the book publishing industry blog called Conservative Publisher.

In 2005, Jackson accused Google of political bias for removing online ads for a book critical of Bill Clinton. Google responded that no previously approved ads had been removed.

Jackson's own book The PayPal Wars (ISBN 0-9746701-0-3) chronicles PayPal's origins and discusses the legal, regulatory, and competitive threats entrepreneurs must overcome in today's business environment. It has been profiled by Reason Magazine, The Washington Times, the Mises Institute, Tech Central Station, and Tom Peters.

Jackson appears as a conservative commentator on radio and television programs. He has been quoted in Forbes, BusinessWeek, TheStreet.com, U.S. News & World Report, and Publishers Weekly, among other publications.
