= Glow (app) =

Menstruation and ovulation tracking app

- Developer: Glow Inc.
- Release: 2013; 13 years ago
- Operating system: iOS; Android
- Type: Period-tracking and fertility app
- Website: glowing.com

Glow is a fertility awareness and period-tracking app focused on women's reproductive health and childcare, which includes Glow Eve, a dedicated period tracker, Glow Nurture, a pregnancy tracker, and Glow Baby, a baby development tracker.

The Glow company also operates an online shop that sells several fertility-related products, including ovulation test strips, pregnancy tests, and wearable breast pumps.

As of 2024, Glow reported to have approximately 25 million users across its applications and community message boards.

== History ==
Glow released in August 2013 as an iOS app. It was founded by Michael Huang and Max Levchin and launched with $6 million in Series A funding from venture capital firms Founders Fund and Andreesen Horowitz. In 2014, Glow raised an additional $17 million in Series B funding, with Formation 8 joining existing investors.

In 2015, Glow launched Ruby, an app dedicated to sexual health. That year, Wired reported that the company had added features to their apps allowing men to monitor their fertility. Glow subsequently released an additional set of apps focused on pregnancy tracking and infant development.

In 2016, Glow reported that it had a total of approximately 3 million users; by 2018, this had grown to 15 million. Vox described it as one of the “big two” period and fertility tracking apps and the one that had started the “boom” in the femtech space.

== Application and features ==
Glow was initially described as a fertility application that applied data-driven methods to menstrual and ovulation tracking. Core features include cycle logging, ovulation prediction, and symptom tracking. The app also provides educational content related to reproductive health and childcare, as well as a set of online message boards that allow individuals to share experiences and seek peer support.

== Reception ==
In 2014, Fast Company reported that 20,000 women had used Glow to conceive. Later that year, The Guardian included Glow Nurture on its list of the best iPhone apps of 2014. Media coverage often praised Glow's array of menstrual tracking options, although some reviews also noted that fertility apps are not birth control tools and cautioned against relying on them for that purpose.

In 2019, Cosmopolitan singled Glow's community of users as one of its standout features.

== Privacy and legal issues ==
Glow has received attention regarding privacy and data security practice. In 2016, Consumer Reports identified vulnerabilities that it said could have exposed user information. Glow stated in The Washington Post that it addressed the issues and found no evidence that user data had been compromised.

In September 2020, the California Attorney General announced a settlement with Glow related to Consumer Reports’ findings, which included a $250,000 civil penalty.

After this surge of media interest, a research team affiliated with the University of New South Wales conducted an investigation into the privacy practices of several popular fertility apps, including Glow. Their review of Glow was mixed, noting that they provided several privacy settings and de-identified sensitive data, but that user information could still be disclosed in the future if the app was sold. Glow rejected that claim, telling the Australian Associated Press that it "did not share" personal data. The company also cited several internal security measures it had implemented and its apps' offline data protection setting, which allows users to permanently delete their health-related data.
