= The PayPal Wars =

2004 non-fiction book by Eric M. Jackson

The PayPal Wars: Battles with eBay, the Media, the Mafia, and the Rest of Planet Earth
- First edition cover
- Author: Eric M. Jackson
- Publisher: World Ahead Publishing
- Publication date: September 20, 2004
- ISBN: 9780974670102

The PayPal Wars: Battles with eBay, the Media, the Mafia, and the Rest of Planet Earth (2004) is a book by former PayPal marketing executive Eric M. Jackson.

== Description ==
The PayPal Wars is an insider's perspective on the people and events that helped create the company, and its acquisition by eBay in 2002. The book recounts PayPal's clashes with lawyers, regulators, and the American Mafia. Many of PayPal's founding employees went on to start other companies like LinkedIn, YouTube, and Yelp, Inc.; they would become known as the PayPal Mafia.

== Critical reception ==
The PayPal Wars received acclaim for its writing style and personal narrative. The Washington Times said the book is "an absorbing insider's story." Radley Balko of Reason said that it "reads like a spy novel", while David R. Henderson of TCS Daily said, "It's rare that a business book is a page turner, but The PayPal Wars is". Tom Peters said The PayPal Wars "gives the best description of 'business strategy' unfolding in a world changing at warp speed."

== Editions ==
- The PayPal Wars: Battles with eBay, the Media, the Mafia, and the Rest of Planet Earth, World Ahead Publishing, ISBN 0-9746701-0-3
