= Omaze =

Online fundraising platform

- Formation: September 2012
- Founder: Ryan Cummins; Matthew Pohlson
- Headquarters: London, England
- Key people: Matthew Pohlson (CEO)
- Website: omaze.com

Omaze is a for-profit entertainment company that partners with charities in fundraising events. To enter the draw for the prizes, customers purchase an entry or subscribe, with a percentage of sales going to charity. Businessmen Matthew Pohlson and Ryan Cummins established the organisation in the US in 2012. It initially specialised in celebrity-experience draws, before switching focus to UK house draws in 2020. Omaze has raised more than $300 million for charities as of August 2026.

== History ==
Pohlson and Cummins met at Stanford University in the late 1990s. In July of 2012, they launched Omaze, which offered the chance to win experiences through sweepstakes, while also raising money for charities.

In 2018, co-founder Ryan Cummins left the company, while Pohlson remained as CEO.

In 2020, Omaze introduced the Million Pound House Draw in the UK, offering the chance to win luxury homes while supporting charitable causes. By 2023, Omaze had fully transitioned to the house draw model and relocated its headquarters from Los Angeles to London. The company paused operations in the U.S. but continued its efforts in the UK, and as of 2025, in Germany as well.

Each account on Omaze UK is limited to £500 of entries per calendar month. In the United Kingdom, Omaze gives each monthly charity partner a guaranteed £1 million donation, alongside a separate, multi-year philanthropic grant. As of August 2026, Omaze has raised over £150 million for UK charities. In Germany, the company guarantees charities a minimum of €500k. Select homes have been raffled off in Dorfen, Flensburg Fjord, and the Mecklenburg Lake District.

== Business model and house draws ==
Omaze's previous US model started as a privately owned, for-profit company that had two models. Sweepstake entries for a celebrity experience see 60% of the money donated to charity, 25% towards fees and Omaze's costs for advertising and creating content for the event, and 15% to Omaze as profit.

Since 2020, Omaze has operated a fundraising model that offers the chance to win prizes and luxury homes. For each draw, Omaze partners with a charity. A fixed percentage covers the cost of the draw and prize, with the remaining portion paid to the charity partner.

The inaugural draw featured a £1 million property in Cheshire and raised £250,000 for Teenage Cancer Trust. As of 2026, Omaze has awarded 50 homes with an average value of £4 million.

In May 2026, Omaze gave away a home worth more than £5,000,000 overlooking Lake Windermere. As of August 2026, Omaze has given away more than £250 million worth of prizes in the UK since launch.

== Contests ==
Omaze offers prize draws in which entrants are encouraged to contribute financially to a charitable cause, with the amount given determining the number of sweepstake entries that the person receives.

Sweepstakes systems such as Omaze include a no-purchase-necessary clause to comply with fundraising and gaming regulations. In the United Kingdom, participants may submit a postal entry with no fee.

In January 2023, Omaze paused operations in the United States. Due to the move, on 9 December 2022, Omaze laid off 103 employees.
