= Russel Simmons =

American businessman

- Born: United States
- Education: University of Illinois at Urbana–Champaign
- Occupation: Businessman

Russel Simmons is an American businessman. He co-founded Yelp, Inc. with Jeremy Stoppelman and served as CTO from July 2004 until he left in June 2010. Prior to co-founding Yelp, Simmons was a co-founder of PayPal, where he was a Lead Software Architect, and has been described as a member of the "PayPal Mafia". In 2014 he founded Learnirvana.

Simmons graduated from University of Illinois at Urbana–Champaign in 1998 with a Bachelor of Science in Computer Science.
