= Yu Pan =

Chinese-born software engineer

- Born: China
- Education: University of Illinois at Urbana-Champaign (BS)
- Occupations: Engineer, Entrepreneur
- Known for: Co-founder of PayPal and the very first employee of YouTube

Yu Pan is an engineer and entrepreneur who is one of the original six people who started PayPal and the first employee at YouTube, as an early software engineer. He is a former Google employee and also a co-founder of Kiwi Crate, Inc.

Pan received a BS degree in computer science from the University of Illinois at Urbana–Champaign. In 2007, Pan gained an Illinois Mathematics and Science Academy Alumni Award, and he is listed as a notable alumnus alongside technology entrepreneurs Steve Chen, Ramez Naam, Russel Simmons, and Sam Yagan.

Pan currently works as an R&D Engineer at Origin Protocol.
