= Confinity =

Former American software company

Confinity Inc.
- Industry: Software industry, online payments
- Founded: December 1998; 27 years ago
- Founders: Max Levchin, Peter Thiel, Luke Nosek, Ken Howery, Yu Pan
- Defunct: March 2000; 26 years ago
- Fate: Merged with X.com, eventually forming PayPal
- Successor: PayPal, Inc.
- Headquarters: Champaign County, Illinois, United States
- Products: PayPal

Confinity Inc. was an American software company based in Silicon Valley, best known as the creator of PayPal. It was founded in December 1998 by Max Levchin, Peter Thiel, Luke Nosek, Ken Howery, and Yu Pan initially as a PalmPilot payments and cryptography company before pivoting to an email-based payments product.

== Company ==
The company was launched in 1998 as Fieldlink and later renamed Confinity. Many of Confinity's initial recruits were alumni of The Stanford Review, also co-founded by Thiel, and most early engineers hailed from the University of Illinois at Urbana-Champaign, recruited by Levchin. Early investors included Nokia Ventures, Deutsche Bank, and William N. Melton, the founder of CyberCash.

Confinity's second office, 165 University Avenue in Palo Alto, California, is also known for being the former office of Google and Logitech.

Confinity launched its milestone product, PayPal, in late 1999. Confinity merged with X.com, founded by Elon Musk, in March 2000. The merged company became known as X.com because this was thought to be a name with broader long-term potential than Confinity or PayPal.

PayPal made an Initial Public Offering on the NASDAQ stock exchange on February 14, 2002. The company was purchased by eBay in a $1.3 billion stock deal announced on July 8, 2002. eBay and PayPal became separate companies in 2015.
