= X.com (bank) =

Defunct online bank

- Type: Private
- Founded: October 1999; 27 years ago Palo Alto, California, U.S.
- Founders: Elon Musk; Harris Fricker; Christopher Payne; Ed Ho
- Defunct: March 2000; 26 years ago
- Fate: Merged with Confinity, eventually forming PayPal
- Successor: PayPal (banking activities); X (social network) (URL and Banking)
- Website: x.com at the Wayback Machine (archived 2000-04-08)

X.com was an American online bank founded by Ed Ho, Harris Fricker, Elon Musk, and Christopher Payne in 1999 in Palo Alto, California. It merged with competitor Confinity in March 2000, retaining the X.com name, and the company changed its name to PayPal in 2001.

X.com was conceived as a broad online financial-services platform, offering internet-based banking services and person-to-person payments rather than only a payment-transfer product.

In 2022, Elon Musk acquired Twitter and rebranded it to X. The network started using the x.com domain in 2023.

== Business model ==
X.com developed and operated a financial services website with banking services provided by First Western National Bank, an FDIC-insured bank in La Jara, Colorado. The company was initially funded by Elon Musk and Greg Kouri, who went on to fund Musk's later ventures: Tesla and SpaceX.

Customers were not assessed fees or overdraft penalties. New member referrals were rewarded with a $20 cash card and a $10 card for each new sign-up. These features were unique for their time. For instance, customers could send money to another person by entering their email address into X.com. Additionally, customers could open an account strictly with online registration with no need to mail a check.

== History ==
Musk commented in a 1999 interview with CBS MarketWatch: "I think we're at the third stage now where people are ready to use the Internet as their main financial repository."

In January 1999, Musk sold his company Zip2 to Compaq. A month later, Musk invested about $12 million into co-founding X.com in March 1999 with Harris Fricker, Christopher Payne, and Ed Ho. Fricker worked with Musk when Musk was an intern at the Bank of Nova Scotia, Payne was a friend of Fricker, and Ho was an engineer at Silicon Graphics and executive at Zip2. The company was initially run from a house before moving to an office in Palo Alto.

Due to conflict on how to run the company, Musk fired Fricker five months after X.com had started, and the other two co-founders, Payne and Ho left consequently.

X.com officially launched on December 7, 1999, with former Intuit CEO Bill Harris serving as the inaugural CEO. Within two months, X.com attracted over 200,000 signups.

In January 2000, it was discovered that a security flaw allowed users of X.com who had the account number and bank routing number of any other bank account, even at other banks, could move money from that other account to their own and withdraw it. The problem existed for a month before it was discovered and corrected.

In March 2000, X.com merged with its competitor Confinity, a software company also based in Palo Alto which had developed an easy payment system named PayPal. The new company continued as X.com, though later took PayPal's name. Musk was its biggest shareholder and was appointed as its CEO. Started in 1998, PayPal enabled users with PalmPilots to send money to each other through the devices' infrared ports. Subsequently, PayPal developed to allow users to send money using email and the web.

In September 2000, when Musk was in Australia for a honeymoon trip, the X.com board voted for a change of CEO from Musk to Peter Thiel, the co-founder of Confinity, due to mismanagement on Musk's part. In June 2001, the X.com domain was changed to PayPal.com.

== Domain name ==
In July 2017, PayPal sold the domain x.com back to Elon Musk. Starting in 2023, x.com began being used by Twitter which had been acquired by Musk in 2022 and subsequently rebranded to X.
