= Founders Fund =

San Francisco-based venture capital firm

- Type: Venture fund
- Industry: Venture capital
- Founded: July 2005; 21 years ago
- Founders: Peter Thiel; Ken Howery; Luke Nosek
- Headquarters: Letterman Digital Arts Center; San Francisco, California, U.S.
- Key people: Peter Thiel; Luke Nosek; Mike Solana; Trae Stephens; Lauren Gross; Scott Nolan; Napoleon Ta
- AUM: US$17 billion (2025)
- Number of employees: 38 (2025)
- Website: www.foundersfund.com

Founders Fund is an American venture capital fund founded in 2005 based in San Francisco. The fund has roughly $17 billion in total assets under management as of 2025. The firm was founded by Peter Thiel, Ken Howery, and Luke Nosek.

Founders Fund was the first institutional investor in Space Exploration Technologies (SpaceX) and Palantir Technologies, and an early investor in Facebook. The firm's partners have been founders, early employees and investors at companies including PayPal, Palantir Technologies, Anduril Industries and SpaceX. The firm's investments include Airbnb, Anduril, DeepMind, Rippling, Facebook, Ramp, Palantir Technologies, Polymarket, Pudgy Penguins, SpaceX, Spotify, Stripe, Neuralink, and Nubank.

Notable partners include Peter Thiel, Trae Stephens, and Mike Solana. Former partners include Brian Singerman, Keith Rabois, Cyan Banister, Ken Howery, Kevin Hartz, Sean Parker, and Bruce Gibney.

== Funding history ==
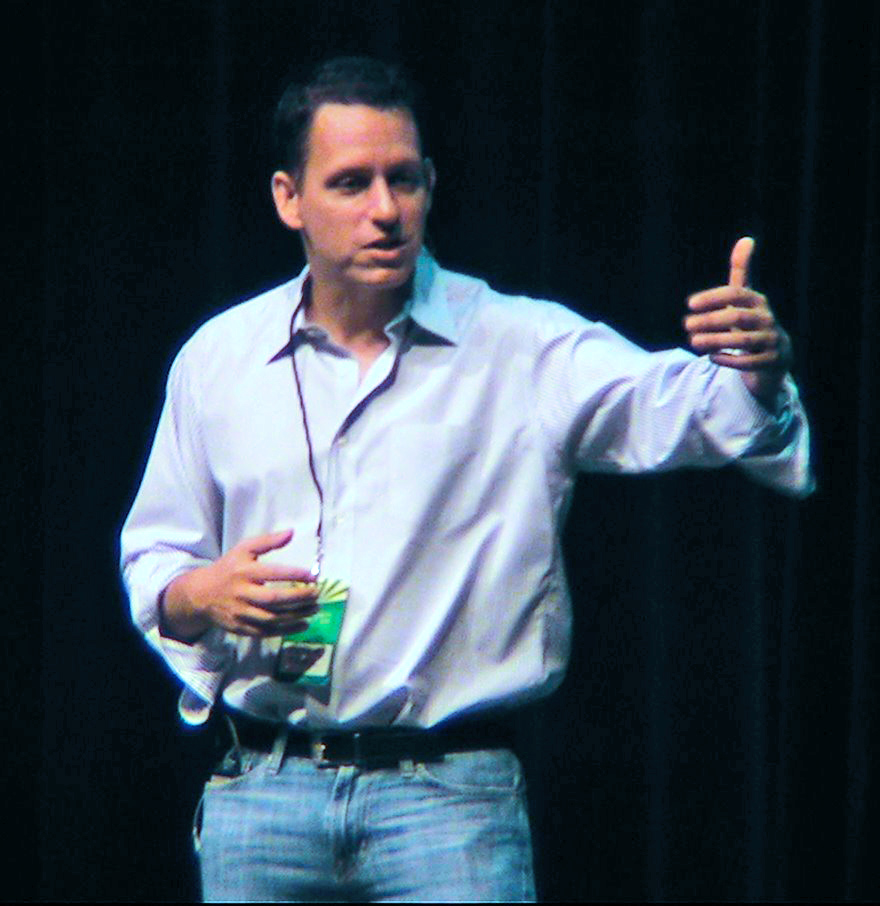
Peter Thiel, co-founder of the Founders Fund, in 2007

The firm was organized by Peter Thiel, Ken Howery, and Luke Nosek in early 2005 and raised its first fund of $50 million from individual entrepreneurs and angel investors in January of that year. Sean Parker, co-founder of Napster and ex-president of Facebook, joined in 2006. In 2007, the firm raised a new fund of $220 million.

In 2010, the firm raised its third fund, with $250 million in committed capital, and in 2011, a fourth fund with $625 million of committed capital was raised.

In 2014, Founders Fund raised a $1 billion fifth suite of funds, bringing the firm's aggregate capital under management to more than $2 billion.

In 2016, Founders Fund raised a sixth, $1.3 billion fund, bringing the firm's aggregate capital under management to more than $3 billion.

In 2020, Founders Fund raised a seventh flagship fund and its first growth fund, representing $3 billion in new capital and bringing the firm's aggregate capital under management to more than $6 billion.

In 2022, Founders Fund raised an eighth flagship fund and its second growth fund, representing over $5 billion in new capital and bringing the firm's aggregate capital under management to more than $11 billion.

In March 2023, Founders Fund cut the size of its eighth venture capital fund in half, from around $1.8 billion to around $900 million, to adapt to uncertain market conditions. This was the idea of Thiel, who thought "venture capital is due for a slimdown", which caused some resistance from inside the firm.

In 2025, Founders Fund raised its third growth fund, Founders Fund Growth III, at $4.6 billion for late-stage investments. Julie Bort of TechCrunch remarks that, "Founders Fund is so big and successful that it can always raise an oversubscribed fund should it choose to." The over-subscription seemed to anticipate an era of big VC spending, and also expansion of the defense sector. Meanwhile, CNBC commented that, "Hefty amounts of private capital are likely to be needed for the foreseeable future as the IPO market remains virtually dormant".

== Philosophy and development ==
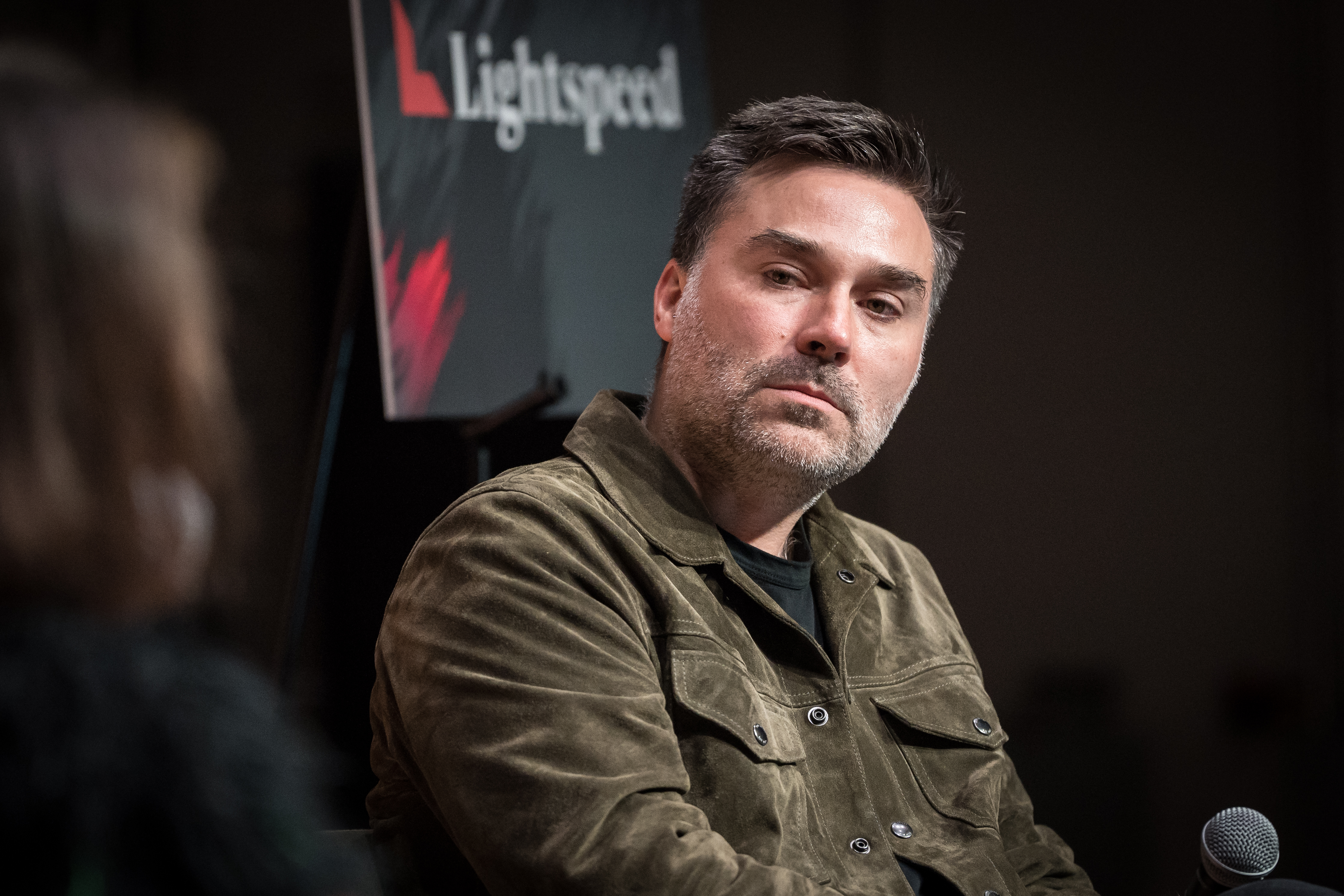
Trae Stephens at 2024 TechCrunch StrictlyVC event

The Founders Fund was conceptualized as an early-stage venture capital fund. From the start, it has adopted Thiel's contrarian attitude, and bet early and aggressively on companies with the founders it deemed deserving of trust. Early in its history, it made many investments in internet or social media and health and life science research, among which there were investments in Spotify, Airbnb, and Lyft. By 2006, Jessica Guynn of SFGate characterized it as a tiny but influential fund focusing on consumer internet, standing beside Thiel's then extraordinarily successful firm Clarium Capital.

Later, together with Thiel's disillusion with social media companies, the firm has gradually developed into a primary backer of hard tech and defense technology. In 2011, when the social bubble was still expanding, he complained, "Is Twitter worth $7 billion?" At this time, the Founders Fund had developed a portfolio in artificial intelligence, biotech and space technology. In 2017, it published the manifesto "What happened to the future?", written by Bruce Gibney. The manifesto denied that the Internet's potential had been exhausted, but emphasized that the Founders' Fund would focus on ambitious projects that resolved real challenges. The original subtitle was Thiel's famous motto "We wanted flying cars, instead we got 140 characters."

Julie Bort, the venture editor at Techcrunch remarks that it boasts perhaps the most formidable defense portfolio in the Silicon Valley. The Founders Fund, Andreessen Horowitz, America's Frontier Fund, as well as the leaders of these firms, namely Peter Thiel, Marc Andreessen and Eric Schmidt, are often considered the dominance forces in the new defense tech domain. Camden Mead writes on the website of the Utah Aerospace and Defense Association that, together with Andreessen Horowitz, the Founders Fund "has prioritized investing in revolutionary technologies, including various forms of autonomous vehicles. Both of these firms are relatively new to the defense space but are singlehandedly changing how traditional investors view the aerospace, deep tech, and defense ecosystem."

The firm also turned to investing in companies in both early and later stages of development. Its first fund dedicated to late-stage startups was created in 2019. At the annual meeting in September 2025, partners indicated the firm's third growth fund would invest about $460 million per company (with a total of 10 portfolio companies), compared with $225 million in its second fund (with 15 companies) and $55 million in its first (with 31 companies), showing a turn towards concentrated late-stage bets.

Structure-wise, there are three directors, each with powers to veto over any deals over $10 million. It is known, though, as in his other companies, that Thiel prefers to surround himself with people who share his thinking and loyal to him, and often manages to steer them to partnership, as seen in the cases of Keith Rabois, Sean Parker, Max Marmer or Trae Stephens. The tech writer Mario Gabriele writes that, "At the heart of Thiel’s power, influence, and wealth is Founders Fund. No organization has benefited more from his singular abilities, and those of the team he has assembled, than the venture firm."

Thiel and other partners invest substantial amounts of their own money in the fund. Thiel contributed $38 million to the Founders Fund's Fund 1 (2005). In 2023, Thiel invested $920 million (27%). By late 2018, the firm was returning $4.60 to its investors on every dollar invested. The industry average of that year was $2.11.

In October 2024, the Founders Fund hosted the invite-only "Hereticon: Apocalypse Ball", an event they described as "a conference for thoughtcrime", to display and celebrate "technologies and projects so ambitious, they will ultimately transform our world for the better – or destroy it". The invitation reads, "Maybe if you are not trying to destroy the world, you are not trying hard enough".

The firm has a longtime rivalry with one of Thiel's other venture companies, Mithril Capital.

=== Office in Miami ===
In 2021, the Founders Fund opened a Miami office.

Founders Fund, the venture studio Atomic (a Thiel-backed firm, founded by Jack Abraham) and their joint venture Opendoor (founded by Rabois and Abraham) share the same building in Wynwood.

Editor James Thorne of Pitchbook write that Miami Techweek (2021) was "tweeted into existence by venture capitalists Keith Rabois and Delian Asparouhov of San Francisco’s Founders Fund, with help from other notable transplants like David Blumberg of Blumberg Capital." The event marked "an informal experiment to see if a critical mass of money and hype could boost Miami from a startup laggard to a leader," and coincided with the opening or expanding of offices and expansion of activity by funds like Point72 Ventures, Thoma Bravo, G Squared, Blackstone and Softbank.

Saxon Baum of Florida Funders, described by Miami Herald as the top venture investor in Florida, said that his firm has done deals with Founders Fund, Softbank and Khosla to help these large funds work with the Florida ecosystem.

Founders Fund has invested in companies based in Miami and Florida like Lula, Hydra Host, and Traba.

The expansion of Founders Fund in Miami is also discussed in media in connection with Thiel's growing presence in Miami (he has a personal residence there since 2020, Thiel Capital opened an office in late 2025, Palantir moved to Miami from Denver in 2026).

== Personnel ==
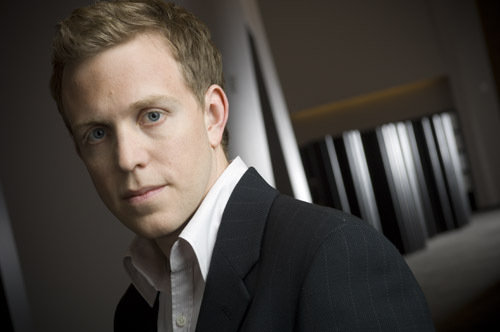
Ken Howery, co-founder, 2013

=== Founders ===
Ken Howery, co-founder and former partner, was also a co-founder of PayPal and the Founders Fund's first chief financial officer. At the Founders Fund, he led or co-led investments in Facebook, Quantcast, ZocDoc and Geni. He is now a diplomat, having served as the U.S. ambassador to Sweden, and has been confirmed by the Senate as the next U.S. ambassador to Denmark In his college years, he was the editor-in-chief of The Stanford Review, a student newspaper found by Thiel.

In 2017, Luke Nosek, one of the co-founders, left the Founders Fund to establish Gigafund, which focuses on space technology and Musk companies like Neuralink and the Boring Company (initially it mainly focused on SpaceX). The other Gigafund co-founder, Stephen Oskoui, is also a former Founders Fund investor. When at Founders Fund. Nosek led the investment in SpaceX and remains a board member ever since. Nosek was instrumental in the investment, at a time SpaceX was vulnerable. Thiel was persuaded, partly out of the desire to mend his personal relationship with Musk due to previous problems at PayPal (Thiel had also previously refused to invest in Tesla – Musk thinks it was because of his skepticism of climate change].

=== Current personnel ===
By April 2025, Peter Thiel, Napoleon Ta and Trae Stephens are listed as fund directors.

Currently the sole female partner is Lauren Gross, also the COO, who leads all non-investment activities from legal to finance.

Trae Stephens, also a partner, has played an important role in co-founding and developing companies incubated at the Founders Fund, including Anduril Industries (where he is now chairman), Sol (at one point Sindarin Inc.), which develops a wearable e-reader, Varda Space Industries (co-founder, alongside Thiel fellow Delian Asparouhov and former SpaceX engineer Will Bruey; also director), and Valinor Enterprises. In 2024, he co-founded Valinor alongside former Palantir's senior vice president Julie Bush (CEO), General Catalyst's Paul Kwan and Red Cell's Grant Verstandig. The team is sourced from Palantir Technologies, Anduril Industries and Helsing. The firm also holds strategic relationships with these companies. Valinor participates in Anduril's Lattice Partner Program, and the two companies are also members of the Defense Industrial Base Consortium. Stephens also sits on the board of Flexport (he led the Founders Fund's investment in the company). Stephens had initially worked for Palantir. Alex Karp, the CEO, told him that he would not let Stephens meet Thiel because he would be poached from Palantir. Karp managed to keep the two separated for two years, until 2012. Stephens began to work for the Founders Fund in 2013. The Founders Fund's $1 billion investment in Anduril's 2025 Series G is the fund's largest investment in history, and the $2.5 billion collected in total was the second largest sum invested in a defense company in 2025, only behind the aerospace company's $2.6 billion Series E.

Ryan Petersen of Flexport is a partner. In 2016, reacting to Peter Thiel's support for Trump, Petersen said that he regretted to have accepted investment from the Founders Fund. In 2023, he decided to join the fund though.

Delian Asparouhov is currently a partner. A Thiel fellow, he founded the space company Varda Space Industries together with former SpaceX engineer Will Bruey. Varda works on in-space manufacturing, especially in-space drug manufacturing, and also provides a testbed for hypersonic technology as well as "materials for heat shields, navigation systems and flight computers" for the U.S. Department of Defense. In 2025, they raised $187 million in funding. The founders emphasize that the technologies they use are not new, what is new is the innovative model that combines all elements together. In 2025, the startup carried out a Mach 25 plus mission together with the Air Force Research Laboratory (AFRL) and NASA's Ames Research Center. The Founders Fund is the incubator of the startup and one of its financial backers. In 2025, the Founders Fund invested $43 million in Asparouhov's home country Bulgaria's satellite startup EnduroSat.

Scott Nolan is a partner. In 2025 he co-founded General Matter, a new nuclear fuel startup which he co-founds and which is considered the third part of a trilogy incubated at the Founders Fund (following Palantir and Anduril). When at SpaceX, Nolan helped to develop the Merlin engine systems and the Dragon capsule. He stays as a partner but will give his full focus on General Matter and the companies he has previously backed.

Brian Singerman is a partner emeritus. He continues as strategic advisor and investor. He is seeking $500 million for a new fund named GPx.

Mike Solana is the chief marketing officer. He is the founder of Pirate Wires.

=== Former personnel ===
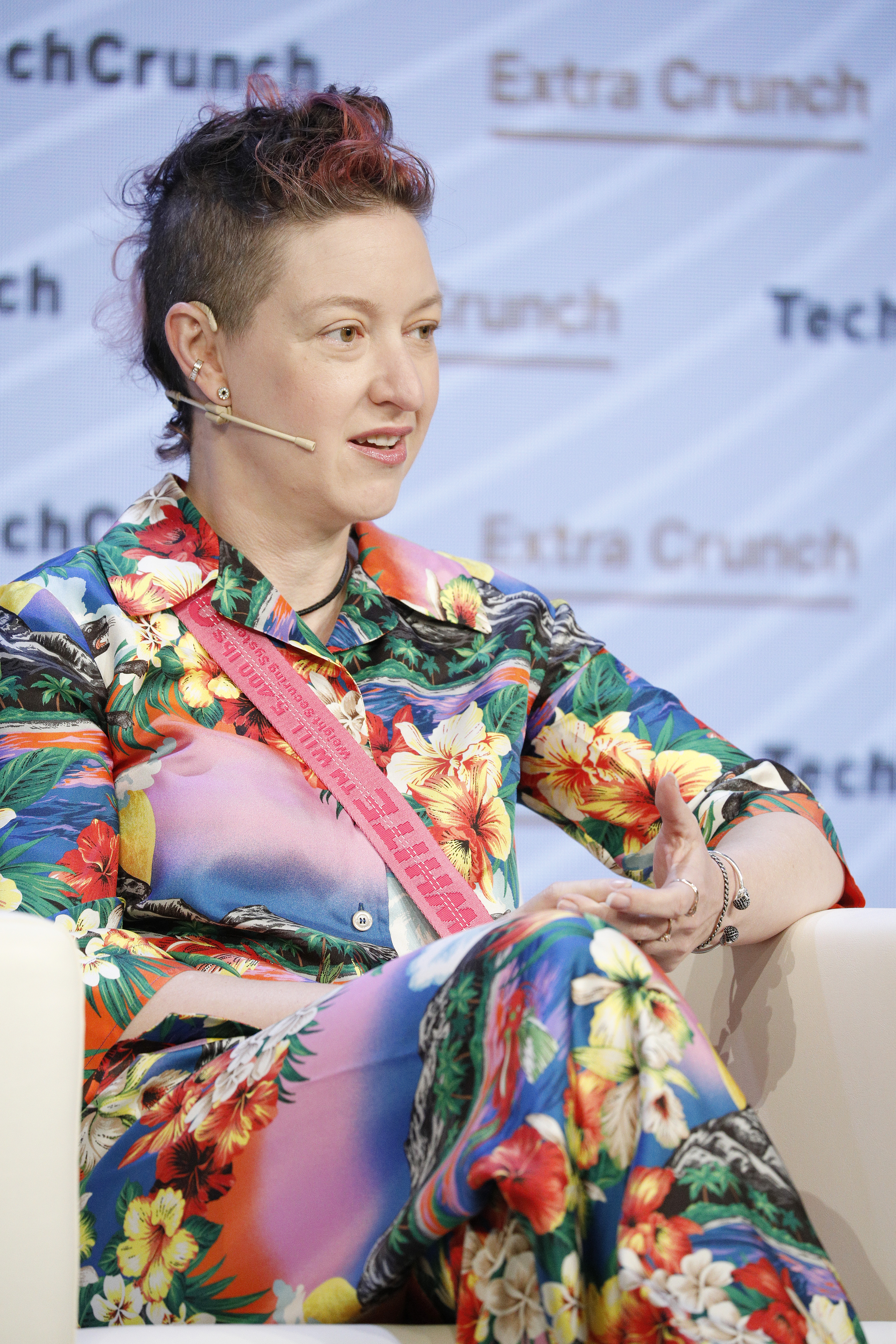
Cyan Banister at TechCrunch Disrupt San Francisco, 2019

Keith Rabois is another PayPal Mafia member. His connection with Thiel began when he served in The Stanford Review's staff under Thiel (When Howery joined Stanford, Thiel and Rabois had graduated). He left Khosla Ventures to join the Founders Fund in 2019. He returned to Khosla in 2024.

Bruce Gibney is also a former Stanford Review editor-in-chief. At Stanford, he was also Howery's roommate. He and his family were early investors in Confinity, which later formed PayPal. He worked for Thiel at Clarium Capital, where he advised Thiel on the $500,000 investment in Facebook. Later, he moved to the Founders Fund and worked as growth partner. He left in November 2012. He also works as a writer and litigator.

Sean Parker worked at the Founders Fund between 2006 and 2014. In 2010, when the Founders Fund invested in Spotify, he became a member of Spotify's board. He is also the founder of the Parker Foundation, an philanthropic organization.

In 2016, Bloomberg noted that Founders Fund added roughly one member to their investment team per year. Cyan Banister was the Founders Fund's first female investing partner. In 2019, she helped organize a protest in solidarity with Hong Kong protesters and urged Silicon Valley to sever the ties with China. She married PayPal Mafia member Scott Banister. Now she leads Long Journey Ventures alongside Arielle Zuckerberg, sister of Mark Zuckerberg. Long Journey is backed by Thiel, Andreessen, Rabois and others.

Tristan Abbey worked at Clarium Capital and the Founders Fund. He is currently the 11th administrator of the U.S. Energy Information Administration. He was an editor at The Stanford Review too.

Justin Fishner-Wolfson and S. Alexander Jacobson are former investors at Founders Fund. They are co-founders and partners at 137 Ventures (together with Kathy Chan, formerly at Khosla Ventures), which invests in Palantir, Anduril, SpaceX, Airbnb, Flexport.

== Investments ==
=== Defense, nuclear, space, quantum and dual-use technology (including AI for defense) ===
The Founders Fund have incubated or co-incubated Palantir Technologies, Anduril Industries, General Matter, Valinor, Varda Space Industries, which are all defense company; only Sol is a non-military company.

John Mac Ghlionn of the Boston Globe describes "Small Tech", which he defines as "a cluster of small Silicon Valley firms" that represents the "AI-driven military-industrial complex" with Palantir as "its public face", writing that, "The deeper roster runs through Anduril, Shield AI, Saronic, Scale AI, Vannevar Labs, Skydio, Epirus, and a dozen more startups bankrolled by the venture capital firm Founders Fund, Andreessen Horowitz, and Peter Thiel's wider network." Palantir itself is a relatively small company, with a small number of employees (around 4,000, which has barely increased through the years). The Economist notes that Palantir, Anduril, and SpaceX, sometimes dubbed "neo-primes", generally dislike "cost-plus" contracts where the government covers all expenses and adds profit, because that model, while necessary for large, complex programs with unpredictable initial costs, breeds laziness. Instead, the new defense leaders often prefer fixed-price deals in which they cover the initial cost of research and development and earn fat margins if they deliver on time and within budget: "The contract structure helps to keep them lean, and gives them an incentive to upgrade their products frequently, rather than building new weapons or systems from scratch each time."

Thiel combines the investments of different funds that he founds or invests in for activities in the defense sector. Intelligence Online notes that since the 2010s, he has gradually cornered the private satellite imagery market through multiple investments by his different funds (Y Combinator, Founders Fund, Mithril), then sold this essential service to governments in the U.S. and other countries as part of a global strategy. Via Mithril Capital, he invested in Spaceflight Industries (from which BlackSky was spun out) and helped it to acquire OpenWhere, which developed software to merging imagery data with data from other sources. Via Founders Fund, he invested in Planet Labs, which has acquired Alphabet's Terra Bella. Meanwhile, Palantir and Vicarious (backed by the Founders Fund) develop image and data processing technology, while Y Combinator, where Thiel once served as partner, supported Armada and Aptonomy, which developed totally automated observation drones.

Los Angeles Times notes that, to exert his control and influence over Palantir, he combines a multi-class share structure with equities held in the Founders Fund as well as other funds he invests in (some are indirect investments, like those made through 8VC and Disruptive Technology Solutions).

Other than the defense company that Founders Fund incubates and SpaceX, it makes investments in other notable companies or projects that have strategical value for defense, security or government affairs, including:

Miles Kruppa revealed that Founders Fund was sitting on a more than $19.5 billion gain from its investment in SpaceX since it started investing in 2008—more than its total assets under management! Peter Thiel, the firm’s founder, lives in Los Angeles. And Anduril CEO Brian Schimpf told Jessica Lessin on TITV last week that its revenue would double—but it wasn’t yet making money. "Growing a hardware company at the rate we’re growing at turns out to be really expensive," he said. There’s a fascinating business story here about the reinvention of both the tech industry and the national defense complex. But there’s also something broader in the air: realpolitik. Tech is getting built and funded with an eye toward serving national interests and, importantly, getting close to power. Ideals only take you so far.

— Cory Weinberg, The Information
- Impulse Space: After leaving SpaceX, engineer Tom Mueller founded the in-space transport startup following the advice of Peter Thiel. Founders Fund led its $150 million funding round in 2024. The fund also participated in the Series C (June 2025).
- Planet Labs: a space and analytics startup formerly known as Cosmogia. Founders Fund joined their Series B, C, D.
- Senra Systems: startup that makes wire harnesses for "sensors, avionics, communications systems and control surfaces", "aiming to accelerate American manufacturing of drones, rockets and more". The Founders Fund joined its Series A.
- Climate Corp: agrotech company that relies on space-based data. Brian Singerman was on the board. In 2013, it got acquired by Monsanto.
- Moon Express: Tokyo-based moon mining startup. The Founders Fund invested in its Series B (2017).
- Planetary Resources (defunct and acquired by Consensys in 2018): space mining startup. Matthew Johnson links the investment to Thiel's Hayekian economic thinking (Thiel was given the Hayek Lifetime Achievement award by the F.A. v Hayek Institut and the Austrian Economics Center in 2015).
- Northwood Space: startup that emerged from stealth mode in February 2024 and designs "satellite ground systems that receive data from satellites." Founders Fund is an early backer.
- Accion Systems: space propulsion startup that develops modular thrusters like the IRVINE01 and IRVINE02 thruster systems.
- Hextronics: dual-use drone automation hardware company. The Founders Fund led the seed round in 2024.
- Nominal: startup that develops "end-to-end data analysis solutions for industrial engineering teams" in manufacturing spacecraft, drones, satellites, and nuclear reactors. Founders Fund is an early backer.
- Niantic, Inc.: augmented reality software company, which has a partnership with BlackSky (Blacksky is a satellite company backed by Mithril Capital.). The Founders Fund joined its 2017 Series B and 2019 Series C. Previously, Scott and Cyan Banister had joined its Series A.
- Neros: military drone startup which is founded by Thiel Fellow Soren Monroe-Anderson. The company's supply chain eliminates Chinese components, resulting in it becoming "one of just two U.S. FPV drone makers approved by the Defense Innovation Unit" and being sanctioned by Beijing. It is backed by the Founders Fund and Thiel Capital. It allies with the German drone company Quantum-Systems (backed by Thiel through Thiel Capital), which makes the carrier drone Radiant, which can launch Neros's Archer.
- Hermeus: supersonic airliner startup. In 2019, the Founders Fund joined its $100 million Series B.
- Akash Systems: startup producing satellite parts like diamond-cooled servers or radios. Delian Asparouhov invested in the company since his time at Khosla Ventures.
- EnduroSat: Bulgarian startup that manufactures Gen-3 satellites at scale, which also incorporates Magdrive technology The Founders Fund led a €43 million investment in May 2025.
- Magdrive: UK-based startup focused on spacecraft propulsion. The Founders Fund led the pre-seed round and participated in the 2025 seed round.
- Shield AI: startup that works on autonomy for hardware and software. Palantir is a backer and strategic partner of the company.
- Ayar Labs: optical I/O data company that produces chiplets for the DoD. The Founders Fund (FF Science) led the seed round and participated in Series A, Series B, Series C.
- PsiQuantum: Photonic quantum startup that works with Australian and U.S. defense agencies. The Founders Fund led the Series B (2017) and participated in 2019 and 2020 funding rounds.
- Rigetti Computing: superconducting quantum startup that works with Air Force Research Laboratory. The Founders Fund led the 2020 funding round.
- Zapata AI: early quantum AI specialist (now ceased operation), veteran-owned "Non-Traditional Defense Contractor" (NTDS). The Founders Fund (FF Science) participated in its seed round in 2018.
- Valthos: biodefense company that emerged from stealth in October 2025, with backing from Lux Capital, OpenAi and the Founders Fund. Co-founders are Kathleen McMahon (CEO), who served a long time as leader of Palantir's life sciences division, and Lux Capital partner Tess van Stekelenburg. Delian Asparouhov notes that before 2025, creating biotech-based weapons was "only murmurs", but now technological advances have made it a real possibility. The team comes from Palantir, DeepMind, the Broad Institute and the Arc Institute. Vox sees the startup and its alliance with OpenAI as the beginning of AI-bio defense capabilities.
- Biosphere: a clean energy startup that develops UV-sterilized bioreactors and is working with the U.S. Department of Defense in benchtop production. The Founders Fund participated in the seed round.
- Bolt Threads: startup that makes dual-use synthetic spider silk. The Founders Fund joined Series B, C, D. It went public through merging with a SPAC in 2024.
- Sana Health: startup that develops a device to treat PTSD, adjustment disorder or pain and sleep problems. It is supported by the DoD. The Founders Fund participated in the seed round and led another funding round in 2020.
- Earable: Vietnamese-American sleeptech company, that won the 2023 CES Innovation Award and targets the defense sector. The Founders Fund led the seed round.
- Solugen: chemical startup "developing modular, scalable infrastructure to produce dual-use precursors for next-generation energetic materials." Solugen serves critical materials, defense, and energy. The Founders Fund led its Series A, Series B. Founders Fund partner Sean Liu was its CFO (before joining the Founders Fund), now remains strategic advisor.
- Transatomic Power: a startup that developed a molten salt reactor, before closing down in 2018.
- Radiant Industries: startup that made nuclear microreactors. Founders Fund joined its Series B, C.
- Avalanche Energy: fusion company that builds mini reactors, which have application in defense. The Founders Fund co-led its Series A in 2023.
- Voya: dual-use climate tech company, that develops a method to turn metal into energy. The Founders Fund participated in its 2025 seed round. The IQT (formerly In-Q-Tel) also invested.
- Crusoe (Crusoe Energy Systems): startup that builds computing and AI infrastructure (like modular datacenters) utilizing clean (mainly renewable) energy. The company is a close partner of OpenAI, Oracle and Softbank, as a member of the Stargate project. Founders Fund led its $600 million Series D in December 2024.
- Modumetal: dual-use startup that "grows" high performance metal in an energy-efficient and cheap way. The Founders Fund led the $33.5 million round in 2015.
- Biofire: startup that develops a smart gun, using biometric data to prevent children from using guns. The Founders Fund led the Series A, but few investors participated, so the Series A was extended in 2024, again with participation from the Founders Fund.
- Gecko Robotics: a startup "which uses robots and AI to help organizations including the U.S. military inspect and monitor critical infrastructure". It became a unicorn in June 2025. The Founders Fund supported it since its Series A, joined its Series B, C, D. Trae Stephens joined the board after Series C.
- Cobalt Robotics (later Cobalt AI): company that produces indoor security robots which serves the defense, manufacturing and finance sectors. The robots were deployed by the Australian government during the Covid pandemic. The Founders Fund joined the Series A, Later the company got acquired by Dean Drako.
- goTenna: startup that works on dual use technology like mesh networking over radio frequencies, that can be used for the military or rescue. The Founders Fund led its series C in 2019.
- Advanced Manufacturing Company of America (Amca): aerospace and defense company, that acts as a layer between startups and legacy players. It acquires old defense companies that make power units, sensors and flight-control computers to rebuild the supply chain for companies like Boeing and Airbus. The company launched in April 2025 with $76.5 million in initial funding. Backers include Founders Fund, Caffeinated Capital, Lux Capital, Andreessen Horowitz.
- Hadrian Automation: defense manufacturing company, which has a close connection with Anduril. The Founders Fund has invested in the company since its seed round. In July 2025, the Founders Fund co-led the $260 million Series C with Lux Capital.
- Layup Parts: composites manufacturing company, built by three The Boring Company alumni, originally built to support Anduril but now serving many companies in defense, aerospace and automotive industries. The Founders Fund led a funding round for it in May 2024 and participated in funding in 2026.
- Plethora: CNC manufacturing startup that turns 3D designs into custom parts (providing both software and hardware), serving customers in aerospace and defense. The Founders Fund has supported the company since the seed round (2013). Scott Nolan led the investment and is on the board.
- Armada AI: startup that makes moveable AI datacenters for manufacturing and defense. The Founders Fund has been backing the company since the beginning, In December 2023 when the startup emerged from stealth mode, the Founders Fund led its $55 million funding round. The fund backed it again in its $40 million fundraising round in 2024 and its $131 million round in 2025. Dan Wright, the CEO, said that, "The company itself came out of a number of discussions between myself, my co-founder Jon Runyan, and many of our investors and partners, like Founders Fund and 137 Ventures, as we looked for a company to build that would have a material, positive impact on the world."
- Dirac: defense manufacturing AI startup that helps to build jet engines and submarines. The seed round led by the Founders Fund and Coatue was announced together with a partnership with Siemens. It also has a partnership with Hadrian.
- Scale AI: data annotation startup, which allies closely with Palantir and Anduril as a new industrial player in the defense sector. Co-founder Lucy Guo is a Thiel Fellow. The startup became an unicorn after Founders Fund led the series C in 2019.
- OpenAI: Thiel was one of the first donors to the then non-profit OpenAI. The Founders Fund is a longtime backer. Recently, the Founders Fund joined the $8.3 billion funding round in August 2025. OpenAI is also a close ally of Palantir, Anduril and Valinor, which are challenging the traditional military incumbents.
- Anthropic: Founders Fund co-led its Series G.
- Databricks: In December 2024, the Founders Fund participated in its $10 billion funding round, investing "low hundreds of millions of dollars". Palantir and Databricks has a partnership, that merges Palantir's Ontology System with Databricks' data processing capabilities, serving entities such as the Department of Health and Human Services, the Department of Defense, and energy firm bp.
- Rescale: HPC cloud computing startup that works with the Defense Innovation Unit (DIU). It is known that Thiel is an early investor, who also invested in its Series D. Some sources report that the Founders Fund invested in the 2015 round.
- Lagrange Labs: blockchain cryptography startup (that has a partnership with Anduril). The Founders Fund led its seed funding round.
- Qadium (later renamed Expanse): cybersecurity that worked with the Department of Defense; co-founded by Shaun Maguire (Sequoia), Tim Junio (who previously served at the CIA and under the secretary of defense) and Matt Kraning (former DARPA employee). The Founders Fund and Peter Thiel personally led the $6 million seed round in 2015, then the Founders Fund joined Series A, B, C.
- CapLinked: project management software company founded by former PayPal's vice president Eric Jackson, which also works in cybersecurity with Google and other defense and government contractors. The Founders Fund (FF Angel) joined Series A,
- Galvanick: cybersecurity company that works with the government in defense sector. The company has defense-focused partnerships with Oracle. The Founders Fund participated in the seed round.
- Vicarious Systems: startup that worked on general intelligence for robots, now has been acquired by Alphabet. The Founders Fund was one of its earliest backers.

=== Robotics and civilian drones ===
Robotics is natural dual-use technology, but companies listed here have focused on civilian applications.

- Physical Intelligence Inc.: San Francisco-based robotics startup, also backed by Open AI.
- Built Robotics: autonomous construction vehicle startup. The Founders Fund participated in its Series A, B, C.
- Manna Drone: Irish delivery drone startup, founded in 2019, considered one of the most successful and largest drone delivery companies in the world. The Founders Fund is an early backer.
- Shinkei Systems: robotics startup that develops its technology based on the Japanese ike-jime method to harvest fish more efficiently and humanely. The Founders Fund led its Series A.
- Coco: last mile delivery robotics company, which is considered one of the leading startups in urban robotic delivery and has a partnership with OpenAI. The Series A was co-led by the Founders Fund, Sam Altman and Silicon Valley Bank.

=== Semiconductor ===
- Nanotronics Imaging: startup that builds builds modular semiconductor factories called "Cubefabs". The Founders Fund was the sole backer in its Series B (2013) and participated in Series D (2017). Thiel joined the board after Series B.
- Rex Computing: startup that worked on a new chip architecture and memory system. It was founded by Thomas Sohmers, a Thiel Fellow. The Founders Fund backed its seed round. The startup later became inactive. The founder has co-founded and is working as the CTO for the semiconductor startup Positron AI.
- Substrate: founded by James Proud, the startup develops X-ray lithography (instead of the EUV method) for chip production. In October 2025, Substrate received $100 million in funding from the Founders Fund, General Catalyst and others, which valued the firm at $1 billion. According to 2024 reports, the facility it intended to build in Texas would ultimately cost $10 billion.

=== Biotech and healthcare (including brain-computer interface) ===
- Ultima Genomics: gene-sequencing startup that came out of stealth mode in 2022 after raising $600 million from the Founders Fund, Andreessen Horowitz, Khosla Ventures and others.
- Nucleus Genomics: controversial startup that uses DNA found in saliva to a database linking health problems to genes and provide data for embryo selection, founded by Thiel Fellow Kian Sandeghi. Asparouhov led the Series A for Founders Fund.
- Stemcentrx (cancer therapies startup): Founders Fund led the company's Series B round, which "reportedly returned $1.4 billion off a $300 million investment".
- Datavant and Roivant Sciences: Roivant is a drug development company founded by Vivek Ramaswamy. Datavant is a healthcare data startup spun out from Roivant, with early backing from the Founders Fund. The Founders Fund also backs Roivant.
- Practice Fusion: startup that develops digitalized healthcare service. It has acquired Ringadoc which was backed by the Founders Fund too.
- Neuralink: Information about the startup's early funding is scarce (possibly Musk's own money). Founders Fund led a $280 million funding round (Series D) in 2023. It later participated in the $650M Series E (June 2025). Thiel also backs Neuralink's rival Blackrock Neurotech.
- CTRL-labs: a company that developed a wrist-worn, non-invasive brain–machine interface reads neural signals from the arm and hand to interpret a user's intended movements. By detecting intention rather than requiring actual motion, it enables people to control computers and other devices without physical action. It was acquired by Facebook in 2019.
- Halcyon Molecular: DNA sequencing startup co-founded by Nosek.

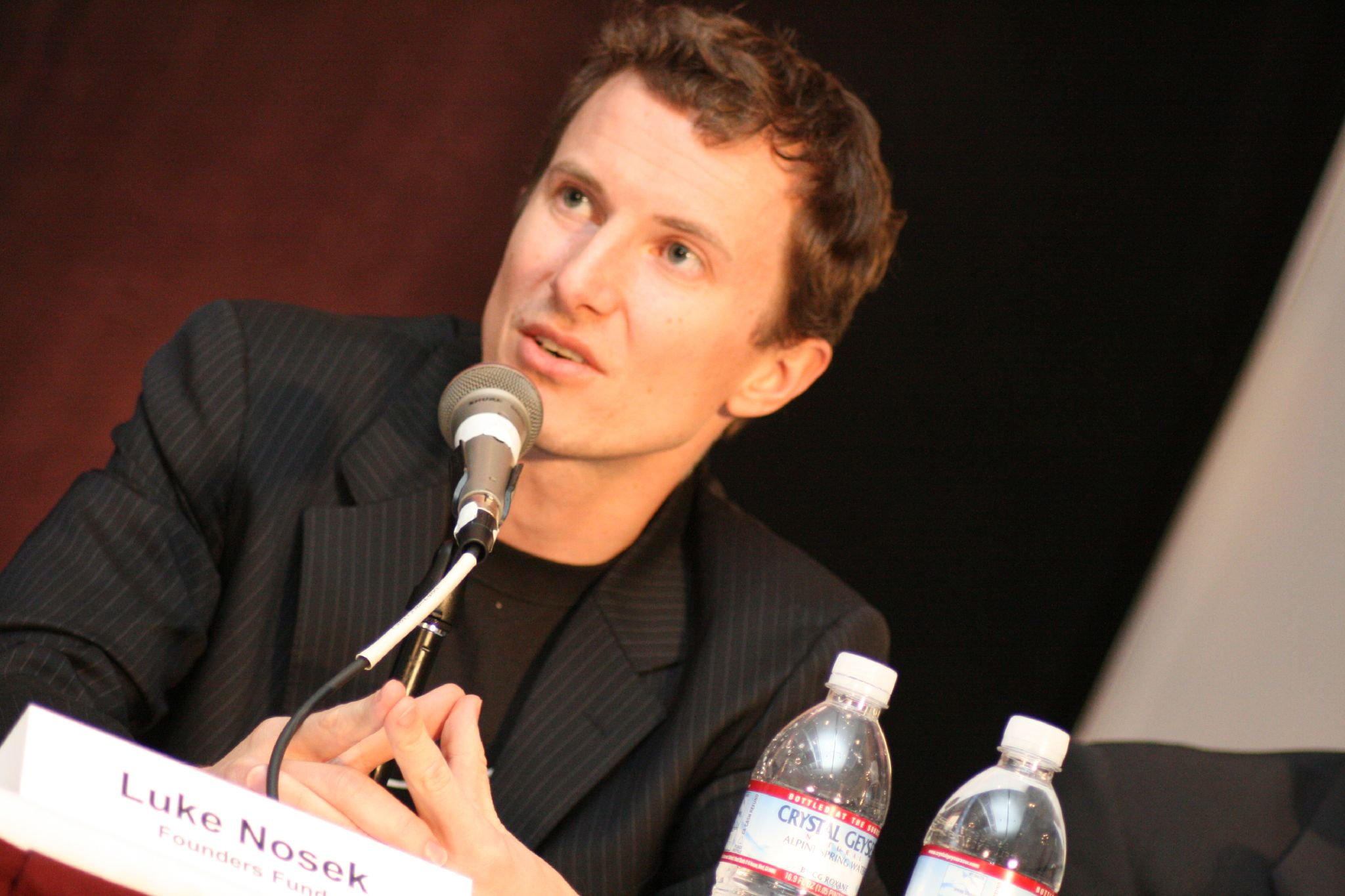
Luke Nosek, co-founder, 2007

- GoodRx: startup that does price comparison for prescription drugs. Founders Fund joined the seed round in 2011.
- Rational Vaccines: herpes vaccine company that carried out secret trials in Saint Kitts. Thiel Capital and the Founders Fund backed the company. The company was co-led by filmmaker Agustín Fernández and Bill Halford, professor at Southern Illinois University, who at the time had a fatal illness and felt that he could not wait for the government's approval. The company was criticized for violating ethical norms and FDA's rules, such as using a live virus (weakened). Supporters said that the 17 people injected with the vaccine already had herpes so risks were minimal; the current rules and processes were too burdensome so companies had to search for ways to speed up the development of drugs. The State Journal Register said that the affair led to development of proposals that could change the current drug-development system drastically including making new treatments accessible as much as seven years earlier. Jim O'Neill, who worked for Clarium and Mithril Capital before becoming the 25th United States Deputy Secretary of Health and Human Services, was an advisor for the company.
- NewLimit: epigenetic reprogramming startup. The Founders Fund co-led Series A with Dimension and Kleiner Perkins.
- HistoSonics: The Founders Fund and Thiel Bio invested and joined its ownership group (including K5 Global, Bezos Expeditions, and Wellington Management) in October 2025. The startup develops "a noninvasive therapy that uses histotripsy — therapeutic focused ultrasound energy — to liquefy and destroy tumors and tissue under real-time image guidance".
- Peptilogics: startup that develops the drug "zaloganan", which targets prosthetic joint infections (PJI). The Founders Fund led the October 2025 funding round alongside Thiel's new biotech fund Thiel Bio and Presight Capital. The press release said that Thiel had personally invested in the firm. previously.
- Hims & Hers Health: direct-to-consumer healthcare startup, that initially focused on men's health but now also has a female brand. The Founders Fund joined the $100 million round in 2019, which made it an unicorn.
- Zocdoc: telemedicine startup. The Founders Fund led Series B (2010), participated in Series D (2015).
- Contraline: startup that develops a non-surgical, reversible contraceptive for men, called ADAM. The Founders Fund led the second seed round (2017) and participated in Series A (2021).

=== Other hardware ===
- Freeform: metal 3d printing startup. The Founders Fund backed it in 2023.
- Zinier: field service automation platform startup. Founders Fund invested in the company in 2019 and 2020.
- The Boring Company: The Founders Fund joined its $675 million Series C in 2022.
- Tibber: Norwegian digital clean energy startup that is also active in Germany, Sweden and the Netherlands. The Founders Fund led its Series A, co-led its Series B with Accel and participated in Series C.
- Stenon: Potsdam-based portable soil sensing agrotechnology startup. The Founders Fund funded its Series A.
- Oculus: augmented reality hardware and software startup founded by Palmer Luckey, later acquired by Meta.
- Zellerfeld: Hamburg- and New York-based startup that produces 3d-printed shoes. The Founders Fund led its seed round (2023).
- Flock Safety: Surveillance hardware company that works with local law enforcement.
- The Ocean Cleanup: Dutch NGO that develops systems to remove plastic pollution from the oceans, developed by Thiel Fellow Boyan Slat and Charles-Eric Gascon.

=== Fintech, insurance, trade, marketing, consumer tech and cryptocurrency ===
- Affirm: founded by PayPal co-founder Max Levchin: Founders Fund did not invest until 2016, but led its $US100 million Series D and participated in the $500 million Series G and the $200 million Series E.
- Nubank: Brazilian banking startup. The Founders Fund led the Series C (this was also its first foray into Brazilian investment scene, even though Thiel's other funds had made investments in Brazil before) and participated in Series D.
- Polymarket: cryptocurrency-based prediction market startup. The startup became an unicorn in June 2025 after Founders Fund led a $200 million funding round.
- Ramp: a fintech company founded in 2019. The Founders Fund has led five rounds of investment, which helps the company to reach a value of $16 billion. The company attracted controversies in 2025 due to its political connections, when the General Services Administration considered it for the government's SmartPay program.
- Long-Term Stock Exchange: The Founders Fund led its Series B.
- Zenreach (formerly Adentro): The Founders Fund led its Series B and participated in Series C. Peter Thiel joined its board after Series B.
- Oscar Health: health insurance company founded by Joshua Kushner, Mario Schlosser and Kevin Nazemi. The Founders Fund participated in its Series A. In 2015, when it attracted $145 million, the Wall Street Journal reported that, "Return investors Peter Thiel and Brian Singerman of Founders Fund led the round."
- Airbnb: hospitality startup, in which the Founders Fund first invested in 2013 (Series C). Mithril Capital locked the deal down first, but they boasted about the deal early with investors. Rumours reached the Founders Fund, which already disliked Mithril for being too close to their Presidio campus. The Founders Fund claimed that because Thiel was already a backer, it would be more natural for the Founders Fund to get the deal. The Founders Fund ultimately prevailed, while Thiel arranged for Mithril to invest in Palantir as compensation.
- Spotify: The Founders Fund first invested in the startup in 2010 (as a lead investor; Series C). Sean Parker joined its board in that year and has remained a board member until this day. The Founders Fund continued to invested in 2015.
- Credit Karma: multinational personal finance company. The Founders Fund invested in its Series A in 2009,
- Trade Republic: Berlin-based fintech and banking startup. The Founders Fund co-led Series B with Accel, participated in Series B extension and Series C. In 2021, the Handelsblatt notes that while Thiel invested extensively in German fintech startups (at this time his German investments consisted mostly of fintech and software) through different funds (but mostly Thiel Capital and Valar), he did not advise them equally. While the Berlin-based banking startup Moss's founders only saw from Valar Ventures's James Fitzgerald, Thiel paid special attention to Trade Republic.
- Brave Software: Creators of the Brave Browser, an open-source ad-blocking browser based on Firefox

=== Database and social networking ===
- ResearchGate: The Founders Fund is an early investor in the Berlin-based science database and networking site. Virologist Ijad Madisch, the founder, recounts that, in 2012, Thiel arrived late, asked three questions, and then stood up, saying: "I want to invest in this guy no matter what the cost."
- The Org: Database startup that builds organizational charts. The Founders Fund participated Series A (2000; as lead according to TechCrunch and tech.eu, as non-lead investor according to Business Insider), Series B (2021).

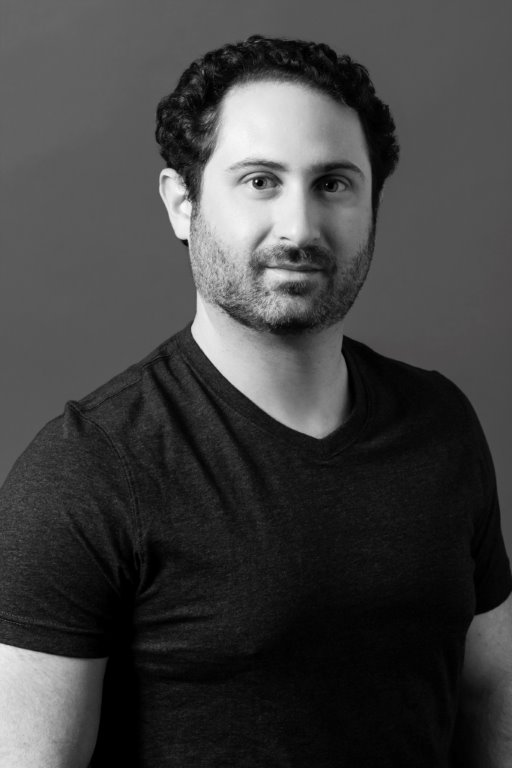
Brian Singerman, 2013

=== Cloud computing ===
- Domo, Inc.: AI, business intelligence company.
- Hydra Host: company that provides bare metal GPU cloud services. The Founders Fund's Trae Stephens led the $8 million seed round. Joe Lonsdale also participated.
- BuildOps: startup that develops an all-in-one cloud platform for companies in contractors in plumbing, HVAC, and electrical trades. Founders Fund joined Series A.

=== Digitalization, artificial intelligence and cybersecurity ===
- DeepMind: The Founders Fund was an early backer of the AI company, which later got acquired by Google.
- Arceo.ai (or Arceo Labs, later renamed as Resilience Cyber Insurance Solutions or Resilience): enterprise cybersecurity risk-analytics startup, which develops methods to prevent theft of usernames and passwords through multifactor authentication for private businesses. The startup is founded by Defense Innovation Unit's former leaders Raj Shah and Vishaal Hariprasad. Its $37 million funding round in 2019 was led by Founders Fund and Lightspeed Venture Partners. This was the Founders Fund's first investment in cybersecurity. In 2023, the Founders Fund participated in its $100 million Series D.
- Figma: Founders Fund participated in its Series D. Figma's Dylan Field is a Thiel Fellow.
- Cognition AI: AI lab startup, that creates Devin AI. The Founders Fund led its $21 million Series A round in March 2024 and one month later, led a $175 million funding round. Thiel Fellow Walden Yan is a co-founder.
- Netic: automation platform startup that serves emergency service, home services, automotive and healthcare. In November 2025, when the Founders Fund led its $23 million Series B, Bloomberg commented that this was a rare case in which the Founders Fund provided early capital for a startup for the third time in a row (Founders Fubnd also led Netic's Series A). Previously this only happened to Anduril and Cognition.
- Enter: Brazilian legal AI startup. By September 2025, the Wall Street Journal notes that this is Founders Fund's only bet on a legal AI company to date. It co-led the Series A with Sequoia.
- DoNotPay: startup that produces "world’s first robot lawyer", founded by Thiel Fellow Joshua Browder. The Founders Fund participated in its 2019 seed round and the 2020 Series A.
- Asana, Inc.: work management platform. The Founders Fund has backed the company since 2012.
- Persona: identity verification service company. The fund led a $150 million funding round for the company in 2021.
- BillGuard: cybersecurity service company, that Khosla Ventures and Eric Schmidt's Innovation Endeavors, Joe Lonsdale and others also invest in.
- Circles.Life: Singapore-based mobile network operator. The Founders Fund backed it with an undisclosed sum in 2019.
- Prime Intellect: startup that builds a decentralized platform for AI development that lets users pool global computing resources to collaboratively train and collectively own AI models. Founders Fund led the $15m Series A in 2025.
- Moat: ad-tech company, that later became part of Oracle Advertising. The Founders Fund participated in the seed round and Series B.

=== Games and graphics ===
In 2019, Cyan Banister commented on the reason she and the Founders Fund continued to invest in game companies: "In 2018 I was obsessed with the idea of how you can bring AI and entertainment together [...] I also became obsessed with live and interactive mobile-first entertainment, making investments in HQ Trivia, Drivetime, Bunch and Glamcam. When anyone says that consumer is over, I disagree. I believe we are on the cusp of a paradigm shift of how consumers behave and it's the beginning of new social fabric and design that pushes devices in ways never before thought imaginable."

- Wonder Dynamics: VFX and computer graphics software startup. The Founders Fund led the seed round (2021; Cyan Banister also participated personally), participated in Series A (2023).
- Portalarium (now defunct): game company. The Founders Fund (FF Angel) co-led the seed round with m8 (2011), participated in Series A (2012).
- Mobalytics: Ukrainian gaming analytics startup. The Founders Fund participated in the seed round.
- Bonfire Studios: video game development studio. The Founders Fund invested in the company in early 2025.
- Cloud9: esports company. The Founders Fund invested in the 2017 Series A. David Sacks also participated. Brian Singerman had invested earlier in the seed round.
- Jam City: video game developer. The Founders Fund co-led its Series A with Greylock Partners, when its name was Social Gaming Network.
- Bunch Games: The Founders Fund participated in the seed round in 2018.

=== Edtech ===
- Altschool (later rebranded Altitude Learning): personalized learning, microschool startup. The Founders led or co-led Series A, Series B, participated in Series C.
- Knewton: adaptive learning startup. The Founders Fund participated in the $25M funding round in 2018 and led Series D (2011), participated in Series E (2013), Series F (2015).

=== Food and beverage ===
- Bev: women-centric beverage supplier that produced canned wine. It was founded by Alix Peabody and was later acquired by Gallo. The Founders Fund seeded the company in 2019.
- Eat Just: "first government-approved vendor of lab-grown chicken", that produces egg replacement products and lab-grown meat. The Founders Fund seeded the company together with Khosla.
- Eating with the chefs: Berlin-based delivery service that provides ingredients to prepare at home. This is one of Thiel's early non-fintech investments in Germany (seed round, 2015). The founder is Clemens Riedl, former CEO of StudiVZ (Berlin-based social networking platform for student, backed by Thiel). StudiVZ was acquired by Holtzbrinck, which also seeded Eating with the chefs together with the Founders Fund.
- Wild Earth: vegan high-protein pet food startup. Thiel Capital invests alongside the Founders Fund.

=== Incubators, accelerators and funds ===
- Entrepreneurs First: London-based talent investor service for the tech sector. The Founders Fund participated in its Series A.
- Coral Capital: Japanese venture capital firm that is backed by domestic, including Mizuho Bank, Mitsubishi Estate, Shinsei Bank, Dai-ichi Life, and Gree Inc., and overseas investors including the Founders Fund and the Singaporean Pavilion Capital. The Founders Fund was one of its first LPs. In 2021, the Founders Fund backed its third fund, which focused on early stage startups.
- Revolution Ventures: an affiliate of the Founders Fund.
- Narya Capital: an affiliate of the Founders Fund.
- Polychain Capital: blockchain-focused fund (backed together with Sequoia, Andreessen Horowitz and Union Square Ventures).
- Metastable Capital: hedge fund which invests exclusively into cryptocurrencies (backed together with Andreessen Horowitz, Sequoia, Union Square Ventures, and Bessemer Venture Partners).

=== Secret investments ===
- Boldend: San Diego-based cyberwarfare company, which competed with the Israeli NSO group's Pegasus for contracts with U.S.military and intelligence agencies. The startup reportedly received secret funding from the Founders Fund. The information was revealed when the slides Boldend sent to its partner Raytheon were obtained by The New York Times, in which Boldend claimed that its tools could hack Meta-owned WhatsApp and the Founders Fund was a major backer of the company. In 2022, Forbes was able to confirm with two different sources that $10 million was injected by the Founders Fund in the early days of the startup. This investment caused debates, especially because Thiel sat on Meta's board. The New York Times noted that another investment of Thiel (and the Founders Fund) that clashed with his seat at Meta's board, was Clearview AI, which collected billions of photos from Facebook, Instagram, and other social platforms in violation of their terms of service. Meta declined to comment on these investments.

== See also ==
- Palantir Technologies
- Anduril Industries
- SpaceX
- Varda Space Industries
- General Matter
