= Cyan Banister =

American investor and entrepreneur

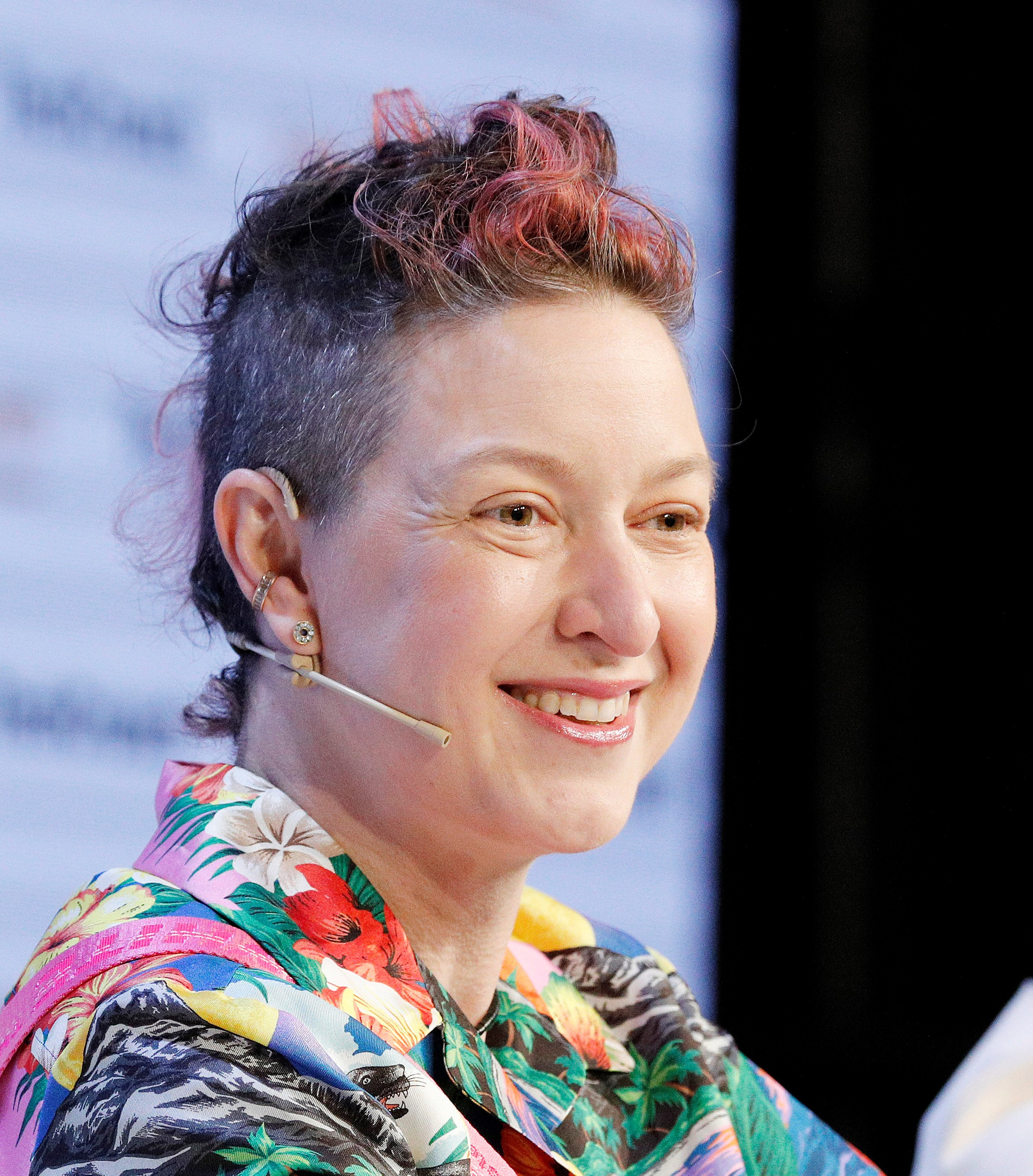
- Banister in 2019
- Born: Cyan Callihan; 1977 (age 48–49); Tucson, Arizona, US
- Occupations: Entrepreneur, Investor
- Known for: Angel investing
- Spouse: Scott Banister
- Website: cyanbanister.com

Cyan Banister (née Callihan; born 1977) is an American angel investor and entrepreneur. She is a partner at Long Journey Ventures, an early stage venture capital fund. She was an early investor in Uber, Niantic, Postmates, DeepMind, Carta, Thumbtack, Flexport, Affirm, and SpaceX, and co-founded Zivity, an adult-themed social networking site. Banister was the first woman investing partner at the venture capital Founders Fund, where she led seed and early-stage investments.

== Early life and education ==
Banister grew up in Arizona. At the age of 15 she experienced homelessness and dropped out of high school. Banister spoke publicly about her early life at the 2018 TechCrunch Disrupt conference, from living on the streets to becoming a venture capitalist, crediting her success to incrementalism, capitalism, individualism, mentorship, and endless curiosity. She credited being obsessed with making more money through capitalism as being what eventually saved her life.

== Career ==
Banister started her career in non-executive positions at NBCUniversal, where she worked in systems administration and development support from 1999 to 2001. She was a contributing writer to TechCrunch. She worked at the security startup IronPort from 2003–2006.

A self-taught engineer, Banister held management roles at IronPort. Ironport was sold to Cisco for $850 million in 2007. According to The Wall Street Journal, she found herself with money from the acquisition that she didn't know what to do with. She considered putting it in the stock market or in land, but settled on startups. The first check she wrote as an angel investor was to SpaceX." Banister invested early in several companies worth more than a billion dollars, including Uber, Affirm, Opendoor, and Postmates.

In 2007, Banister co-founded Zivity, a subscription platform for user-submitted photography, and led the company as its chief executive officer. She also appeared as a model on the site. She served as editor-in-chief until March 2016, when she became the first woman partner at Founders Fund, a Silicon Valley venture capital fund. At Founders Fund, Banister invested in companies like Niantic and HQ Trivia, and backed queer community app Yass through its FF Angel fund, the firm's vehicle for "inclusive and accessible" investments. She is also a co-founder of Thankroll.

Founders Fund partner Brian Singerman wrote, "Our team has known Cyan for years and we've been continually impressed by her ability to identify some of the most impactful technology companies in the world at the earliest stages." Polina Marinova of Fortune wrote, "It's difficult to describe Banister as she does not fit perfectly in any box..." Marinova added that Shrug Capital founder Niv Dror said, "She likes to invest in weird things, sees things super early and just gets it."

In March, 2020, Banister announced that she was leaving Founders Fund to join Long Journey Ventures to get back into angel investing. In March 2025, Banister and her partners at Long Journey Ventures, Arielle Zuckerberg and Lee Jacobs, closed their fourth early-stage fund, Long Journey IV, raising approximately $181.8 million to back what the firm calls "magically weird" founders.

== Personal life and political ideology ==
She lives with her husband Scott Banister in San Francisco. She identifies as a socially liberal libertarian, and came out in 2016 as genderqueer.

The day after Donald Trump in a presidential debate told the Proud Boys, a far-right group with a history of inciting violence, to "stand back and stand by," Banister tweeted that the group was misunderstood and had "a few bad apples who've claimed to be part of their org but in general not true."

In 2021, Banister had a Twitter account called "Recall Chesa Boudin" that argued the progressive District Attorney of San Francisco should be recalled. She donated $10,000 to a GoFundMe account started by Uber investor Jason Calacanis whose goal was to hire a researcher to investigate Boudin's office.

On August 23, 2021, interviewed on The Ingraham Angle by Laura Ingraham, Banister said, "More and more people are reaching out to me, wondering what it takes to own a firearm in San Francisco. And we don't have concealed carry permits, we don't have very good gun laws at all. And so we are allowed to defend our homes, but if we were to do that, if I were in a situation where I defended my home, what's going to happen to me?"

== Awards and honors ==
Cyan and Scott Banister won the Angel of the Year Crunchie award at the 2016 TechCrunch ceremonies. Jessi Hempel of Wired wrote that Banister is "an accomplished angel investor who, along with her husband, won TechCrunch's Angel of the Year award last spring for prescient bets on SpaceX, Uber, and DeepMind Technologies."

In 2015, Eugene Volokh announced that the UCLA First Amendment Amicus Brief Clinic would be renamed the Scott & Cyan Banister First Amendment Clinic, "in recognition of the Banisters' very generous gift in support of the clinic."

== See also ==
- List of venture capital firms
- Seed funding
- Venture capital financing
