= Cyrus Massoumi =

American entrepreneur

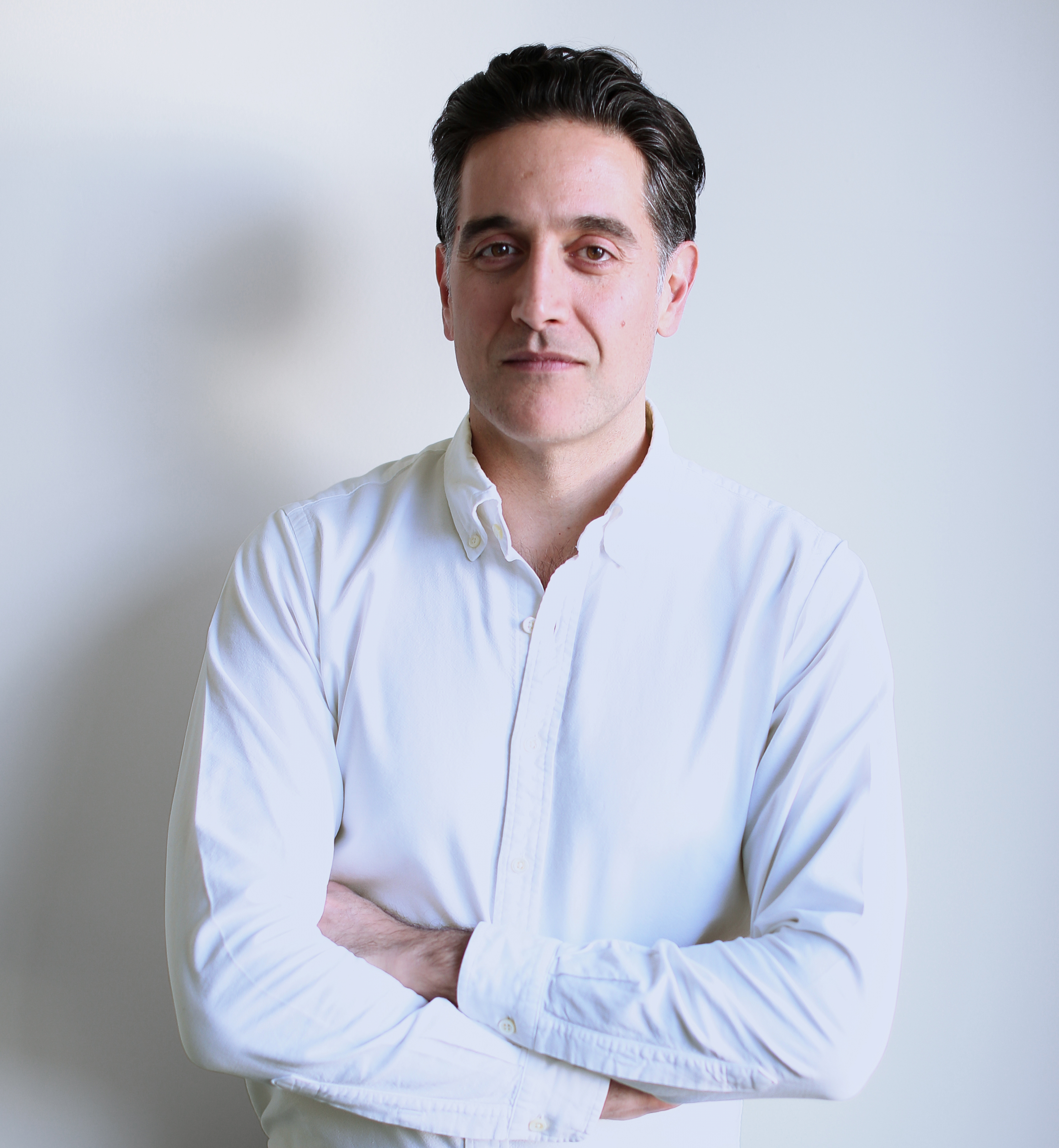
- Massoumi in 2000
- Born: 1976 or 1977 (age 49–50); United States
- Education: Phillips Academy, Wharton School at the University of Pennsylvania, Columbia University
- Occupation: Entrepreneur
- Known for: Founder of Zocdoc

Cyrus Massoumi (born 1976 or 1977) is an American entrepreneur who is the founder of telehealth service Dr. B and the founder of the investment fund humbition. He is also the founder of Zocdoc and was the company's CEO for eight years.

== Early life and education ==
Massoumi graduated high school at the Phillips Academy in the class of 1994. He then graduated with a BS Degree in Entrepreneurial Management, Finance and Operations and Information Management in 1998 from the Wharton School at the University of Pennsylvania. He also received an MBA with honors from Columbia University in 2003. Massoumi was a recipient of the Heffernan Award for Outstanding Service from Columbia University.

== Business career ==
=== Early years ===
While in college, Massoumi worked for Walt Disney Company and served as a staffer for a US Senator. In 1998, he joined the business development team of Trilogy Software where he shared a desk with future Zocdoc co-founder Nick Ganju. At the age of 22, he founded a software company called OneSizeTooSmall. The company closed in 2001, and Massoumi spent six months backpacking through China to figure out what he wanted to do next. After finishing Columbia Business School, he became an Engagement Manager at McKinsey & Company specializing in healthcare and technology.

=== Zocdoc ===
Massoumi founded Zocdoc together with Nick Ganju and Dr. Oliver Kharraz in 2007. Zocdoc is a New York-based online booking company that provides patients with the option of booking empty slots in doctors’ schedules using their mobile devices. Massoumi got the idea for the company after waiting four days with a ruptured eardrum to try to see a doctor. Their services reach 40% of the US population in 1900 cities. As CEO, Massoumi raised $220M. Some of their investors included: Amazon founder Jeff Bezos, Salesforce CEO Marc Benioff, Goldman Sachs, founder of SV Angel Ron Conway, Khosla Ventures, DST Global, Atomico and the Founders Fund among others. In August 2015, the company was valued at $1.8 billion. Zocdoc was recognized as a Best Place to Work both in New York and Arizona for four consecutive years. In November 2015, Massoumi stepped down as the company CEO and passed the job to fellow co-founder Oliver Kharraz. ZocDoc assisted cities in the rollout of the COVID-19 vaccine in 2021.

=== humbition ===
In 2018, Massoumi and Indiegogo founder Slava Rubin created humbition, a 30 million dollar fund that invests in New York startups. The fund's advisors include Neil Blumenthal, founder of Warby Parker; Payal Kadakia, founder of ClassPass; Scott Harrison, founder of Charity:Water; and Philip Krim, founder of Casper. The name 'humbition' was first used by Massoumi in 2013 during interviews with Fortune and CBS. He defined 'humbition' as "a quality in which people (leaders) are humble enough to put the team before themselves," but should also be ambitious and constantly working to improve.

=== Dr. B ===
In February 2021, Massoumi founded Dr. B, which at the time served as a “vaccine standby list” website to make unclaimed COVID-19 vaccines more accessible, especially for high-risk patients. Within 90 days of launching, Dr. B facilitated the delivery of over one million vaccine doses to patients. Since then, Dr. B has expanded its focus to offer convenient and affordable medical care for a variety of treatments, emphasizing equitable access to healthcare for all.

== Board memberships ==
Massoumi sits on the Board of Columbia University's Mailman School of Public Health. He also serves as an Advisor to Refinery29 and to ClassPass. He was previously an advisory board member of Harboring Hearts, a charitable organization that offers support to heart patients and their families.

== Recognition ==
In 2008, Massoumi won the Forbes Boost Your Business Award for Zocdoc. In 2012, Massoumi ranked at Number 57 in Fast Company's list of Most Creative People. In 2013, Massoumi was included in Columbia Business School's article entitled Eight Alumni Who Are Changing the World. He was also featured in Fortune's 40 Under 40 and in 2014, in Crain's 40 Under 40. In 2015, Massoumi was recognized in Business Insider’s Silicon Alley 100: 1-100 for being one of the “most inspiring people in the New York tech industry” and he was also named Healthcare Hero of the Year by the Palm Beach County Medical Society. In 2016, Massoumi was featured in Built in NYC's list of 20 Columbia alumni who founded major New York tech companies. That same year he also received Columbia Business School's Exemplary Leadership Award.
