= Howery =

Howery is a surname. Notable people with the surname include:

- Ken Howery (born 1975), American entrepreneur and diplomat
- Lil Rel Howery (born 1979), American actor and comedian
