= Azita Raji =

Iranian-born American diplomat (1961–2022)

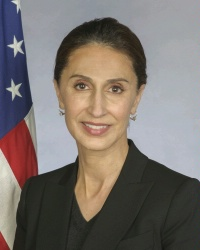

United States Ambassador to Sweden
- In office March 8, 2016 – January 20, 2017
- President: Barack Obama
- Preceded by: Mark Brzezinski
- Succeeded by: Ken Howery

Personal details
- Born: September 29, 1961 Tehran, Iran
- Died: February 6, 2022 (aged 60) Belvedere, California, U.S.
- Spouse: Gary Syman
- Children: 5
- Education: Barnard College (BA); Columbia University (MBA)

Azita Raji (Persian: آزیتا راجی, September 29, 1961 – February 6, 2022) was an Iranian-born American diplomat, banker, and philanthropist. She was nominated by President Barack Obama in October 2014 to serve as the United States ambassador to the Kingdom of Sweden, and confirmed unanimously by the United States Senate in February 2016. She presented her credentials to King Carl XVI Gustaf on March 15, 2016, and completed her tour of duty on January 20, 2017.

Ambassador Raji was nominated for the State Department's highest award for a non-career ambassador, the Sue M. Cobb Prize for Exemplary Diplomatic Service. She was the first female United States ambassador to Sweden, as well as the first Iranian-born American to serve as an ambassador of the United States.

== Early life ==
Born in Tehran, Iran, Raji completed her high school education in Lausanne, Switzerland, where she competed nationally as a downhill skier and chess player, before moving to the United States at the age of 17. She earned a Bachelor of Arts in 1983 in architecture and French from Barnard College, Columbia University, followed by a Master of Business Administration in 1991 in Finance from Columbia Business School. Raji became a U.S. citizen in 1988.

== Career ==
=== Financial and philanthropic ===
Raji was a Chartered Financial Analyst (C.F.A.) and was a member of the Institute for Chartered Financial Analysts since 1991. She was a member of the Bretton Woods Committee, an elite organization which supports international finance institutions such as the World Bank and the International Monetary Fund. Earlier in her career as an international investment banker, she held senior positions at firms including J.P. Morgan & Co., Salomon Brothers and Drexel Burnham Lambert.

Raji's past philanthropic activities have included numerous active leadership roles in the nonprofit sector: Trustee and member of the executive committee, Barnard College, Columbia University; Advisory Board, Columbia Business School Tamer Center for Social Enterprise; Founding Co-chair, Athena Center for Leadership Studies at Barnard College, Columbia University; Economic Advisory Council, Center for American Progress; Director, National Partnership for Women & Families.

=== Political ===
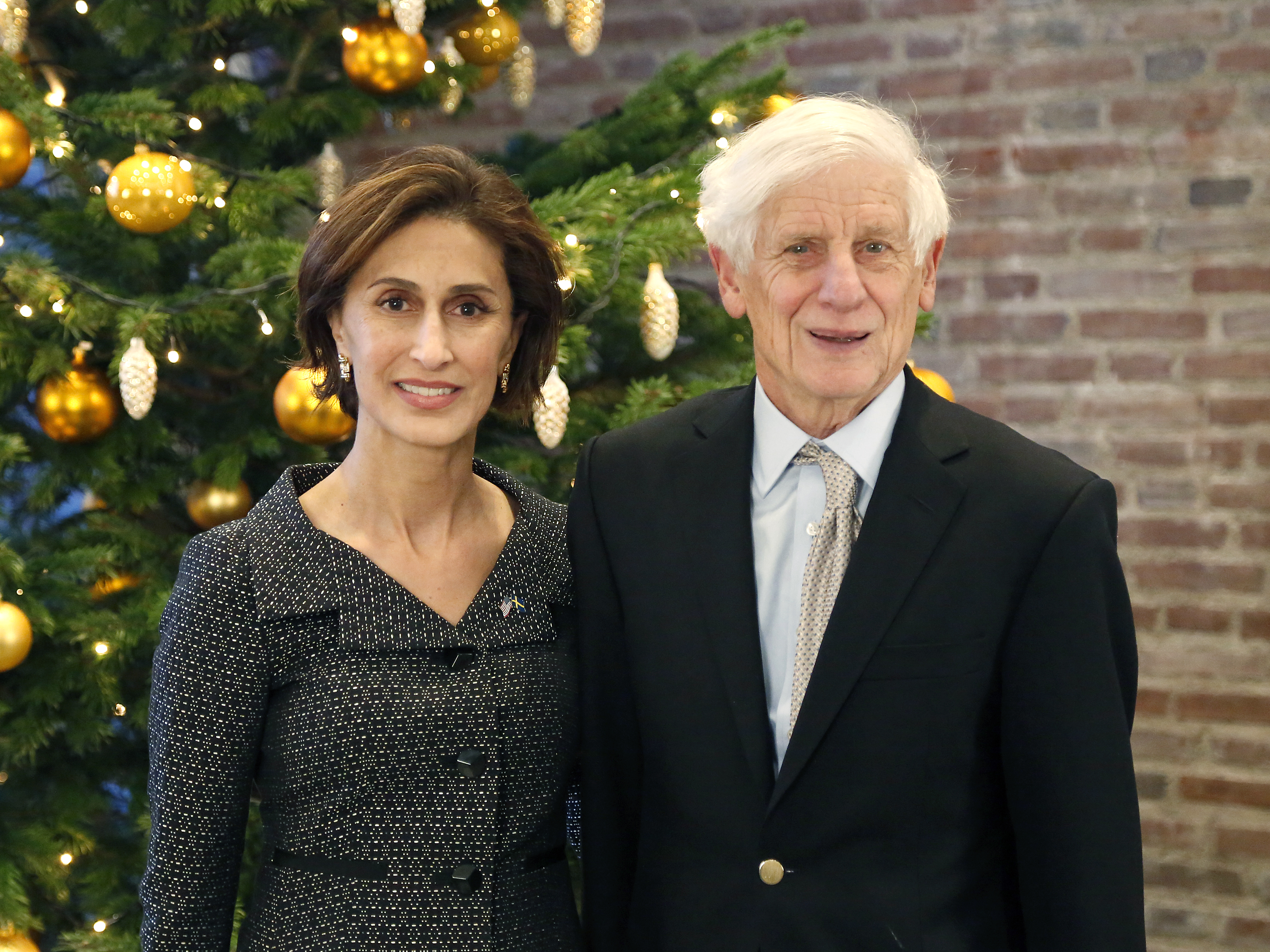
Raji with 2016 Nobel laureate David J. Thouless

By 2008, Raji had left the financial sector to focus on national politics. In 2012, she served as National Finance Vice-chair and Chair of Swing State Victory Fund for the Obama campaign. Raji was a national advisory board member of the Democratic National Committee and a member of the Obama for America National Finance Committee from 2008 to 2012. In 2013, President Obama appointed Raji to serve as a Commissioner on The President's Commission on White House Fellows. In addition, Raji was appointed a Commissioner of the Smithsonian National Portrait Gallery.

On July 4, 2016, Raji was recognized as an honoree of Great Immigrants: The Pride of America, the Carnegie Corporation of New York's annual recognition of inspiring naturalized U.S. citizens who have made notable contributions to the progress of American society.

On December 10, 2016, as the United States Ambassador to Sweden, Raji read Bob Dylan's letter to the Nobel Committee on his behalf during the Nobel banquet in Stockholm, in recognition of Dylan being awarded the 2016 Nobel Prize in Literature.

Raji was an honoree of the 2017 Ellis Island Medal of Honor and the Recipient of Barnard College's Joan Rivers Trailblazer Award 2020.

== Personal life ==
Raji lived and worked in the Middle East, Latin America, Europe, and the Far East and was fluent in several languages, including Persian and French. She was married to Gary Syman, a former partner of Goldman Sachs. They have five daughters and seven grandchildren.

Raji died on February 6, 2022, in Belvedere, California from metastatic breast cancer at the age of 60.

== Published articles ==
- Sense and Indispensability: American Leadership in an Age of Uncertainty - The Texas National Security Review, December 16, 2019
- The Partnership for Peace: A Quiet NATO Success Story - War on the Rocks, 4/8/19
- The Perils of Playing Footsie in Military Boots: Trident Juncture and Nato’s Nordic Front - War On The Rocks, 8/20/18
- Trump’s Tariffs and the Future of Transatlantic Ties - War on the Rocks, 6/5/18
- If the Transatlantic Relationship Sneezes, Will NATO Catch A Cold? - War on the Rocks, 5/21/18
- Salvaging Trump’s Legacy in Europe: Fixing NATO Burden-Sharing - War on the Rocks, 2/26/18
- Russia’s Cold War With Scandinavia - The Wall Street Journal, 8/28/17
- Trump Should Urge Europe to Resist Putin’s Pipeline Politics - Foreign Policy, 7/7/17
- Trump Is Overlooking an Obvious U.S. Partner - Foreign Policy, 5/15/17
- Trump Immigration Ban: Former U.S. Ambassador's Open Letter to Nikki Haley - Newsweek, 1/31/17
- Inclusion, Freedom, and Democracy Are Non-Negotiable Values - DN Debatt, January 21, 2017
- Upholding American Values Is My Job for Life - Newsweek, 1/20/17

Diplomatic posts
Preceded by Mark Brzezinski	United States Ambassador to Sweden; 2016–2017	Succeeded by David Lindwall; Acting
