= Zenreach =

American software company

Adentro
- Type: Private
- Industry: Technology
- Founded: 2012
- Headquarters: San Francisco, California, U.S.
- Area served: Worldwide
- Products: Wi-Fi marketing software
- Website: adentro.com

Adentro, formerly Zenreach is an American technology company based in San Francisco. It produces a marketing platform used by brick-and-mortar businesses that pairs with a business's guest Wi-Fi to enable visibility into in-store customer visit behavior. These details are used to create customer profiles, track subsequent visits, and deliver targeted ads. Zenreach rebranded as Adentro in 2021 in an effort to more directly represent their connection to in-store customers.

== History ==
Adentro was founded in 2012 in San Francisco, California. It was initially a part of the startup incubator, Atomic Labs. The company remained in stealth mode until July 2016. At that time, it was announced that it had raised $30 million in a series B round of funding led by Peter Thiels' Founders Fund. Thiel also joined the board as part of the deal. Prior to emerging from stealth, Adentro had raised $20 million in two funding rounds led by investors like Formation 8, Bain Capital Ventures, First Round Capital, SV Angel, and Felicis Ventures.

In March 2017, the company raised an additional $30 million in a series C round of funding led by Maverick Ventures and several previous investors. Actor Ashton Kutcher and NBA player Kevin Durant also contributed. In March 2018, Jack Abraham stepped down as CEO to become executive chairman.

== Description ==
Adentro produces a SaaS marketing platform used by businesses with physical locations. When customers at these businesses access their free public Wi-Fi, they are asked to provide an e-mail address or other form of contact information. Adentro uses that information to build a customer profile, track visit history, and deliver targeted ads. Adentro is headquartered in San Francisco with offices in Phoenix, Arizona and Waterloo, Ontario, Canada.
