= Brian Singerman =

American venture capitalist

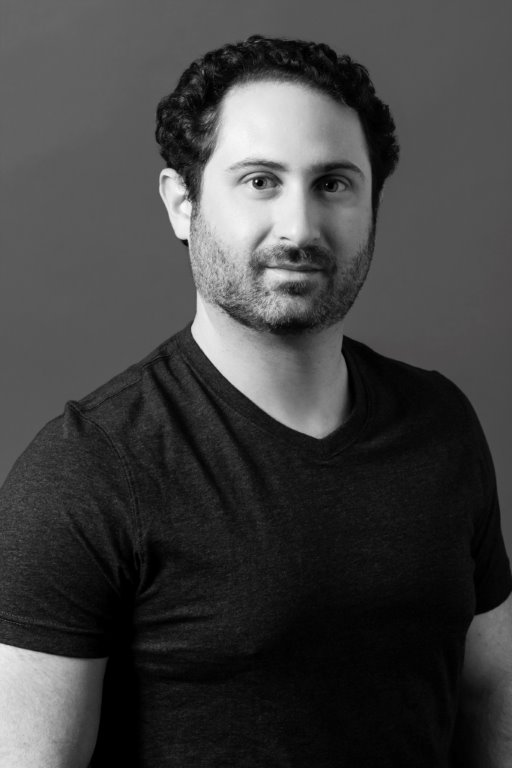
- Born: 1976 or 1977 (age 49–50)
- Education: Stanford University (BS)
- Occupation: Partner at Founders Fund
- Known for: Founder of iGoogle

Brian Singerman (born 1976 or 1977) is an American venture capitalist and businessman. He is a partner emeritus at Founders Fund, a San Francisco-based venture capital firm with over $11 billion under management.

== Early life and education ==
Singerman graduated from Stanford University in 1999 with a B.S. in Computer Science. Following Stanford, he joined the virtual-world online start-up There as a software engineer.

== Career ==
=== Google ===
In 2004, Singerman joined Google where he spent four years as an engineer and executive. At Google, he founded the personal web portal, iGoogle.

During his tenure at Google, Singerman began his investment career, launching a $1 million fund called XGYC Fund, short for "ex-Google, Y Combinator."

=== Founders Fund ===
In 2008, Singerman joined Founders Fund, where he works alongside Peter Thiel and Ken Howery. He focuses on healthcare, biotechnology, wearable computing, and robotics.

Singerman has been a board director for several companies, including Affirm, Cloud9, Emerald Therapeutics, The Long-Term Stock Exchange, Oscar Health, and Postmates. Additionally, he has served as a board observer for Airbnb, Forward, and Wish.

On December 3, 2024, Singerman announced his transition to the role of partner emeritus at Founders Fund, planning to continue as a strategic advisor while prioritizing a new work-life balance.

=== Notable investments ===
One of Singerman's most prominent investments was in Stemcentrx, a biotechnology firm focused on cancer therapies. In April 2016, AbbVie acquired Stemcentrx in a transaction valued at up to $10.2 billion, marking the largest portfolio exit in Founders Fund's history. However, in 2019, AbbVie shuttered Stemcentrx after its lead cancer drug, Rova-T, failed to outperform placebo in a Phase 3 clinical trial.

He has also been involved in investments in Oculus VR (acquired by Facebook) and Postmates (acquired by Uber).

== Personal life ==
Singerman resides in San Francisco, California.
