= Cofetuzumab pelidotin =

Experimental cancer drug

Monoclonal antibody
- Type: ?
- Source: Humanized (from mouse)
- Target: protein tyrosine kinase 7

Clinical data
- Other names: PF-06647020
- ATC code: none

Identifiers
- CAS Number: 1869937-48-3
- ChemSpider: none
- UNII: 249EAP69MT
- KEGG: D11118

Chemical and physical data
- Formula: C_{6774}H_{10418}N_{1778}O_{2096}S_{46}
- Molar mass: 151776.97 g·mol^{−1}

Cofetuzumab pelidotin (INN; development code PF-06647020) is an experimental antibody-drug conjugate in development for the treatment of cancer. It was created by Stemcentrx and is being developed by Pfizer. The drug is an anti-PTK7 monoclonal antibody linked to auristatin-0101, an auristatin microtubule inhibitor.

Antibody-drug conjugates use a monoclonal antibody that binds to tumors cells linked to a cytotoxic drug that then kills the cells. This allows the drug to selectively target the cells that the antibody binds to.

PTK7 is expressed by many tumors, including ovarian cancer, breast cancer, and non-small cell lung cancer. Early clinical trial results show a 50% response rate in patients with triple negative breast cancer and an almost complete response in ovarian tumors resistant to platinum-based chemotherapies.
