= Monomethyl auristatin =

Monomethyl auristatin is any of a group of synthetic antineoplastic agents derived from the sea slug Dolabella auricularia:

- Monomethyl auristatin E
- Monomethyl auristatin F
