= Zocdoc =

Medical care appointment booking service

Zocdoc, Inc.
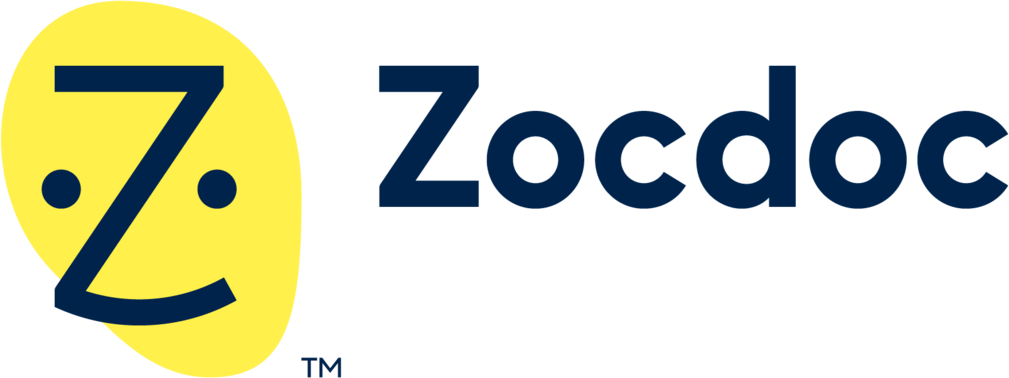
- Type: Private
- Industry: Telemedicine
- Founded: 2007; 19 years ago
- Founders: Cyrus Massoumi; Nick Ganju; Oliver Kharraz
- Headquarters: New York City, United States
- Area served: United States
- Key people: Oliver Kharraz (CEO)
- Services: Telehealth, Medical appointment booking platform
- Website: www.zocdoc.com

Zocdoc, Inc. is a New York City-based company offering an online service that allows people to find and book in-person or telemedicine appointments for medical or dental care. The platform also functions as a physician and dentist rating and comparison database. The service is free for patients, and doctors pay to advertise their appointment slots. Established in 2007, the private company had a $1.8 billion valuation by August 2015, the third-highest for a startup in New York at the time.

== History ==
=== Early history ===
Zocdoc was founded in New York City in 2007 by Oliver Kharraz, Nick Ganju, and Cyrus Massoumi, who served as the company's first CEO. Cofounders Kharraz and Massoumi met while working as consultants at McKinsey. Massoumi had experienced a burst eardrum while traveling and struggled to find available appointments of local doctors and that is where the idea for their business started. The service was launched during the TechCrunch40 conference (now called TechCrunch Disrupt) in September 2007. It began as a service for dentists in Manhattan, and expanded nationwide to include doctors in over 100 specialties.

In early 2008, the company received an initial round of $3 million in funding from Khosla Ventures. Amazon.com founder Jeff Bezos and Salesforce CEO Marc Benioff also invested in Zocdoc in 2008, helping the company expand the service into other cities and healthcare providers.

From 2011 to 2013 the company grew to be in over 30 cities, and by 2014, Zocdoc covered 40 percent of markets in 2,000 cities, and had five million users booking appointments every month.

Zocdoc was recognized as a Best Place to Work in both New York and Arizona for four consecutive years from 2010 to 2014.

=== 2015 to present ===
Additional rounds of funding in Zocdoc from Goldman Sachs, SV Angel founder Ron Conway, and the Founders Fund among others, resulted in a $1.8 billion valuation by August 2015 and a $2.3 billion valuation by 2026.

In November 2015, Massoumi was replaced by cofounder Oliver Kharraz as CEO, who was the COO since the company's launch.

By 2017, the company reported more than six million patients use Zocdoc every month, booking appointments throughout the United States.

In January 2019, the company announced it changed the pricing model from subscription to referral fee in some markets. Some doctors expressed concern that a per customer fee would be harder to recoup unless patients return for additional visits. Zocdoc said the change resulted in a 50 percent increase in the number of providers on its platform in states that have transitioned to the new payment model, and the company reported its revenue had increased after growing 35 percent year-over-year in 2019. During the COVID-19 pandemic, Zocdoc expanded into telehealth so that doctors on its platform could connect with patients over video.

In a lawsuit filed against Nick Ganju, Oliver Kharraz and Netta Samroengraja in 2020, Massoumi alleged that they perpetrated "an elaborate series of lies and deceptions" to steal control of the company from him. In 2021, the case was dismissed, but the dismissal was reversed on appeal in 2022, before being dismissed with prejudice in July 2024.

== Service ==
Zocdoc provides a scheduling system on a paid subscription basis for medical personnel. The scheduling system can be accessed by subscribers both as an online service and via the deployed office calendar software, or integrated with their websites. As of 2026, providers pay Zocdoc a fee for each new patient booked on its service. Users can go to Zocdoc to search using a symptom, specialty, visit reason, or doctor's name, along with their location and insurance information to view available appointment slots. They can then narrow the search by reviewing office locations, photographs, personnel information, educational background, and user-submitted reviews. In late 2012, the company added a check-in feature, allowing patients to fill out medical forms online ahead of time.

For each doctor listed, the users are able to see the free slots in the schedule and make appointments for specific times, for either in-person or telemedicine appointments. In May 2020, Zocdoc launched its telehealth service.In 2024, Zocdoc launched advanced partner program for EHRs and PM vendors. In May 2025, Zocdoc released a voice-based artificial intelligence assistant that answers appointment-scheduling phone calls.

=== COVID-19 ===
In 2020, Zocdoc built a pilot program for scheduling COVID vaccination appointments with Mount Sinai Hospital in New York. The Zocdoc Vaccine Scheduler is free and is integrated into an organization's website to screen patients and book appointments. Since its launch, the Zocdoc-run Mount Sinai scheduler had booked over 100,000 appointments, booking 100 appointments per minute at its peak in the early days of the vaccine rollout. Zocdoc also partnered with the city of Chicago to help the city's residents find and book vaccine appointments in a central spot. There is also a vaccination scheduling service on the company's site for additional cities and states such as Alabama, Illinois, Kansas, and Massachusetts, where people can see if they are eligible for vaccination, find out where they can get vaccinated, book an appointment and book their second shot at the same time.

== Partnerships ==
In June 2025, Zocdoc partnered with Blue Shield of California, integrating its scheduling technology into the insurer's member portal.

In December 2025, Zocdoc partnered with Healthgrades to add real-time appointment booking to Healthgrades' provider search.

In April 2026, Zocdoc partnered with Yelp to add real-time appointment booking to Yelp's iOS app and its Yelp Assistant chatbot.

In August 2026, Zocdoc partnered with Google to let users search for and book healthcare providers directly within the Gemini app.

In September 2026, Zocdoc launched the Care Access Network, an enterprise platform that lets partners, including Amazon Health AI, Google Gemini, Yelp, Healthgrades, Blue Shield of California, and the Veterans Health Administration (through WellHive), embed Zocdoc's real-time appointment-booking infrastructure directly into their own platforms.
