= Ken Howery =

American entrepreneur and diplomat (born 1975)

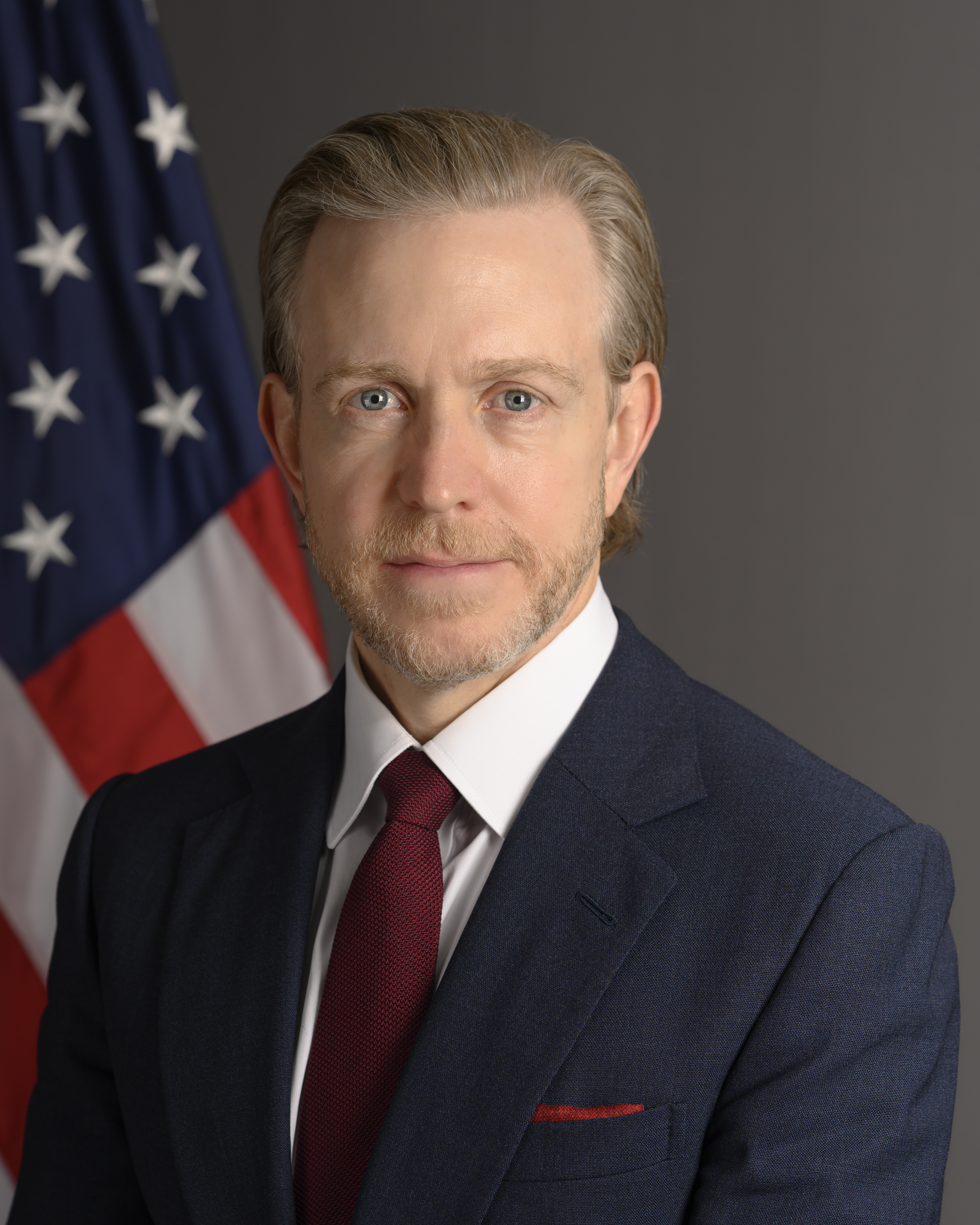
- Official portrait, 2025

27th United States Ambassador to Denmark
- Incumbent
- Assumed office November 5, 2025
- President: Donald Trump
- Preceded by: Alan M. Leventhal

United States Ambassador to Sweden
- In office November 7, 2019 – January 20, 2021
- President: Donald Trump
- Preceded by: Azita Raji
- Succeeded by: Erik Ramanathan

Personal details
- Born: Kenneth Alan Howery; November 4, 1975 (age 51)
- Education: Stanford University (BA)
- Known for: Co-founder and CFO at PayPal; Co-founder and partner at Founders Fund

Kenneth Alan Howery (/ˈhaʊəri/; born November 4, 1975) is an American entrepreneur and diplomat who is currently serving as the 27th United States Ambassador to Denmark. He is a co-founder of PayPal and Founders Fund. He served as the U.S. ambassador to Sweden from 2019 to 2021 under President Donald Trump.

On December 22, 2024, President-elect Trump announced his intention to nominate Howery as the next U.S. ambassador to Denmark. On October 7, 2025, the nomination was confirmed by the Senate.

== Early life and education ==
Howery was born in 1975 in Texas. Later graduating from Stanford University in 1998 with a B.A. in economics. While at Stanford, he was managing editor of The Stanford Review, a student-run newspaper founded by Peter Thiel.

== Career ==
The same year he graduated, he co-founded PayPal with Peter Thiel, Luke Nosek, Elon Musk, and Max Levchin. The group of founders became known as the PayPal Mafia, which included other peers and early investors. From 1998 to 2002, Howery was PayPal's CFO. Following PayPal's acquisition by eBay in 2002, Howery was eBay's Director of Corporate Development until 2003. Howery then rejoined Thiel in 2004 at Clarium Capital Management, where he was vice president of private equity, as well as a member of the research and trading teams.

In March 2012, the World Economic Forum named Howery a Young Global Leader, a community of “socially-minded men and women selected under the age of 40, who operate as a force for good to overcome barriers that elsewhere stand in the way of progress." He is also a member of the Selection Committee for the World Economic Forum Technology Pioneers Program.

In 2005, Howery and Thiel, along with fellow PayPal alumnus, Nosek, started Founders Fund, a San Francisco-based venture capital firm with over $3 billion under management, where he was co-founder and partner. He has been on the boards of Quantcast and ZocDoc. In 2010, Venture Capital Journal named Howery one of the Top 10 VCs under 36. He has lectured on entrepreneurship at Harvard Business School and Stanford, and has helped students at UC Berkeley and the McCombs School of Business develop business models.

Howery is a member of The Explorers Club, a non-profit group that promotes scientific exploration.

Howery is an advisor to Kiva, a 501(c)(3) charity organization which enables people to lend money via the Internet to low-income entrepreneurs and students in over 80 countries. He is a member of the U.S. Council on Competitiveness, which has a stated goal of increasing the United States' economic competitiveness in the global marketplace.

Howery's net worth stands at $1.5 billion.

=== Diplomacy ===
==== Kingdom of Sweden ====
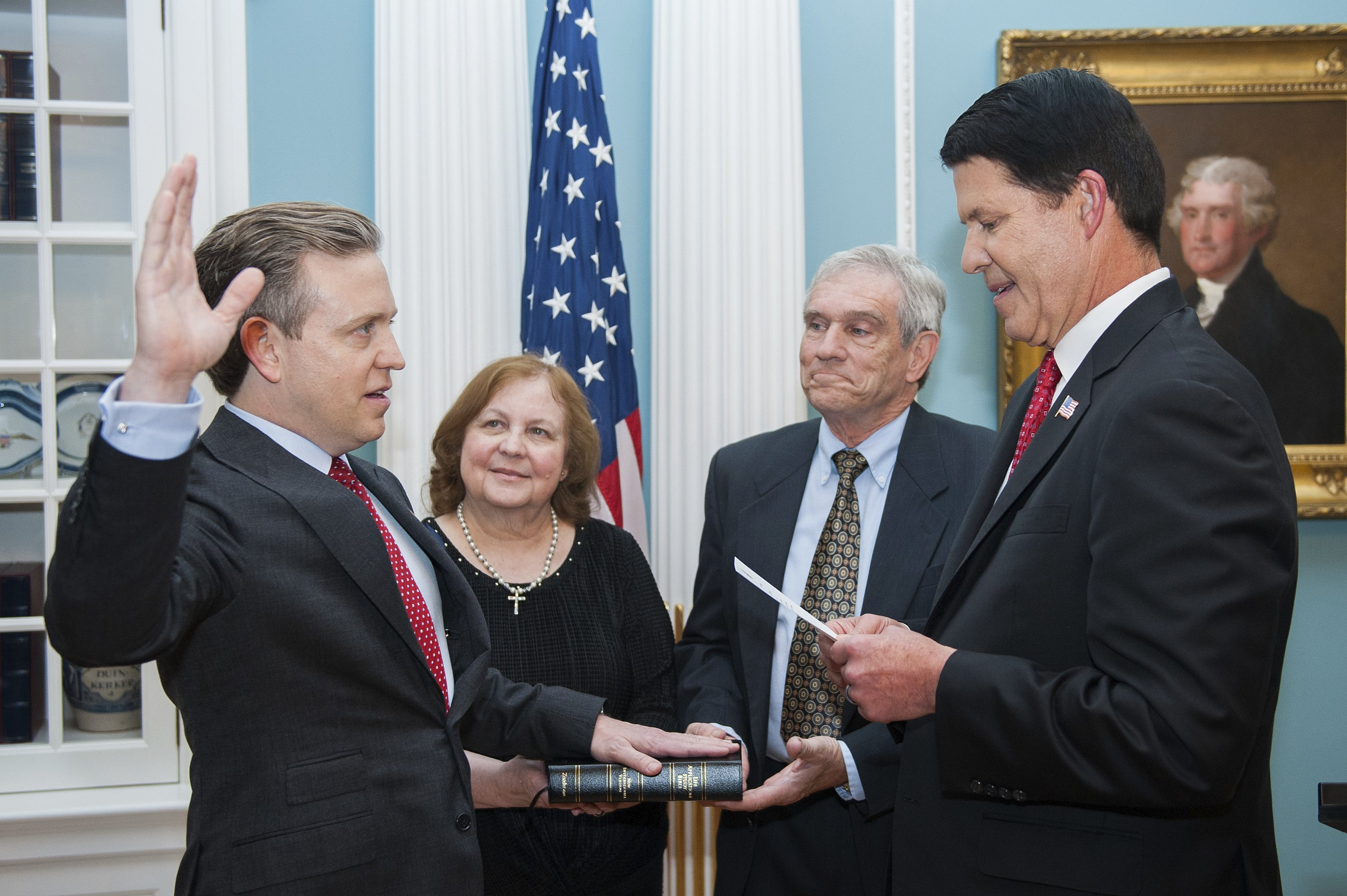
Ken Howery is formally sworn in as U.S. Ambassador to the Kingdom of Sweden.

On January 16, 2019, Howery was nominated by President Donald Trump to be Ambassador Extraordinary and Plenipotentiary of the United States of America to the Kingdom of Sweden. Following a confirmation hearing on May 16, 2019, the Senate Foreign Relations Committee favorably reported Howery's nomination to the Senate, which confirmed Howery on September 17, 2019, by a vote of 62–32. In his confirmation hearing, Howery stated his priorities as ambassador would include pursuing expanded economic and trade relationships, advancing mutual security commitments, and promoting science, technology and entrepreneurship opportunities.

Howery was sworn in as ambassador on October 10, 2019, and presented his credentials to His Majesty King Carl XVI Gustaf on November 7, 2019.

As ambassador, Howery was active across a number of policy areas. Howery engaged with Swedish officials on defense issues and military strategy, including pressing for increased interoperability of U.S. and Swedish military systems. He also advocated for the longstanding U.S. goal of increased European defense spending; Sweden approved a 40% increase in defense spending over five years during Howery's tenure - the largest increase in more than 70 years. President Trump later praised Howery's leadership on increasing defense, security, and economic cooperation between the United States and Sweden, saying "he served our [n]ation brilliantly," as an ambassador.

Howery strongly advocated for clean 5G technology, promoting the official U.S Department of State position that encourages the use of equipment made by Swedish manufacturer Ericsson and asserts that Huawei-made products are a security risk to democracies. Howery met with senior Swedish officials on 5G security in September, 2020, and Sweden subsequently announced a ban on equipment from telecommunication companies Huawei and ZTE in its 5G network. Howery also promoted increased cooperation, including on security issues, between the U.S. and Sweden in the Arctic. In October 2020, Sweden published its first new Arctic Strategy in a decade, highlighting concerns about deteriorating global relations and the growth of military activity in the Arctic. His Arctic advocacy included helping establish a partnership between the Arctic Initiative at the Harvard Kennedy School of Government and Sweden's Luleå University of Technology.

As Sweden serves as the protecting power for the United States in North Korea, Howery worked to maintain a strong communication channel for the push for denuclearization, and worked with Swedish officials to counter disinformation, and promote democracy, human rights, free trade, and regional security.

Howery advocated for the importance of transparency and information-sharing between countries to respond effectively to the COVID-19 pandemic. He led efforts by U.S. Embassy Stockholm to assist Swedish manufacturer Getinge with supply chain issues, helping it to expand production of ventilators for the benefit of COVID-19 patients in the United States and around the world.

Howery engaged with the Swedish academic community, including on the role universities can play in entrepreneurship and the importance of academic integrity. He conducted outreach to the U.S. and Swedish business communities in Sweden, including delivering speeches at the Swedish-American Chamber of Commerce and the American Chamber of Commerce. He also engaged with top Swedish scientific research institutes, science parks, and Sweden's Innovation Agency.

In response to growing calls for Sweden's NATO accession following Russia's full-scale invasion of Ukraine in February 2022, Howery authored an op-ed saying the Ukraine invasion had dramatically shifted public opinion in Sweden about NATO, and that the country would "make an outstanding addition" to the alliance and its joining "will be cause for celebration."

==== Kingdom of Denmark ====
President-elect Donald Trump announced Howery as his choice to be Ambassador Extraordinary and Plenipotentiary of the United States of America to the Kingdom of Denmark on December 22, 2024.

== Personal life ==
Howery is single.

He has a house at Powder Mountain, a ski resort at Utah. In 2021, The Wall Street Journal reported that Howery and Musk were staying at Howery's 8,000-square-foot home near the Colorado River in Austin. Musk, however, denied the claim in an email statement to Business Insider at the time.

According to the WSJ report in December 2021, after his term as U.S. ambassador to Sweden ended, he had "been traveling the world, including chasing tornadoes and other extreme weather events as a hobby, people who know him say."

== See also ==
- America PAC

Diplomatic posts
Preceded by Azita Raji	United States Ambassador to Sweden; 2019–2021	Succeeded by Erik Ramanathan
Preceded by Alan M. Leventhal	United States Ambassador to Denmark; 2025–present	Incumbent
