= Tibber =

Norwegian energy company

Logo

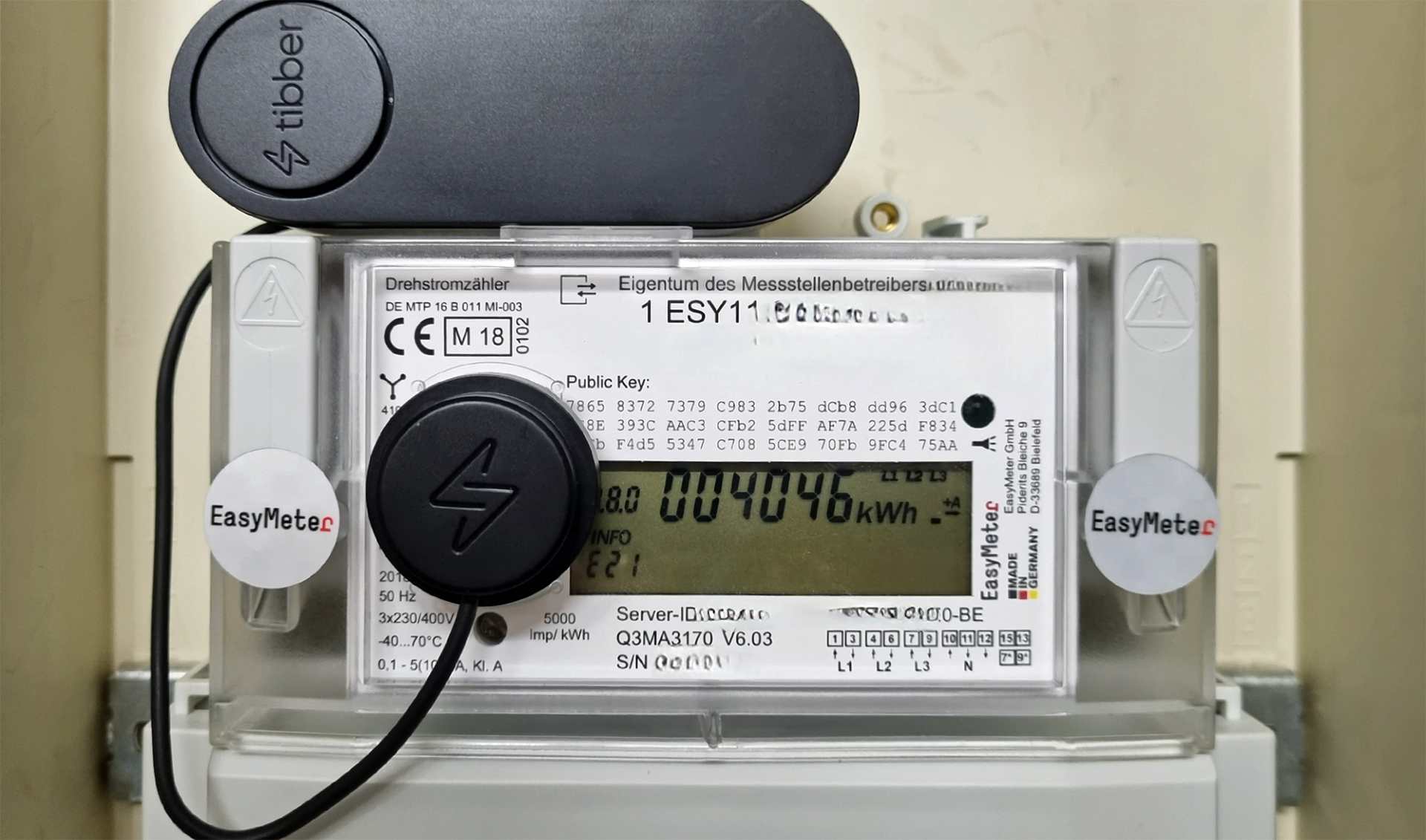
The Tibber Bridge receives data from the Tibber Pulse and sends it to the Tibber server via Wi-Fi and the internet.

Tibber is a Norwegian electricity provider based in Førde that sells green electricity in Norway, Sweden, Germany and the Netherlands. Its business model is based on revenue from a fixed monthly base fee, the sale of smart home hardware in its own online store, and income from marketing flexibility on the electricity market.

== Markets and market shares ==
Tibber first has started operating in Norway and shortly later in Sweden. On 27 May 2020, an online launch event announced the start of sales in Germany and market entry in other European countries. Tibber is represented in Germany by a limited company (GmbH) based in Berlin. In October 2020, Tibber reported 100,000 customers.

== Impact ==
According to tests, Tibber has stabilised the electricity grid in Norway. In Sweden, it was approved for the electricity grid stabilisation market (frequency containment reserve, FCR) in 2020.

== See also ==
- Electricity sector in Norway
- Electricity sector in Sweden
- Electricity sector in Germany
- Electricity sector in the Netherlands
