= Nucleus Genomics =

American startup company

- Type: Private
- Incorporated: 2021
- Founded: 2021
- Founder: Kian Sadeghi
- Headquarters: New York, United States
- Website: https://mynucleus.com/

Nucleus Genomics is an American biotechnology company focused on reproductive and preventive genetics. The company offers genome health testing for adults, genetic analysis of in vitro embryos that includes polygenic risk assessment, and integrated fertility services. The company was founded in 2021 by Kian Sadeghi. Its services have been criticized by a number of geneticists and researchers.

== History ==
Nucleus Genomics was founded in New York in 2021 by Kian Sadeghi, who was at the time a 21-year-old computational biology student who had recently left the University of Pennsylvania. Sadeghi was a recipient of the Thiel Fellowship. After establishing the company, Sadeghi raised about $32 million in funding, including from Peter Thiel, Balaji Srinivasan, and Alexis Ohanian's venture capital company.

The company states that it uses what it calls "genetic optimization" in order to estimate the likelihood of a number of genetic traits of an embryo, including its IQ score, eye and hair color, height, and its predisposition to having certain diseases, such as autism, Type 2 diabetes, and cancer. The company adds its embryo polygenic scoring to the conventional PGT analyses done by other labs.

The company acquired impute.me, a polygenic risk score platform, in 2022. It also acquired Irish biotech Cambrean, an AI health-data platform, in early 2025.

As of March 2026, the company had expanded its services to India, Saudi Arabia and Jordan. A number of its services have been limited in India and the United Kingdom, where selecting embryos based on certain characteristics is illegal. The company has also stated that a number of models its technologies are based on have been made publicly available for third-party review.

=== Funding ===
Nucleus Genomics has raised $32 million across multiple funding rounds. In January 2025, the company raised $14 million in a Series A funding round. Founders Fund, Asylum Ventures, Seven Seven Six, Samsung Next, and One Eight Capital are reported as investors.

== Technology and Services ==
Customer DNA samples are sequenced in the United States using sequencing instruments developed by Illumina. Testing is conducted through laboratories that are CLIA-certified and CAP-accredited.

The company launched Health in March 2024. It provides whole-genome sequencing for adults using a saliva sample. An advanced carrier screening service debuted in August 2024.

The company introduced Nucleus Embryo in June 2025, a software platform used during in-vitro fertilization that analyzes embryos.

In 2025, the company launched a feature for prospective parents to assess how their DNA would align. According to Sadeghi, the feature examines "a couple's DNA, and we calculate their risk of passing down over 900 different conditions to their children".

Also in 2025, the company launched IVF+, a fertility program for patients, with partner clinics including Beverly Hills Fertility, Neway Fertility in New York, and CdelaF in Mexico. In 2026, IVF+ expanded to 160 clinics across India and the Middle East, and partnered with the Southern California Reproductive Center.

== Scientific and public reception ==
Writing for the Scientific American, bioethicist Arthur Kaplan and geneticist James Tabery wrote that Nucleus Genomics' products do not do what the company claims. Kaplan and Tabery compared Sadeghi to Theranos founder Elizabeth Holmes, who they said was also a university dropout who exaggerated her company's abilities.

Kaplan and Tabery wrote that, although certain genetic variants have been shown to have varying correlations with some expressed human traits, research has consistently shown that there are no major genetic markers for traits such as intelligence, body-mass index or longevity. They also wrote that Nucleus Genomics' products could lead prospective parents to discard "perfectly healthy embryos". Further, that its genetic optimization service could result in parents expecting their children to live up to unusual standards due to the results of the tests they purchased.

In an article published by The Times, Tabery said that "[i]f Nucleus really lets you optimise your potential child's" human traits, "then there would be some deep ethical questions to ask about designer babies, the legacy of eugenics and the marketisation of children." Cambridge University geneticist Ruxandra Teslo said that Nucleus Genomics was a "non-rigorous company", adding that people should "speak out against this misuse of science".

Education scholar Ben Williamson said that Nucleus Genomics was promoting "bad science as big business". Harvard Medical School associate professor Sasha Gusev has criticized the company in statements, saying the technology was not yet clinically actionable." The company has disputed these characterizations, stating that its technology is intended for probabilistic risk awareness and preventative health planning rather than deterministic prediction.

American psychologist Eric Turkheimer has described Nucleus Genomics as a "new eugenics compan[y]". Sadeghi said that the company's "genetic optimization" test is not eugenics "by any stretch, because it's fundamentally about empowering people with information that they can use to give their child the best start in life". He also claimed in a video that his company was the first in history to help prospective parents "optimize their embryos based on intelligence".

Supporters have argued that polygenic prediction may help families reduce inherited disease risk and represents a continuation of practices such as carrier screening and preimplantation genetic testing, while acknowledging that predictive accuracy remains an active area of scientific research and ethical debate.

In November 2025, Nucleus launched the Have Your Best Baby advertising campaign, promoting its embryo analysis services. The ad campaign received widespread attention and criticism. In 2026, Nucleus launched a second iteration of this ad, this time featuring IVF physicians who support the technology. In April 2026, Sadeghi appeared on the Tucker Carlson Show. In 2026 a study examining public opinion on polygenic embryo testing found that 61% participants supported having this information, and over half supported testing for non-medical traits.
