= GoTenna =

American professional mesh networking startup

goTenna
- Type: Privately held company
- Founded: November 2012
- Founders: Daniela Perlein, Jorge Perdomo
- Headquarters: United States
- Brands: goTenna, goTenna Mesh, goTenna Pro, goTenna Plus
- Website: gotenna.com

goTenna (goTenna Inc.) is a technology company that creates mesh networking devices that pair with smartphones, allowing users to send texts and share locations on a peer-to-peer basis without needing active cell networks

== History ==
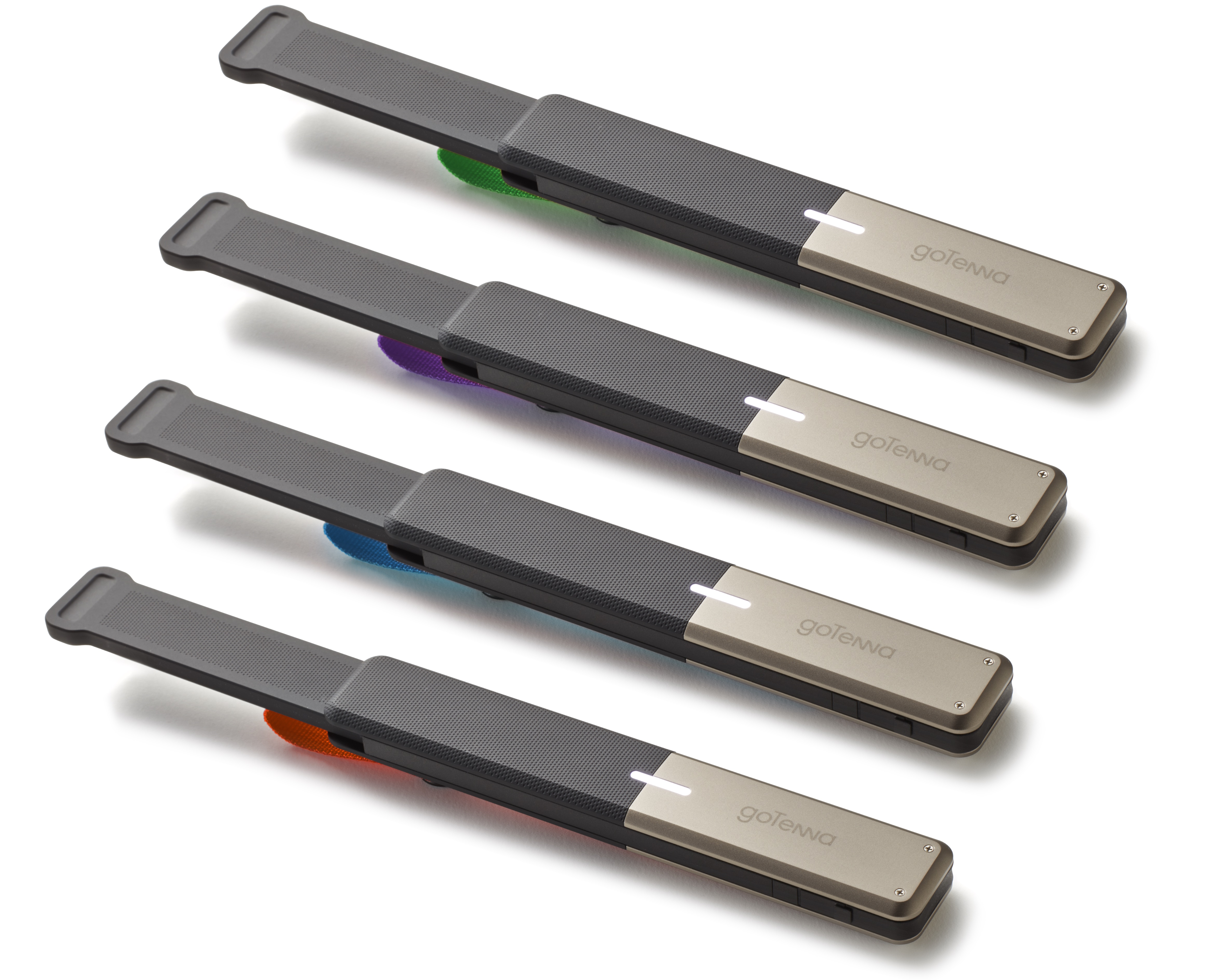
goTenna V1.

The idea for goTenna came about after Hurricane Sandy knocked out 25 percent of cell towers, and caused outages for 25 percent of Internet services, across 10 states on the East Coast. Officially incorporated in April 2013,

In 2014, goTenna rolled out its first consumer product, the goTenna, a pocket-size communication tool that lets off-grid travelers talk to one another without cell service.

In September 2016, goTenna launched goTenna Plus, a, subscription-based upgrade to the goTenna applications, which includes the capability to use other goTenna users as gateways to relay messages through to traditional SMS networks. The company also released its software development kit, enabling developers to create new applications using goTenna hardware. However, its license does not permit use with open source copyleft licenses. Around the same time, goTenna unveiled a second-generation device: goTenna Mesh, the first consumer-ready mesh network of its kind, available to 49 countries.

== goTenna Pro ==
In March 2017, the company announced its goTenna Pro line, for professional mobile radio communications needs, leaving the consumer market for government markets. To finance its pivot, the company raised $24M in Series C equity and debt funding in 2019

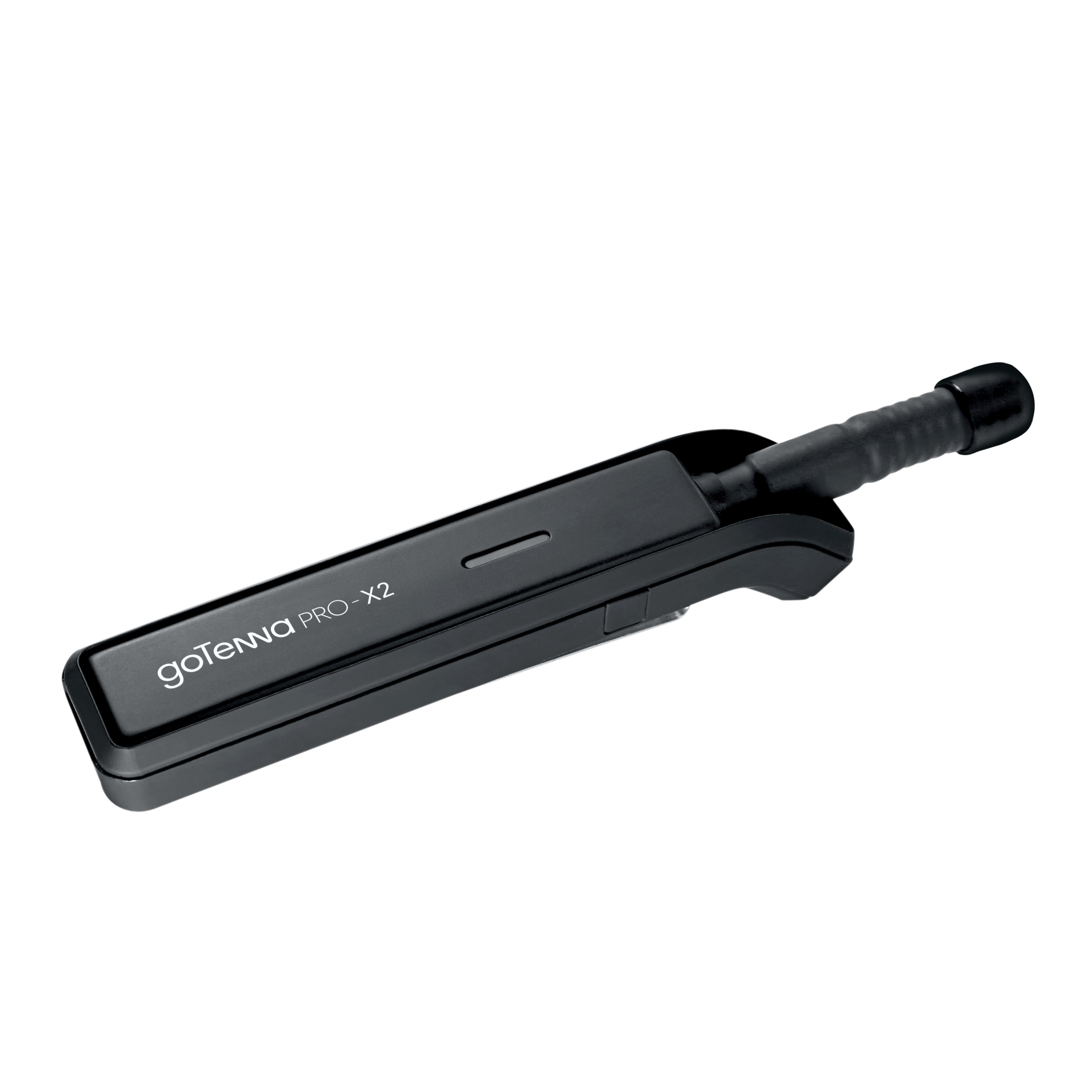
goTenna Pro X2 radio.

== Awards ==
- CES Innovation Award 2017: Wireless Accessory
- Industrial Designers Society of America – IDEA 2016 Gold
- Edison Awards Gold – Innovative Services
- CES Innovation Award 2015: Tech for a Better World
- Fast Company 2015 Innovation by Design
- Core77 2015 Design Awards

== See also ==
Meshtastic - an open source equivalent
