= Alix Peabody =

American entrepreneur and investor

- Born: New York City, New York, U.S.
- Education: Dartmouth College
- Known for: Bev

Alix Peabody is an American entrepreneur and investor known for founding the company Bev.

== Early life and education ==
Peabody was born in New York City to Doug Peabody and Annick Cooper and earned her bachelor's degree from Dartmouth College, majoring in Mathematics and English. She was admitted to the University of Southern California's (USC) Film School program in screenwriting. She later dropped out of USC to focus on her entrepreneurial career.

== Career ==
After completing her undergraduate studies, she gained experience in the finance industry, working at Bridgewater Associates. In 2015, while working as an executive headhunter for tech companies in Silicon Valley, she faced health challenges that led her to organize ticketed pool parties to cover her medical bills. Her work as a pool party organizer inspired her to start her wine supply company to market canned wine spritzers to women.

In 2017, Peabody enrolled in the beverage industry, starting Bev, a canned wine supplier based in Venice, California. She paid the first batch of Bev with the retirement account she had gotten while working at Bridgewater Associates. In 2021, Bev signed a distribution deal with E & J Gallo Winery which acquired Bev in 2023.

== Recognitions ==
Alix Peabody, along with Bev, have received numerous awards and recognitions, including Ad Age's Visionary/Founder of the Year (2021), Inc's Female Founders 100 list (2021), and Digiday's Future Leader Award (2021).
