= Mobalytics =

American esports analytics company

Gamers Net, Inc.
- Type: Private
- Industry: Gaming, eSports
- Founded: August 2016
- Founder: Amine Issa, Bogdan Suchyk, Nikolay Lobanov
- Headquarters: Marina Del Rey, California, United States
- Website: https://mobalytics.gg

Mobalytics (incorporated as Gamers Net, Inc.) is an American Esports company based in Marina Del Rey, California. It specializes in providing visual analytics and performance data to competitive gamers, aimed at improving gaming performance. The software uses in-game data and machine learning algorithms to detect weaknesses of the players and provide methods of enhancing player performance through visual analysis and insights.

== History ==
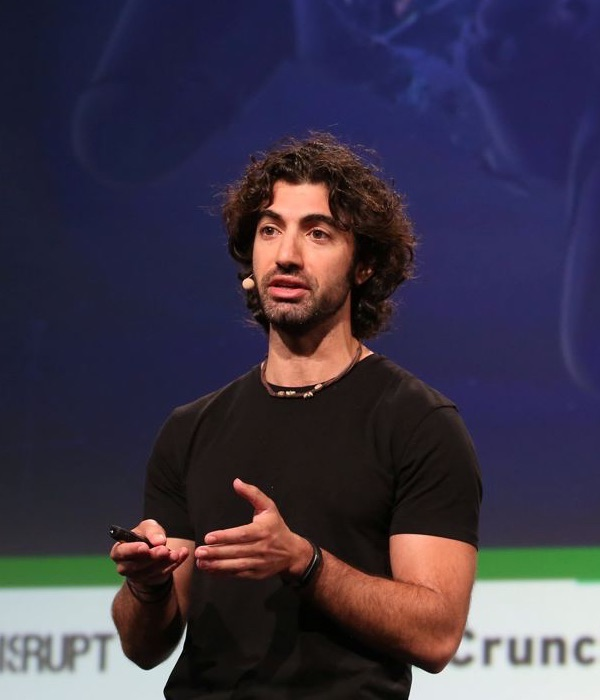
Amine Issa at Disrupt SF Startup Battlefield 2016

Mobalytics was founded on August 1, 2016 by Amine Issa, Bogdan Suchyk and Nikolay Lobanov.

In 2016, Mobalytics won TechCrunch's Premiere Startup competition, Startup Battlefield, taking the $50,000 prize. The founding team entered the competition with only two hours to spare before the entries closed. Following the win and subsequent investment boost, the three founders formed the core team and began to expand their operations. In July 2020, Mobalytics announced it had raised $11.25 million. Investors included GGV Capital, Axiomatic and T1 eSports. During the investment round, the Mobalytics community was estimated to have reached over 7 million members.

In December 2020, Mobalytics announced content partnership with a broadcast channel GINX eSport TV.

== Technology ==
Mobalytics implemented a rating system called Gamer Performance Index (GPI) that evaluates the performance of the players. A visual map is provided with metrics that indicate the gaming skills in need of improvement, such as fighting, farming, vision, aggression, survivability, teamplay, consistency and versatility. The GPI analyzes gaming strengths and weaknesses, and provides insight for both players and their competitors. The Mobalytics software bases its analysis on recordings of the gaming matches. In 2019, the company partnered with a Swedish technology company Tobii to develop eye-tracking technology that is expected to provide a more complex behavioral analysis.

== Game titles ==
Since its launch, the Mobalytics platform has grown to currently support four game titles by Riot Games: League of Legends, Teamfight Tactics, Legends of Runeterra, and VALORANT.
