= Quantcast =

American technology company

Quantcast Corporation

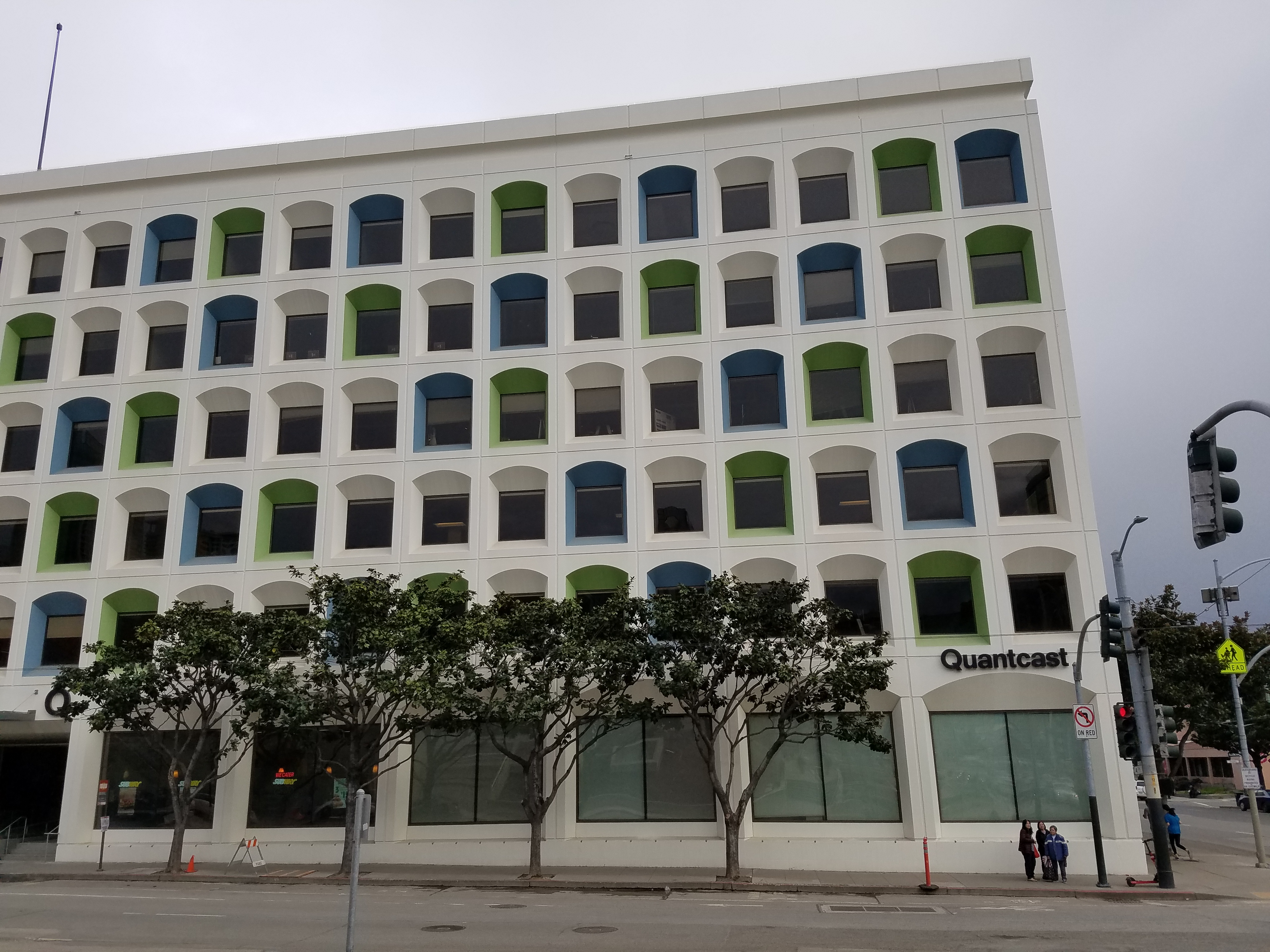
- Quantcast offices in San Francisco (2019)
- Type: Private
- Industry: SaaS/PaaS (Software-as-a-Service / Platform-as-a-Service)
- Founded: 2006
- Headquarters: San Francisco, California, U.S.
- Area served: International
- Key people: Konrad Feldman (CEO); Christopher Zimmerman (CTO)
- Products: Quantcast Platform; Quantcast Measure; Quantcast Advertise
- ASN: 27281
- Website: quantcast.com

Quantcast is an American technology company, founded in 2006, that specializes in advertising, audience insights and measurement. It has offices in the United States, Canada, Australia, Singapore, United Kingdom, Ireland, France, Germany, Italy, and Sweden.

== History ==
Quantcast was launched in 2006 by Konrad Feldman and Paul Sutter. Feldman, a British computer scientist who had studied at University College London and previously co-founded Searchspace, a financial fraud detection software company acquired by Warburg Pincus in 2006, moved to San Francisco to pursue opportunities at the intersection of machine learning and internet data.

In 2010, Quantcast's Publisher Program was the first syndicated online traffic measurement service to receive official accreditation from the Media Rating Council (MRC).

In 2013, the company acquired MakeGood Software, an advertising technology startup that simplifies data management and reporting for online advertising campaigns. The technology was subsequently integrated with Quantcast Advertise to enhance the reporting functions available for Quantcast campaigns. This nudged the company closer towards competition in the ad effectiveness category, which includes companies like Comscore.
