= Ida Tin =

Danish internet entrepreneur and author (born 1979)

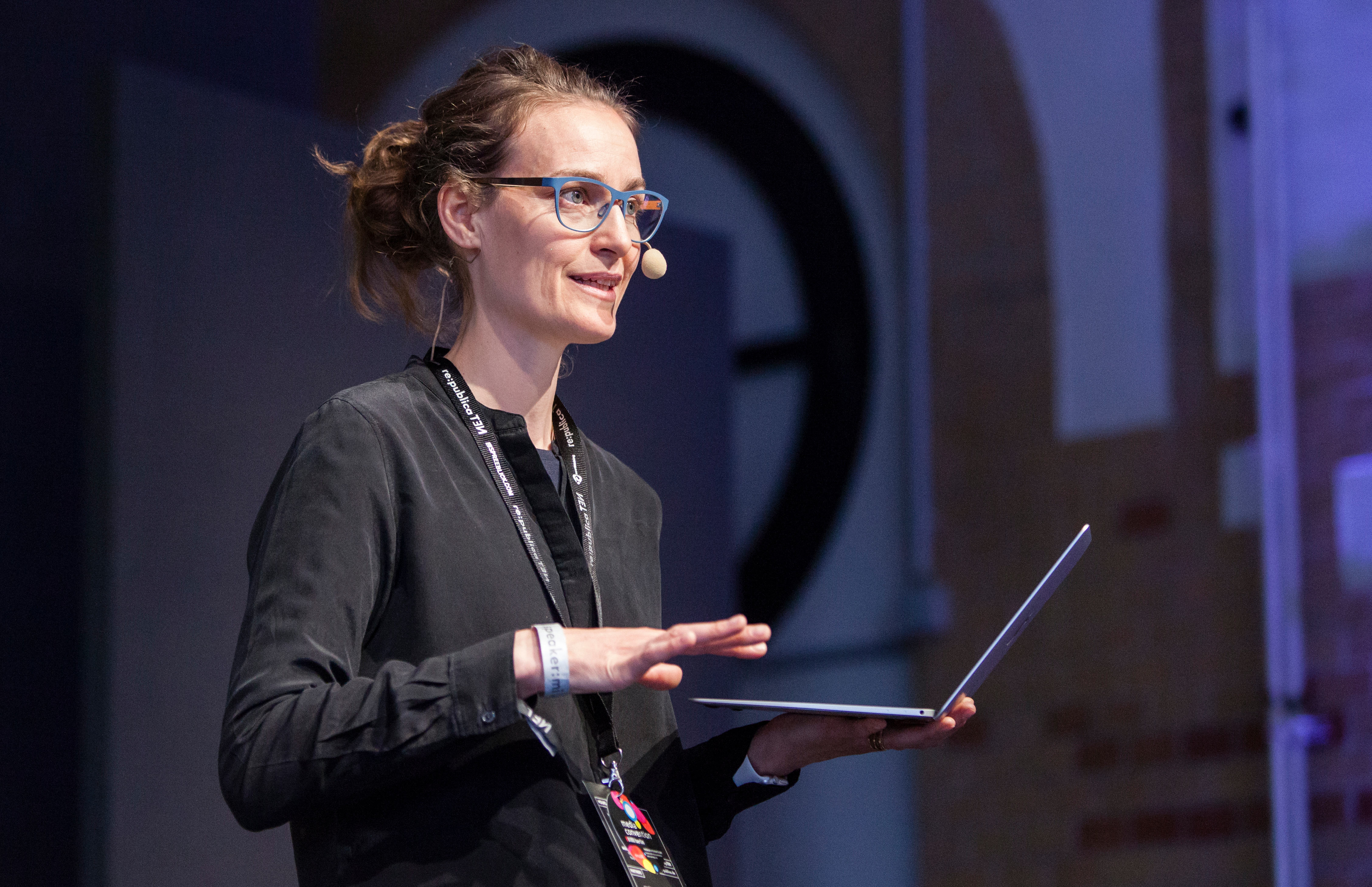
- Born: 28 May 1979 (age 47); Copenhagen, Denmark
- Education: Kaospilot
- Occupation: Internet entrepreneur
- Known for: Co-founder and CEO of Clue
- Website: Clue official website

Ida Tin (born 28 May 1979) is a Danish internet entrepreneur and author who is the co-founder and CEO of the women's menstruation-tracking app, Clue. She is credited with coining the term "femtech".

== Early life and education ==
Tin was born and raised in Copenhagen, Denmark. She graduated from the Danish alternative business school, Kaospilot.

== Career ==
Prior to founding Clue, Tin ran a motorcycle tour company based in Denmark with her father. She was with the company for five years and toured locations like Vietnam, the United States, Cuba, Chile, and Mongolia. Her experiences during these journeys later inspired her to write memoir titled "Direktøs", which became a Danish bestseller.

Tin was inspired to create Clue out of personal frustration with the lack of innovation in family planning tools and the limited understanding many individuals had of their reproductive health. She began to develop the concept after questioning why it was still difficult to determine basic information such as the likelihood of pregnancy on a given day, the timing of one's next period, or potential side effects of birth control methods. Motivated by these gaps, she envisioned a scientifically grounded, user-friendly mobile application that could empower women and people who menstruate to track their cycles and gain deeper insights into their bodies. Tin began formulating an idea for the app in 2009 as a way to track her own menstrual and fertility cycle.

In 2012, Tin co-founded the Clue app with Hans Raffauf, Moritz von Buttlar, and Mike LaVigne in Berlin, Germany. The app officially launched in 2013 and provided a platform for users to monitor menstrual cycles, fertility windows, and over 30 health indicators including sleep, mood, pain, and energy levels. Clue quickly gained traction, reaching approximately 1 million active users by mid-2015. Later that year in October 2015, the company raised $7 million in a funding round led by Union Square Ventures and Mosaic Ventures, bringing the total amount of funding up to $10 million.

By November 2015, Clue's active user base had risen to 2 million across more than 180 countries. That same year, Tin worked with Apple to help them develop their own period tracking software for their HealthKit platform. Her entrepreneurial efforts earned her recognition as Female Web Entrepreneur of the Year at the 2015 Slush Conference.

In 2016, Tin was credited for coining the term "femtech" to describe the growing sector of technology focused on women's health. The term to referred to technology that addressed needs related to fertility, period-tracking, pregnancy, menopause and more. In September 2016, Tin spoke at the TechCrunch Disrupt event in San Francisco on the topic of analytics in women's health. Two months later, Clue raised an additional $20 million in a funding round led by Nokia Growth Partners.

Throughout 2016 and 2017, Tin helped introduce new features in the Clue app, including cycle-sharing and pill-tracking. In 2017, Tin announced that Clue was working on adding features to serve app users going through menopause. By 2018, Clue had 10 million users in 190 countries.

In 2021, Clue received clearance from the U.S. Food and Drug Administration (FDA) to market its algorithm as a digital contraceptive, making it one of the first apps of its kind to be certified as a birth control method in the United States. Tin stepped down as CEO later that year but remained closely involved with the company as Chairwoman, continuing to shape its strategic vision.

Despite experiencing a 25% reduction in workforce in early 2023, Clue remains a leading product in the femtech space. Under Tin's leadership, the app contributed to academic collaborations with institutions such as the University of Exeter, supplying anonymized user data to research studies on conditions such as endometriosis and premenstrual dysphoric disorder (PMDD).

Tin's career has had a lasting impact not only on health tracking and reproductive technology but also on how women's health is discussed, researched, and funded in the global tech landscape.

== Personal life ==
Tin lives in Berlin. Her ex-partner (and fellow Clue co-founder) is Hans Raffauf whom she has two children with, Elliot and Eleanor.
