= Nour Emam =

Egyptian technology entrepreneur, doula and reproductive health activist

Nour Emam (Arabic: نور إمام) is an Egyptian technology entrepreneur, doula and reproductive health activist. She is co-founder and CEO of the Cairo-based femtech startup company Daleela by Motherbeing.

== Biography ==
Emam underwent a medically unnecessary C-section when giving birth to her daughter, then suffered from postpartum depression and PTSD, which went undiagnosed for eight months. After this experience, she became an activist for sexual and reproductive health, subjects which are considered taboo in the Middle East and North Africa (MENA). She trained as a doula for five months in Canada and studied managing postpartum depression in Britain.

Emam founded Cairo based fem-tech company MotherBeing in January 2020 and works as CEO. It has become one of the leading platforms for sex education in the Arab world, and serves over 150,000 users in Egypt, Saudi Arabia and Iraq via an AI-powered health assistant specifically designed for Arab women. The app features video clips of Emam which teach women about their bodies including menstrual health, sexually transmitted diseases and the conception of children.

In 2023, Motherbeing donated sanitary pads to women in Gaza. In 2025, Emam's organisation was rebranded as Daleela by Motherbeing and she staged the inaugural Women’s Health Summit in Egypt in May 2025.

Emam has also spoken on podcasts such as a 2025 episode of The Egyptian Streets, where she discussed misconceptions in sexual health and myth-busting old traditions, and on YouTube channel Medsulto. She was recognised on CairoScene's impact list in 2020 and was named a BBC 100 Women in 2024.
