= The War on Normal People =

2018 book by Andrew Yang

- First edition cover
- Author: Andrew Yang
- Audio read by: Andrew Yang
- Cover artist: Jette Productions (photo); Amanda Kain (design)
- Language: English
- Subject: U.S. economy; automation; technological unemployment; universal basic income
- Genre: Non-fiction
- Publisher: Hachette Books
- Publication date: April 3, 2018
- Publication place: United States
- Media type: Print (hardcover and paperback), e-book
- Pages: 304
- ISBN: 978-0-316-41424-1 (hardcover)
- Dewey Decimal: 331.2/36
- LC Class: HC79.I5 Y348 2018

The War on Normal People: The Truth About America's Disappearing Jobs and Why Universal Basic Income Is Our Future is a 2018 book written by Andrew Yang, an American entrepreneur and Venture for America founder, who would later run as a 2020 Democratic presidential candidate on policy strategies discussed in the book. It was published by Hachette Books in the United States on April 3, 2018. A paperback edition was released on April 2, 2019. Yang narrated an audiobook version released on YouTube in September 2018.

Focusing on domestic issues, the book discusses technological change, automation, job displacement, the U.S. economy, and what Yang describes as the need for a universal basic income (UBI). Yang argues that "as technology continues to make many jobs obsolete, the government must take concrete steps to ensure economic stability for residents of the United States," including the provision of a UBI, which is one of three central policies of Yang's 2020 presidential campaign.

== Publishing history ==
The book was published by Hachette Books in the United States on April 3, 2018. A paperback edition was released on April 2, 2019.

== Synopsis ==
In the book, Yang discusses job displacement and the shrinking of local economies, terming it the "Great Displacement", which has been "the product of financialization, globalization, and technologization". He predicts that automation will eliminate millions of jobs, including white-collar jobs, such as attorneys specializing in document review and medical positions, as "computers have proven to be quite adept at reading and diagnosing radiology scans". Yang draws a distinction between "normal people" and technologically inclined people, noting that "the average starting salary in Silicon Valley for engineers is nearing $200,000, a draw that has led to a decline in humanities enrollments and boost in technical degrees". He predicts that automation will make "normal people" redundant, and that increasing unemployment can lead to violent protests.

Yang provides a "rebuttal to more optimistic thinkers, such as Thomas Friedman, who believe that Americans can be transformed into lifelong learners". According to Yang, 49% of American workers fall into one of the five most common jobs in the U.S. economy: administrative and clerical work, including call center workers; retail and cashiers; food service and food prep; truck drivers and transportation; and manufacturing workers.

Yang supports a universal basic income (UBI) of $1000 a month for every U.S. citizen, "paid for by a 10% value-added tax on all goods and services". He calls it the "Freedom Dividend" and claims that it "would replace the vast majority of existing welfare programs." Yang states that it would "eliminate poverty for the 41 million Americans now living below the poverty line" and "would also improve the bargaining power of millions of low-wage workers—forcing employers to increase wages, add benefits and improve conditions in order to retain them". He cites civil rights leader Martin Luther King Jr., former U.S. president Richard Nixon, and economist Milton Friedman as early supporters of a UBI. He argues that UBI will "enable people to more effectively transition from shrinking industries and environments to new ones" and be "perhaps the greatest catalyst to human creativity we have ever seen".

In addition to UBI, Yang calls for a new stage of capitalism called "human-centric capitalism", which incorporates "goals and measurements like childhood success rate, mental health, levels of engagement with work, [and] freedom from substance abuse." He argues that "GDP will be an increasingly misleading and flawed measurement over time, as more and more work is done by software, AI, and machines." He suggests that a UBI would spur a "social credit" system of bartering goods and services, as well as reform the higher education system to "teach and demonstrate some values".

== Significance ==
The topics discussed in the book, including technological change, automation, job displacement, the U.S. economy, and what Yang describes as the need for a UBI, were central to Yang's 2020 presidential campaign. Yang argued that "as technology continues to make many jobs obsolete, the government must take concrete steps to ensure economic stability for residents of the United States," including the provision of a UBI, which was one of three central policies of his 2020 campaign.

== Reception ==
Yang has discussed the book and its contents in numerous interviews, including Merion West, Recode Decode with Kara Swisher, and The Ben Shapiro Show. The book, as well as Yang's views and solutions, have received generally positive reviews.

Author and businesswoman Arianna Huffington gave the book a positive review, calling it "both a clear-eyed look at the depths of our social and economic problems and an innovative roadmap toward a better future." Major Garrett of CBS News found the book "fascinating and troubling". Entrepreneur Daymond John called the book "a must read", writing that Yang "sees the big picture" and that "every entrepreneur should read this book to understand the challenges of the next decade". Author Alec Ross wrote: "In this powerful book, Andrew Yang highlights the urgent need to rewrite America's social contract. In a call to arms that comes from both head and heart, Yang has made an important contribution to the debate about where America is headed and what we need to do about it."

In 2019, CNBC editor-at-large John Harwood ranked the book among his top five political books, calling it "another take on the forces fraying America's middle class. [Yang] draws our attention to eye-popping data points about where our economy is heading." Kirkus Reviews called the book "a sobering portrait of a crumbling polity" and "a provocative work of social criticism". Writing for The New York Times, American economist Robert Reich reviewed both Yang's book and Annie Lowrey's Give People Money, calling them "useful primers on the case for a [UBI]". Reich felt that "some form of [UBI] seems inevitable". Emily Witt of The New Yorker saw "Yang's arguments for his policies [as] empirical rather than sentimental." Felix Haas of World Literature Today commented that "following the challenges Yang discusses [might feel like] getting punched in the face repeatedly", but "Yang equally manages to convey an incredible sense of community."

Writing for The Wall Street Journal, Harvard economics professor Edward Glaeser said that while he shares "Yang's worries about the future of work", he disagrees with Yang's UBI proposal, stating that a "future in which two-thirds of America lives off UBI is a true horror". Andy Kroll of Rolling Stone wrote that Yang's book "lays out his views in greater detail but raises as many questions as it answers", and that it "places him firmly in the camp of those who believe economic anxiety played a decisive role in Trump's election and the rise of white nationalism".
