= Andrew Yang 2020 presidential campaign =

American political campaign

Friends of Andrew Yang
- Campaign: 2020 United States presidential election (Democratic Party primaries)
- Candidate: Andrew Yang; Entrepreneur; Founder of Venture for America
- Affiliation: Democratic Party
- Launched: November 6, 2017
- Suspended: February 11, 2020
- Headquarters: New York City, New York
- Key people: Evan Low (Co-chair); Zach Graumann (Campaign Manager)
- Receipts: US$31,683,196.87 (12/31/2019)
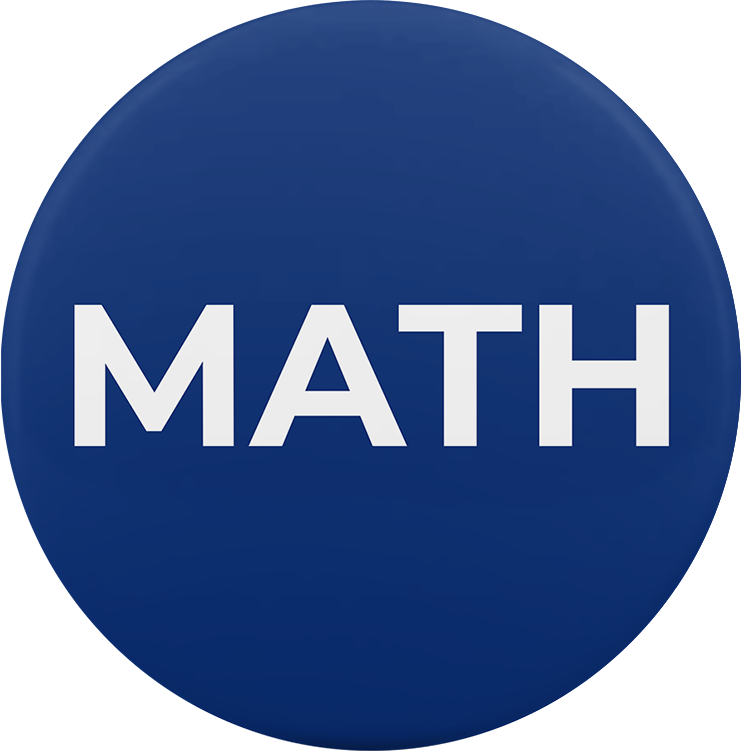
- Slogan(s): Humanity First; Not Left, Not Right, Forward; A New Way Forward; Make America Think Harder

Website
- www.2020.yang2020.com

The 2020 presidential campaign of Andrew Yang, an attorney, entrepreneur, and the founder of Venture for America, began on November 6, 2017, when Yang filed with the Federal Election Commission to participate in the Democratic primaries. Yang suspended his campaign on February 11, 2020, the night of the New Hampshire primary. On March 10, 2020, Yang endorsed Joe Biden for president.

With no prior political experience and low public recognition, Yang was widely considered a longshot candidate by the media during the early stages of his campaign. In April 2018, Yang released The War on Normal People, a book discussing job displacement, automation, and universal basic income (UBI), which were central to his campaign. Yang's profile significantly increased in early 2019 after appearing on the popular podcast The Joe Rogan Experience; he later appeared on numerous other podcasts, shows, and interviews. Yang's rise in notability was accompanied by the development of a devoted online fanbase that was known as the "Yang Gang". Yang raised about $41.6 million over the course of his campaign, with the vast majority of donations occurring during the final months of his candidacy. Yang qualified for and participated in all six Democratic primary debates held in 2019. In 2020, Yang did not meet the polling requirement for the seventh debate, but he later qualified for and participated in the eighth debate.

Yang's campaign strongly focused on the displacement of American workers through automation, a problem Yang stated was a major reason Donald Trump won the 2016 presidential election. To remedy this, Yang proposed the "Freedom Dividend," a monthly UBI of $1,000 to every American adult. Another key aspect of his candidacy was what he called "Human-Centered Capitalism", which would have replaced several traditional economic metrics with an "American Scorecard". Yang initially supported Medicare for All, but later proposed preserving private health insurance. On electoral reform, Yang supported ranked-choice voting and the implementation of democracy vouchers to drown out corporate donations. Yang proposed a version of the Green New Deal that would have reduced dependence on fossil fuels through policies such as a carbon tax and support for nuclear power. Yang's other policies included the decriminalization of opiates and legalization of cannabis, support for abortion rights and LGBT rights, and stricter gun control measures.

== Background ==
Yang graduated from Brown University in 1996, concentrating in economics and political science. He then attended Columbia Law School, earning a Juris Doctor in 1999. After working in law for five months, he transitioned into a business career, ultimately becoming CEO of test preparation company Manhattan GMAT. In 2011, Yang founded Venture for America (VFA), a nonprofit organization that encourages entrepreneurship by matching recent college graduates with startups in various cities across the United States. In 2012, President Barack Obama recognized Yang as a "Champion of Change" for his work with VFA. In 2015, Obama further recognized Yang as a "Presidential Ambassador for Global Entrepreneurship". Yang stepped down as VFA's leader in March 2017.

Yang stated that he first took an interest in universal basic income (UBI) after reading Martin Ford's book Rise of the Robots. Andy Stern's book Raising the Floor further persuaded Yang to support UBI. In 2017, Yang decided to run for president after Stern remarked to him that no presidential candidate supported UBI.

== Campaign ==
=== 2017 ===
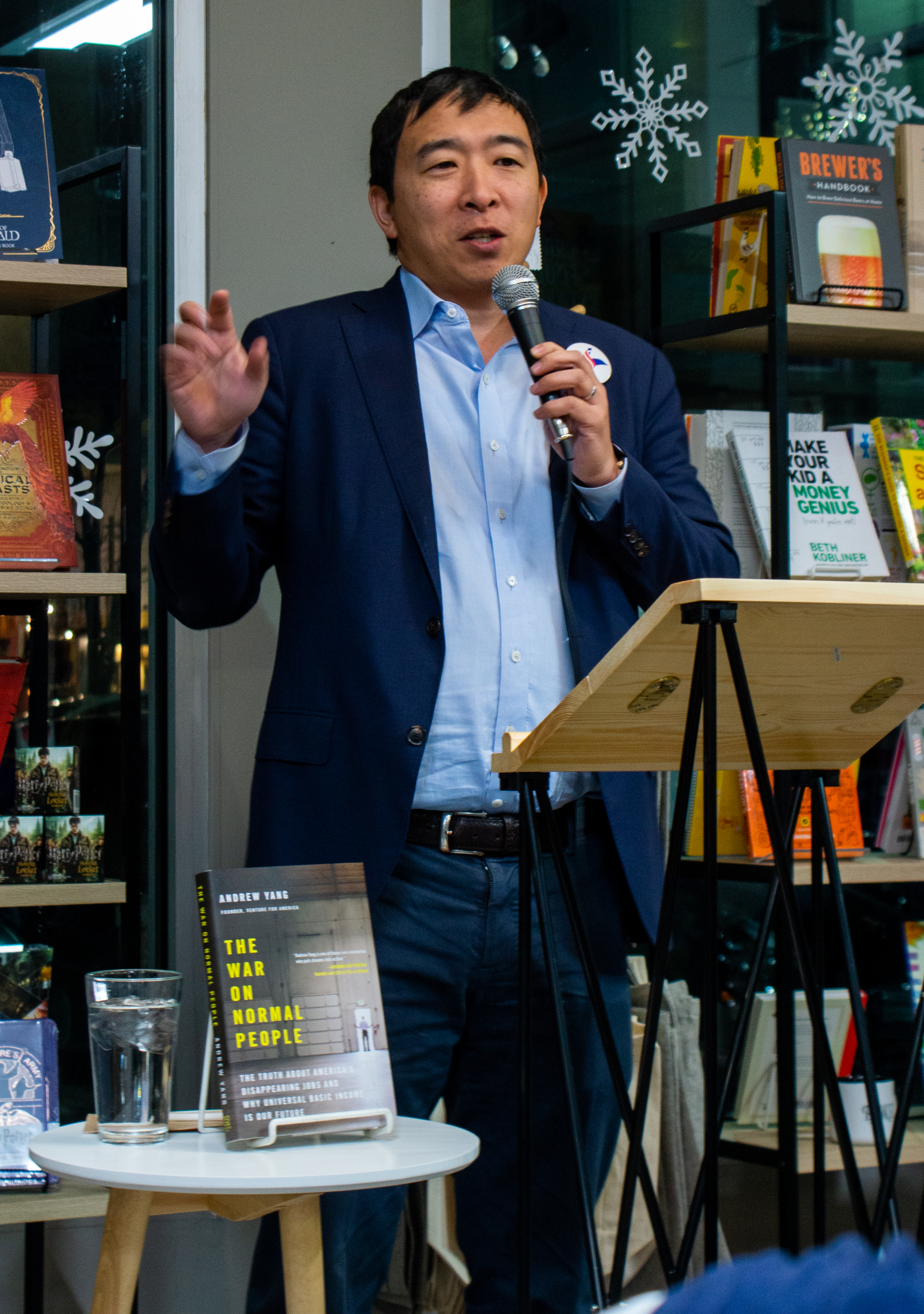
Yang makes a speech in New Hampshire in January 2019. His book, The War on Normal People, is displayed.

Yang's candidacy began on November 6, 2017, when he filed with the Federal Election Commission to participate in the Democratic primaries. Andrew Yang was the second Democrat to announce his candidacy for the presidency. The campaign began with a small initial staff working out of an apartment owned by Yang's mother. He ran on the slogans "Humanity First" and "Make America Think Harder" (MATH). According to BBC, Yang was "one of the first and most recognizable East Asian-Americans in history to run for president". He stated that he hoped his "campaign can inspire Asian Americans to be engaged in politics." Had he been nominated, he would have become the first Asian American to serve as any major party's presidential candidate, and had he been elected, he would have become the first Asian-American president.

=== 2018 ===
On April 3, 2018, Yang released The War on Normal People, a book discussing technological change, automation, job displacement, the economy, and the need for a UBI. In a press release on April 19, 2018, he announced that he would be personally giving one resident of New Hampshire $1,000 per month in 2019 to show the effectiveness of his UBI policy, the "Freedom Dividend". He announced that he would do the same thing in Iowa in 2019. On August 10, 2018, Yang was a keynote speaker at the largest Democratic fundraiser in Iowa, the Iowa Democratic Wing Ding. In 2018, he made seven trips to Iowa and six trips to New Hampshire, the first two states to vote in the primaries.

=== 2019 ===
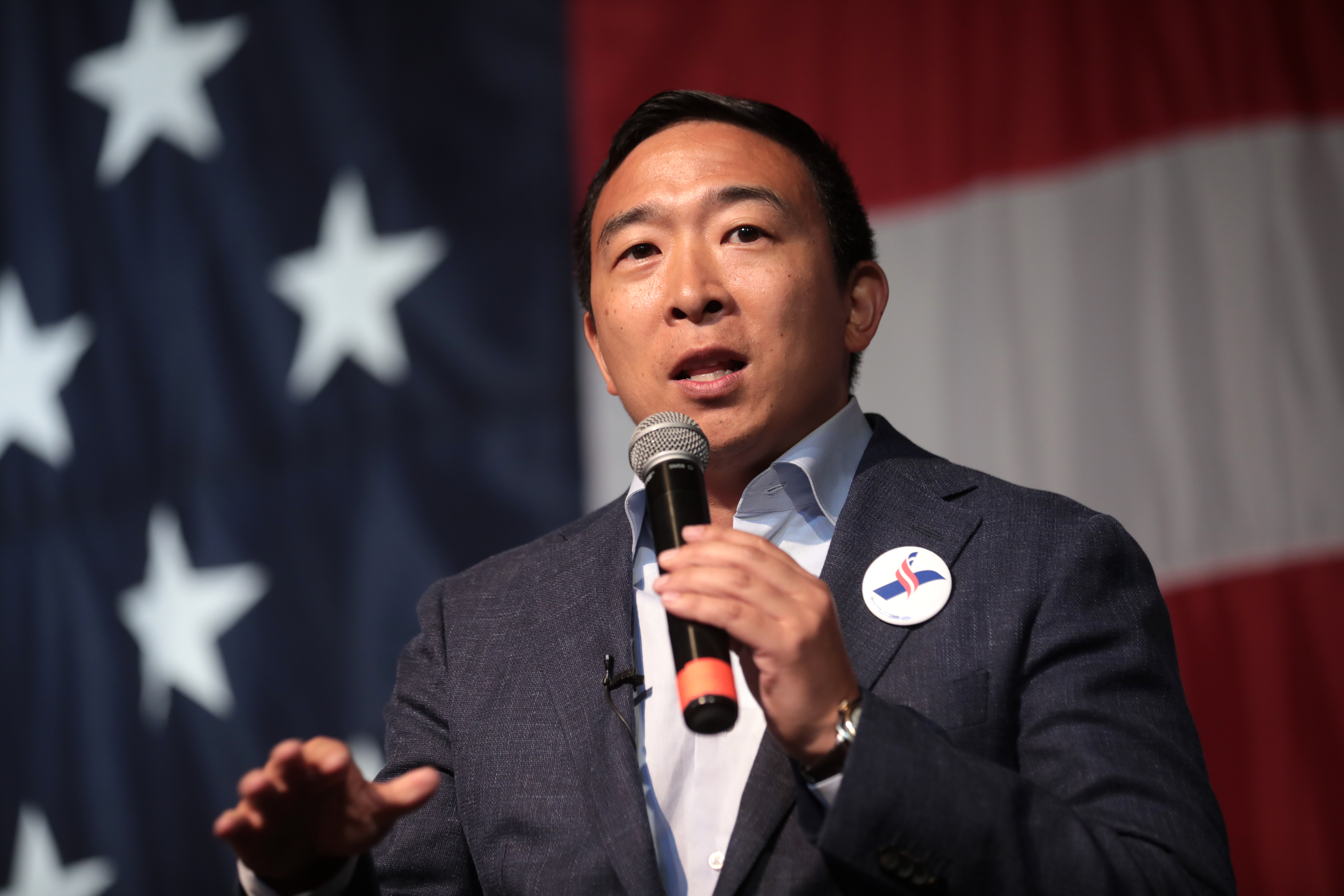
Yang speaks with attendees at the 2019 Iowa Democratic Wing Ding at Surf Ballroom in Clear Lake, Iowa.

In early 2019, Yang's campaign was called a "longshot" by several media outlets, including Fox News, Washington Examiner, and Vox; Yang soon appeared on several noted outlets and podcasts, including The Joe Rogan Experience, The Breakfast Club, The Ben Shapiro Show, and Tucker Carlson Tonight. Yang's appearance on The Joe Rogan Experience in particular has been credited as a major turning point in his campaign. Several media sources also attributed Yang's rise in notability to his large group of online supporters, who informally referred to themselves as the Yang Gang and made a large number of Internet memes about Yang and his campaign.

Following his sudden rise in notability, Yang attracted the interest of some prominent alt-right figures and many users of /pol/, a forum on 4chan that is notorious for its alt-right politics. Yang himself denounced any support from the alt-right. In an interview with The New York Times, Yang said that he is "getting support from quarters [he] wouldn't have expected"; regarding support from the alt-right in particular, he said "It's uncomfortable. They're antithetical to everything I stand for." Yang stated that he was confused by the support he had from the alt-right, because he doesn't "look much like a white nationalist".

=== 2020 ===
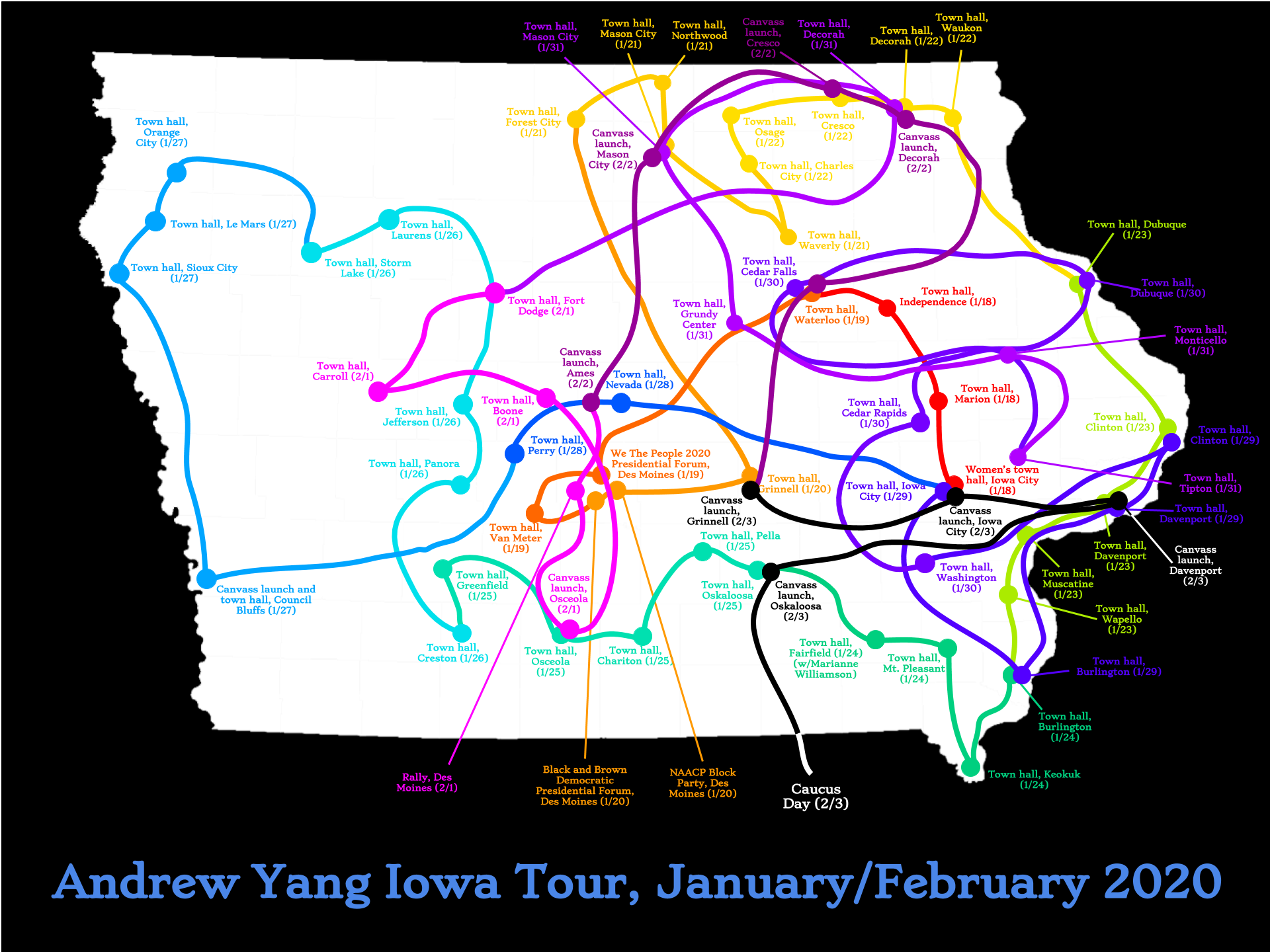
A map of rallies and other events in Iowa that Yang appeared in from January to February 2020 (Note: Not including televised interviews)

After failing to get on the ballot for the March 17 Ohio primary, Yang announced a write-in campaign. He said that his supporters had gathered three times the required signatures, but "because of a bureaucratic paperwork issue caused by an awkwardly-worded law, nearly 3,000 Ohioans' First Amendment rights have been denied." According to Ohio Secretary of State Frank LaRose, "when Ohioans sign a petition, they deserve to know what they're signing. This is why petition forms must be submitted, complete with a statement from the candidate stating their intention to run. By their own admission, the Yang campaign failed to do that."

On January 7, Yang's campaign staff unionized. Evan Low, a member of the California State Assembly, became a national co-chair of Yang's campaign on January 15. On January 23, former Democratic candidate Marianne Williamson announced that she would support Yang in the Iowa caucuses, but noted that it was not an endorsement. Yang responded on Twitter, thanking Williamson and praising her approach. On January 24, she introduced him at a campaign event in Fairfield, Iowa. Additionally, Dave Chappelle performed two comedy shows for Yang's campaign in South Carolina.

According to The Des Moines Register Candidate Tracker, Yang appeared at 78 events in Iowa in January and 14 events in Iowa in February. The Iowa caucus ended without the declaration of a winner due to questions surrounding discrepancies over vote counts. Yang received 8,914 votes in the first alignment in Iowa, which was 5.1% of all votes cast. In the second alignment, Yang received 1,758 votes, which was 1.0% of all votes cast. Yang received 22 state delegate equivalents, which was 1.0% of all state delegate equivalents available. He did not win any delegates to the national convention. Yang's campaign fired 130 staffers in the aftermath of the Iowa caucus. Zach Graumann, Yang's campaign manager, said that the layoffs were part of a "natural evolution" of the campaign after Iowa. A spokesperson for the campaign stated that the layoffs were unrelated to negotiations between the campaign and its unionized workers.

==== End of campaign ====
Yang suspended his campaign on February 11, the night of the New Hampshire primary. Zach Graumann, Yang's campaign manager, stated that Yang no longer believed he had a "real chance to win the nomination", but wanted to have a future in politics. Yang ultimately received 8,318 votes in New Hampshire, which was 2.8% of all votes cast, and did not win any national delegates from the state.

On March 10, 2020, Yang endorsed Joe Biden. While saying he understood the frustration of Bernie Sanders supporters, he referred to Biden as the "prohibitive nominee" and stated that defeating Trump was the most important goal. On April 27, Yang opened a lawsuit against the New York State Board of Elections for removing him and every other inactive candidate from the ballot and effectively canceling New York's presidential primary. Yang praised a federal judge's order to reinstate the primary, saying "I'm glad that a federal judge agreed that depriving millions of New Yorkers of their right to vote was wrong. I hope that the New York Board of Elections takes from this ruling a newfound appreciation of their role in safeguarding our democracy".

== Fundraising ==
On March 11, 2019, Yang announced on Twitter that he surpassed the fundraising threshold of 65,000 donors, which qualified him to participate in the first round of Democratic primary debates. On June 28, Yang announced that he reached 130,000 donors, which met the fundraising criterion for the third round of Democratic primary debates. By November 30, Yang had over 300,000 donors according to his campaign.

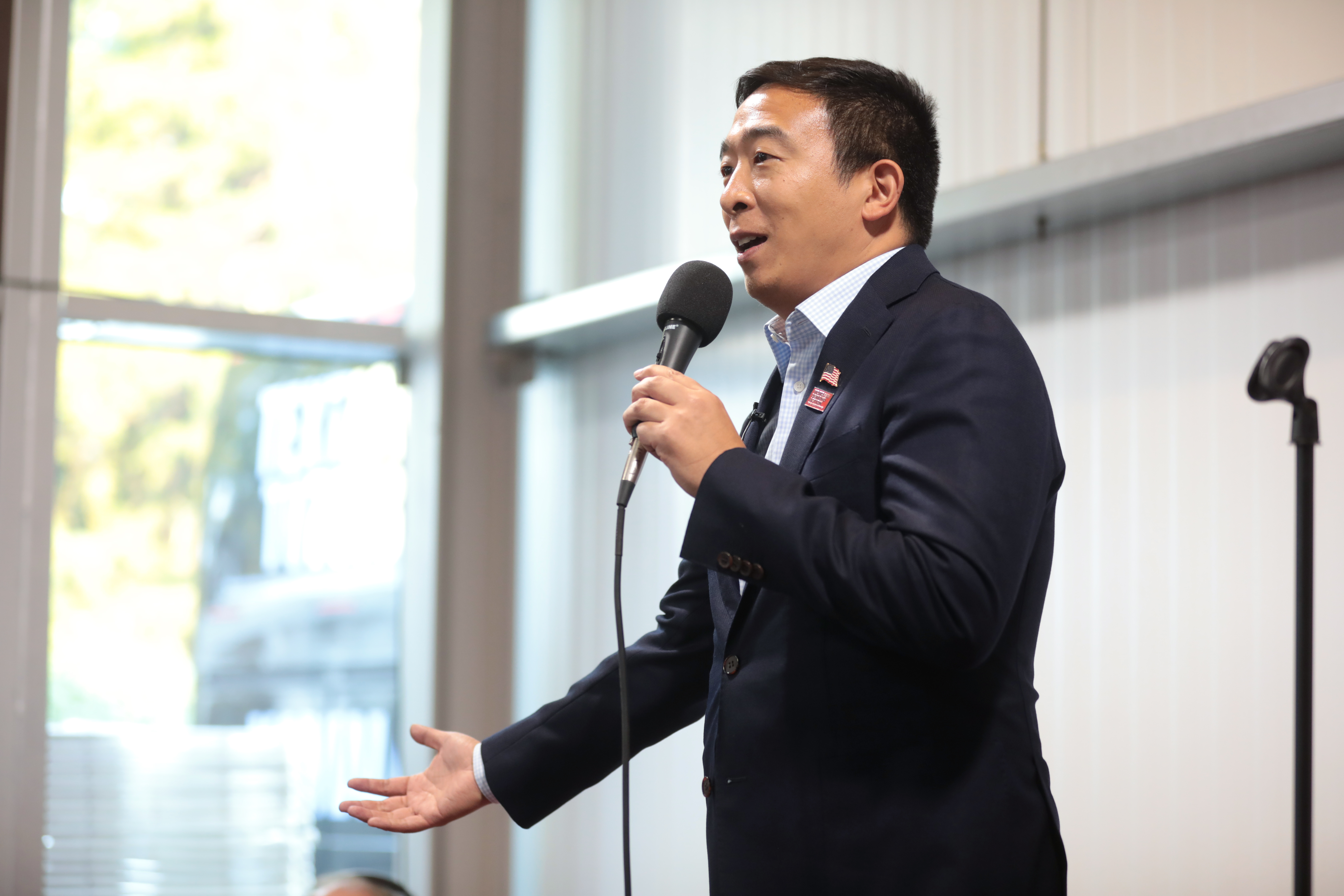
Yang speaking with attendees at a fundraiser hosted by Iowa's Asian and Latino Coalition at Jasper Winery in Des Moines

In the first quarter of 2019, Yang raised $1.7 million, of which more than $250,000 came from "the last four days of the quarter". According to Yang's campaign, "the average donation was $17.92", and "99% of the donations were less than $200". In the second quarter, Yang raised $2.8M, an increase of $1.1M from the first quarter. The campaign stated that 99.6% "of its donors were small-dollar donors [who] gave less than $200". On August 6, Yang's third-quarter fundraising reached $2M, which increased to $2.8M on August 13, matching his total second-quarter fundraising. On August 15, he reached 200,000 unique donors. In the 72 hours after the third debate (held in mid-September), Yang's campaign raised $1 million, suggesting that it "is on track to raise significantly more in the third quarter" than in the second quarter, according to Politico.

In the third quarter, Yang's campaign raised $10M, representing a 257% quarterly increase—the largest growth rate among the fundraising numbers of all candidates. The average donation was around $30, and 99% of the donations were $200 or less. According to The Washington Post, the campaign has raised a total of $15.2M and ranked first among all candidates "in percent of money coming from small-dollar donations".

In mid-October 2019, the creators of a new super PAC, called Math PAC, announced that they would be spending over $1 million to back Yang's campaign "so that a first-time candidate's voice isn't drowned out". Vox noted that it will be "a test for the candidate, who says he wants to eliminate super PACs". On January 2, 2020, Yang's campaign reported that it had raised $16.5 million in the fourth quarter, representing a growth of 65%. On December 31, 2019, the final day of the quarter, the campaign raised $1.3 million in donations, which was its most lucrative fundraising day to date. On February 1, 2020, the campaign announced that it had raised over $6.7 million in January, including $1.2 million raised on January 31 alone.

Yang ultimately raised about $41.6 million over the course of his campaign. Of this amount, about $39.8 million was raised by Yang's campaign committee while the remainder came from outside groups.

== "Yang Gang" ==
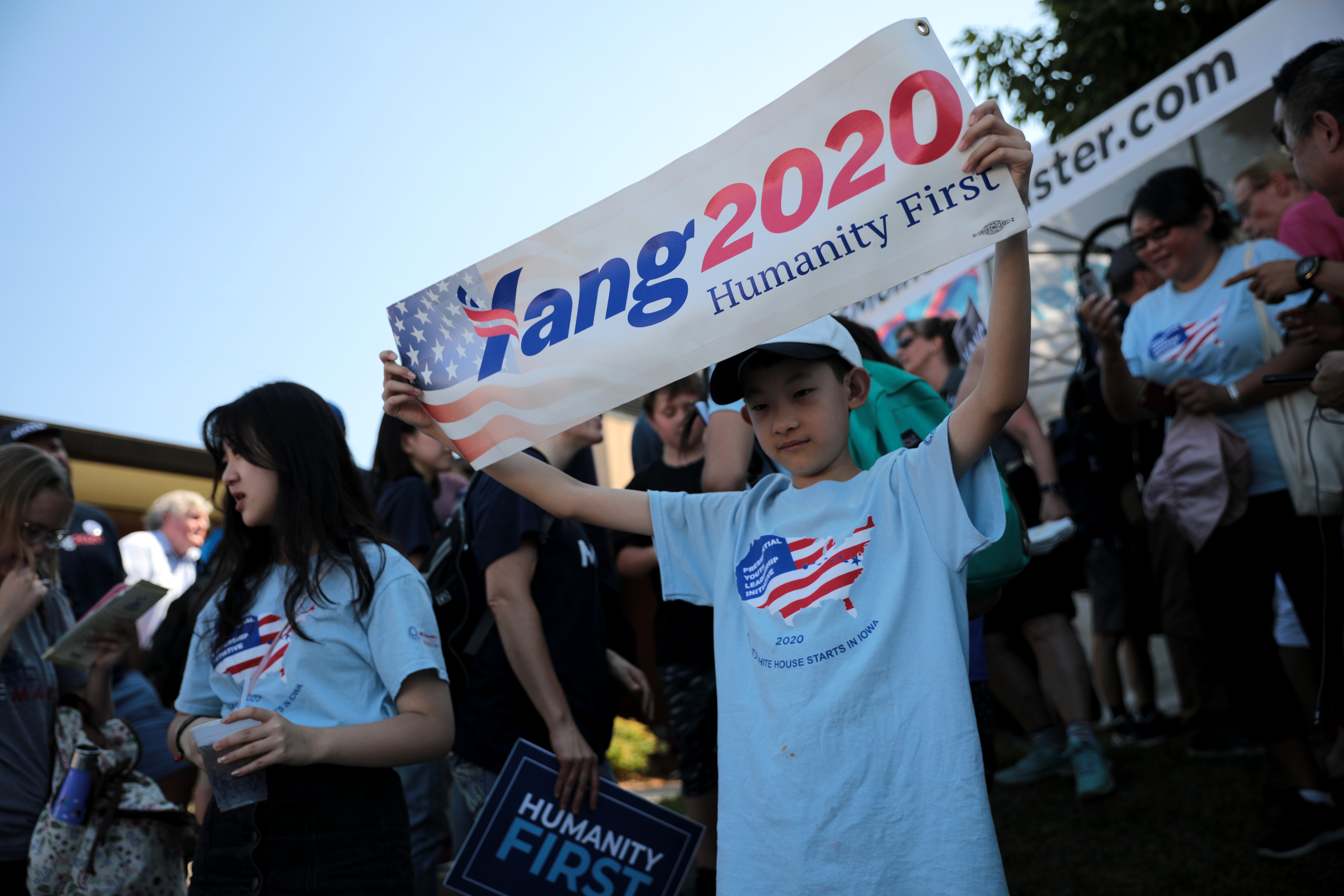
Supporters of Yang's campaign were collectively known as the Yang Gang or #YangGang.

Followers of Yang's campaign were collectively known as the Yang Gang or #YangGang. They brought attention to his campaign on Reddit, 4chan, Facebook, Instagram, Twitter, and other social media platforms, through the use of Internet memes and viral campaigning. Media outlets noted that much of the content circulated through these platforms, such as memes, GIFs, podcasts, and Twitter tweets, were instrumental to Yang's campaign. According to Mother Jones, Yang's supporters coordinated on platforms such as Discord and Reddit in order to boost Yang on online surveys hosted by various websites, including the Drudge Report and Washington Examiner. According to Iowa Starting Line, Yang was able to attract former Republicans, independents, and Libertarians, and Yang believed that "he could build a much broader coalition to beat Trump in 2020 than anyone else in the field".

However, The American Conservative stated that the Yang Gang was largely satirical, with most of the members posting to social media doing so as a critique of corporate communications attempting to be relatable and in touch with younger audiences. The American Conservative further stated that a contingent of Yang's digital followers were only backing him for "a fresh platform for surreal and cynical humor" and that Yang had to denounce part of and distance himself from the movement, which largely stemmed from digital supporters of the Trump 2016 campaign.

In December 2019, FiveThirtyEight found that Yang's base was overwhelmingly young, with 74% of his support coming from individuals under the age of 45. FiveThirtyEight attributed this to the "internet-savvy" nature of Yang's campaign. Most of his supporters under the age of 30 were men, but the gender ratio was closer in older demographics. Yang also received significant support from the Asian American community, placing third among Asian Americans in a Morning Consult poll.

== Media coverage ==
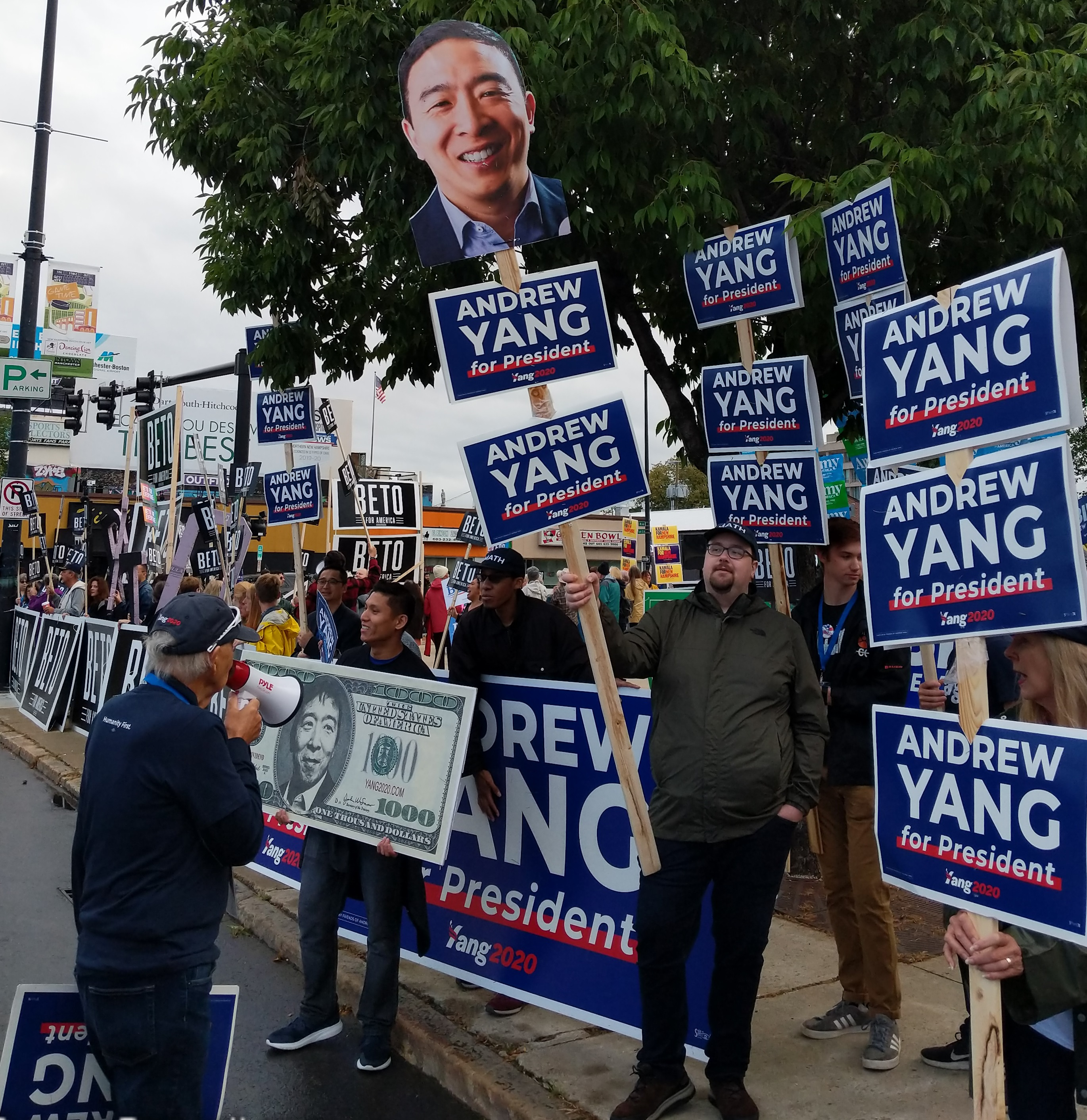
Yang supporters in New Hampshire

On multiple occasions, media outlets such as MSNBC and CNN provided disproportionately low coverage of Yang and excluded Yang from lists of 2020 Democratic candidates. According to The New York Times, he received some of the least coverage in cable news among the candidates, even though he was polling better than most of the field. CNN's Chris Cillizza attributed Yang's lack of coverage to his political inexperience, his "different" policies, and comparisons to Ron Paul, not intentional malice by the media. Axios stated that while Yang was polling in the top six of the Democratic primary and "getting plenty of online attention", he was "being treated by the media like a bottom-tier candidate". Krystal Ball of The Hill stated that there was "a persistent pattern of ignoring Yang's candidacy" among media outlets such as CNN.

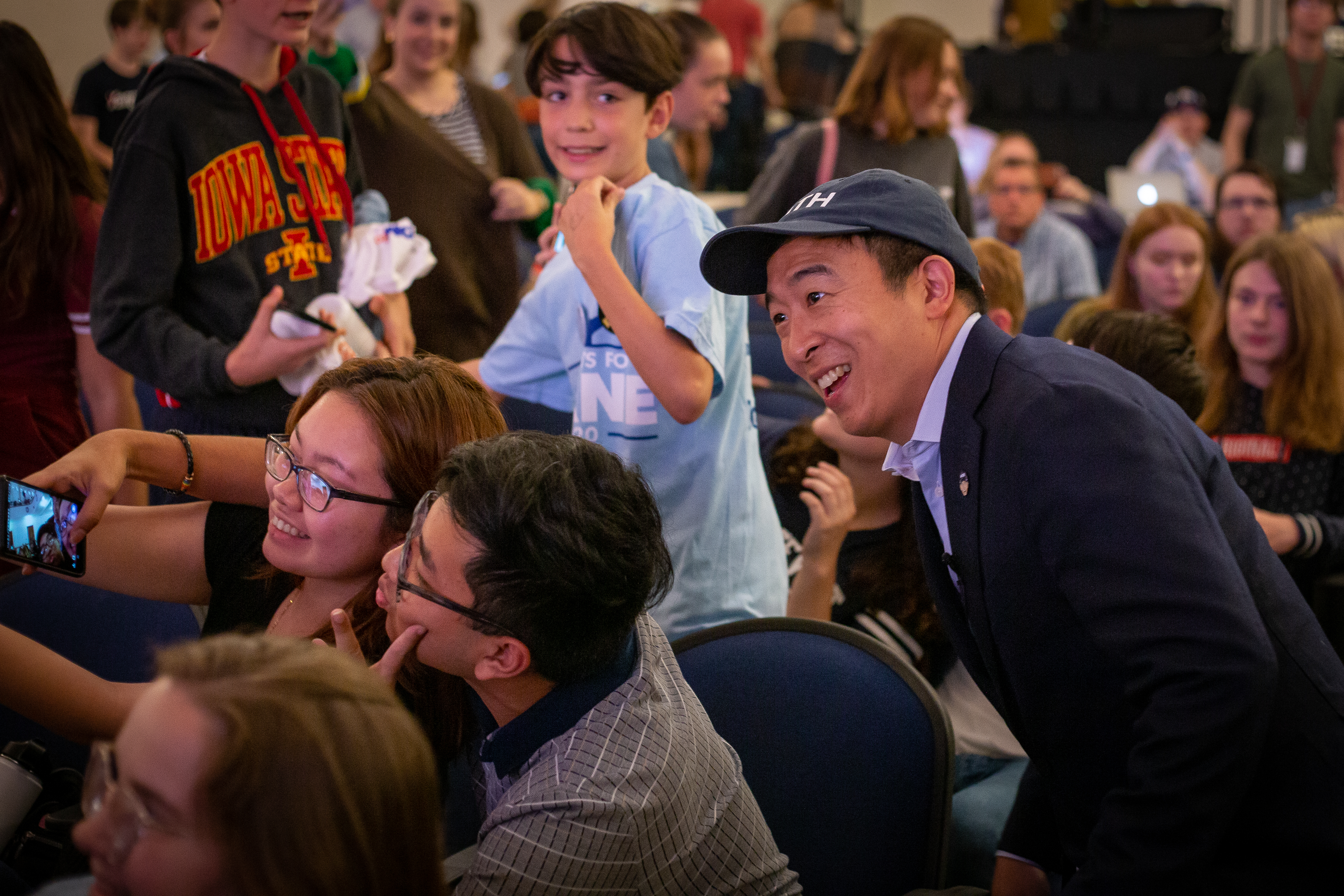
Yang poses for a selfie with supporters in September 2019 at Roosevelt High School in Des Moines.

On September 5, Yang tweeted that "Sometimes honest mistakes happen. But NBC and MSNBC seem to omit me on the regular." In November 2019, Business Insider reported that Yang was faring significantly better than many other Democratic candidates despite a lack of mainstream media coverage. On November 23, 2019, following the MSNBC-hosted November debate in which Yang received the least speaking time and was not called upon for the first 30 minutes of the two-hour debate, Yang publicly rejected a request to appear on MSNBC unless the network would "apologize on-air, discuss and include our campaign consistent with our polling, and allow surrogates from our campaign as they do other candidates'". An analysis from Business Insider found that Yang received significantly less speaking time at debates than would be expected by his polling numbers, and that Yang had the highest deficit between actual and expected speaking time of any candidate during any of the Democratic debates. In a December 2019 interview with NBC News, Yang suggested that him being Asian American may have played a role in the lack of media coverage. According to NBC News, some Yang supporters have "resorted to harassment", including targeting "reporters who have written about or addressed criticisms of Yang", but Yang stated that he did not agree with such behavior. In late December 2019, Yang ended his boycott of MSNBC, stating that he preferred to "speak to as many Americans as possible."

On February 7, The New York Times published an article based on some of the experiences of Yang's former employees. It stated that Yang was insensitive toward race and gender while discussing issues of racism and sexism, and also mentioned examples of his social awkwardness, such as him pressuring employees to participate at company karaokes. Fox News described the article as a "hit piece". On November 22, 2020, former MSNBC producer Ariana Pekary tweeted that Yang was on a list of presidential candidates that the MSNBC show The Last Word with Lawrence O'Donnell was instructed not to interview.

== Democratic primary debates ==
=== 2019 ===
==== First debate ====
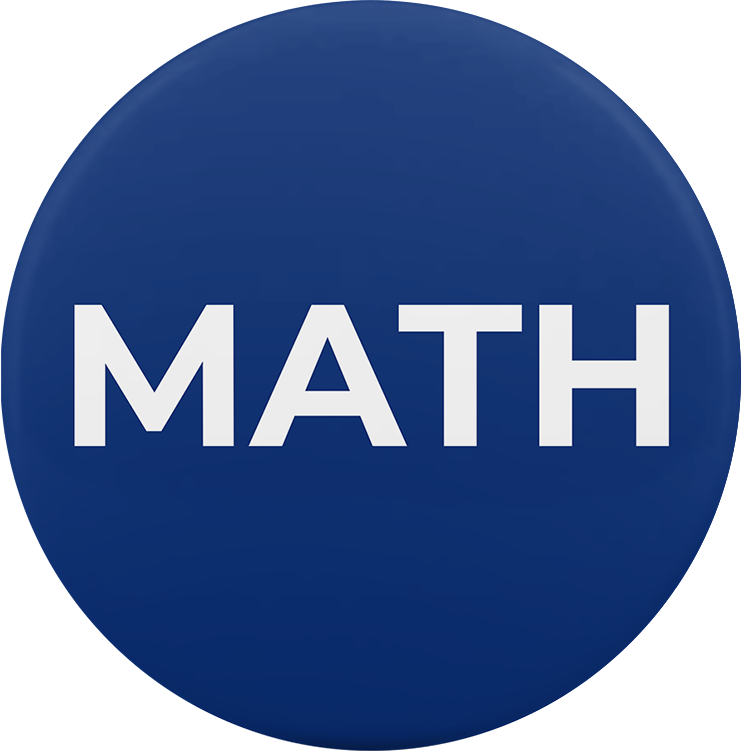
"MATH", which appears on Yang's hat and pin, is an acronym for "Make America Think Harder".

In qualifying for the first Democratic primary debate, Yang met the 65,000 donor criterion on March 11, 2019. He also met the polling criterion, with 18 polls at 1% or higher. The Democratic National Committee determined at random that Yang would participate in the second night of the first debate, which took place in Miami on June 27.

During the debate, Yang was asked only two questions. He had the least airtime of any candidate on both nights, speaking for a total of only two minutes and 56 seconds. After the debate, Yang, along with fellow candidates Marianne Williamson and Eric Swalwell, complained of microphone issues not allowing them to speak unless called upon when other candidates seemed to be able to freely interject at all times, though NBC denied the claim. The issues spurred frustration from Yang supporters and prompted #LetYangSpeak to trend on Twitter much of the following day. An NBC spokesperson said, "At no point during the debate was any candidate's microphone turned off or muted", but Yang and his supporters provided video footage that they said showed Yang speaking up but not being heard.

==== Second debate ====
The criteria for qualifying for the second debates were the same as for the first debates. Yang was assigned to participate in the second night of the second debate, which took place in Detroit on July 31.

During the debate, Yang answered questions on topics including civil rights, health care, immigration, party strategy, climate, and the economy. Yang spoke for a total of 8.7 minutes, which was again the least time of any candidate on both nights. He was the only second-night candidate who did not spend any time in "back-and-forths" with other candidates. Yang drew attention for his decision to not wear a necktie in either debate. In his closing statement, Yang criticized the media and compared the debate format to reality television. Yang's use of the phrase "It's not left, it's not right, it's forward" in his closing statement has been compared to a similar slogan used by the Green Party of Canada and the Dutch political party National Alliance.

==== Third debate ====
To qualify for the third round of debates, "candidates are required to both have 130,000 unique donors and register at least 2 percent support in four polls". On June 28, Yang reached 130,000 donors, thus meeting the fundraising criterion. After Yang had received what he considered to be his fourth qualifying poll, the DNC revealed that qualifying polls conducted by different organizations would not be counted separately if they were sponsored by the same DNC-approved sponsor. The ruling was controversially disclosed by the DNC on July 30, less than one day after Yang had obtained 2% in four polls, rather than on July 19 when the second of these polls had been completed. In spite of this, Yang qualified for the third debate after receiving 2% support in his fourth qualifying poll on August 8. The debate was held in Houston on September 12.

In his opening statement, Yang promised to "give a Freedom Dividend of $1000 a month for an entire year to 10 American families". During the debate, he addressed topics including health care, immigration, foreign relations, the war on terror, corporate lobbying, and education and charter schools. Yang spoke for a total of 7 minutes 54 seconds, which was again the least time of any candidate.

Some campaign-finance experts have questioned using campaign funds for payments such as those Yang promised in his opening statement, on the grounds that federal law bars personal use of campaign funds. However, Yang has said he has consulted lawyers about the proposal and that "he would not gain the same scrutiny if he gave money to a media company or consultants" instead of directly to Americans. On September 12, Reddit co-founder Alexis Ohanian announced on Twitter his support for Yang's proposal and offered to finance it. On September 13, tech entrepreneur Justin Sun pledged to give $1.2 million to 100 Americans in 2020, saying that he wanted "Yang to help him select the recipients". In the 72 hours after the debate, Yang's campaign raised $1 million and collected "more than 450,000 email addresses from people who entered the online raffle", of which over 90% were new email addresses.

==== Fourth debate ====
The qualification requirements for the fourth debate mirrored those of the third debate, and Yang qualified before August 22. The debate was held on October 15 in Westerville, Ohio.

Yang spoke for a total of eight and a half minutes, which was the fourth-least time of all candidates. During the debate, Yang stated his support of impeaching Donald Trump, but that it would not solve the issues that got Trump elected, such as job displacement through automation. He also discussed the economy, taxation, foreign policy, the opioid crisis, big tech, and personal data as a property right. Yang proposed decriminalizing opioids, a stance that candidate Beto O'Rourke agreed with. Candidates Julian Castro and Tulsi Gabbard said that Yang's Freedom Dividend policy "was a good idea, and something they would consider if elected president", while candidate Cory Booker argued for a $15 minimum wage over UBI.

Vox called UBI one of the winners of the debate, saying that Yang's campaign "has already elevated the idea in [American] policy discourse". Chris Cillizza of CNN called Yang one of the winners of the debate, observing that Yang had a "remarkable rise in this race" and "is already having a significant impact on the conversation within the Democratic Party". The New York Post similarly labeled Yang a winner, saying that he "knows how to break through by speaking like a regular person". On Twitter, Meghan McCain praised Yang for starting the conversation on automation, calling it "incredibly impressive".

==== Fifth debate ====
For the fifth debate, participants were required to attain at least 3% support in four national polls and have at least 165,000 individual donors. Yang received his fourth qualifying poll on October 8 after having previously met the donor requirement. The debate was held in Atlanta on November 20.

Yang spoke for a total of 6 minutes 43 seconds, the least time of any candidate. Yang said that climate change and artificial intelligence were among his top priorities. When Yang was asked what he would tell Russian President Vladimir Putin if he was elected, Yang responded that he would tell Putin, "Sorry, I beat your guy."

Critics of the debate noted that it took over 30 minutes for the moderators to let him speak. Yang's short total speaking time and the long period of time before he was brought in sparked accusations from critics, including fellow candidate Tulsi Gabbard, of debate hosts MSNBC and The Washington Post suppressing Yang's speaking time. The incident sparked protests outside of the debate studio from Yang's supporters, who chanted "M-S-N-B-C, hands off our democracy!".

On Twitter, Glenn Greenwald said: "Yang's answer about the actual threats of the 21st century was way too smart, thoughtful and substantive for cable news and presidential political generally. Few things will affect humanity more than Artificial Intelligence in this century." CNN's Chris Cillizza listed Yang as among the debate's winners, saying that he "came across as, by far, the most relatable candidate on the stage". Chris Churchill of Times Union wrote: "The other candidates blabbered on about millionaires and billionaires or the bad man in the White House while Yang, bless his heart, repeatedly turned the focus to families and children." Dana Brownlee of Forbes called Yang's closing statement a "Mic Drop Performance" and "refreshing and riveting".

==== Sixth debate ====
In qualifying for the December debate, Yang met the donor requirement prior to August 15. By December 10, he had received the four required polls, becoming the seventh candidate and the only nonwhite candidate to qualify for the debate. The debate was held on December 19 in Los Angeles, California.

Yang spoke for 10 minutes 56 seconds, the least time of any candidate. He discussed issues including foreign policy, the economy, climate change, impeachment, immigration, human rights, and racial equality. Yang criticized the lack of minority participation in the debate, saying that it was an "honor and disappointment" to be the only nonwhite participant.

CNN's Chris Cillizza named Yang one of the winners of the debate, saying that "Yang's answers on any question he was asked were miles away from how his rivals answered them". Dylan Scott of Vox praised Yang's performance, saying that he "nailed his answer on being the only nonwhite candidate on stage" and that he "made a short and eloquent case" for the Freedom Dividend.

=== 2020 ===
==== Seventh and eighth debates ====
Yang met the donor threshold, but did not meet the polling requirement to qualify for the seventh debate, which occurred on January 14, 2020. Yang suggested that the DNC commission additional polls in an attempt to increase the diversity of candidates, but the committee responded that it would "not sponsor its own debate-qualifying polls of presidential candidates during a primary", citing the established practice of using independent polling for qualification.

On January 26, Yang qualified for the eighth debate, which was held in New Hampshire on February 7. According to editors of The New York Times, Yang gave the second-worst performance of the night. Jamelle Bouie said he "knows how to turn a question to his priorities," but "doesn't have anything to say beyond his pitch for a cash giveaway." Elizabeth Bruenig said he "seems like a cool guy, and perhaps like the ideal candidate ... in a parallel universe where capital and labor cooperate with kindly comity." Will Wilkinson said, "Yang has brought a welcome fresh perspective to the race, but he didn't have his best night."

== Policies ==
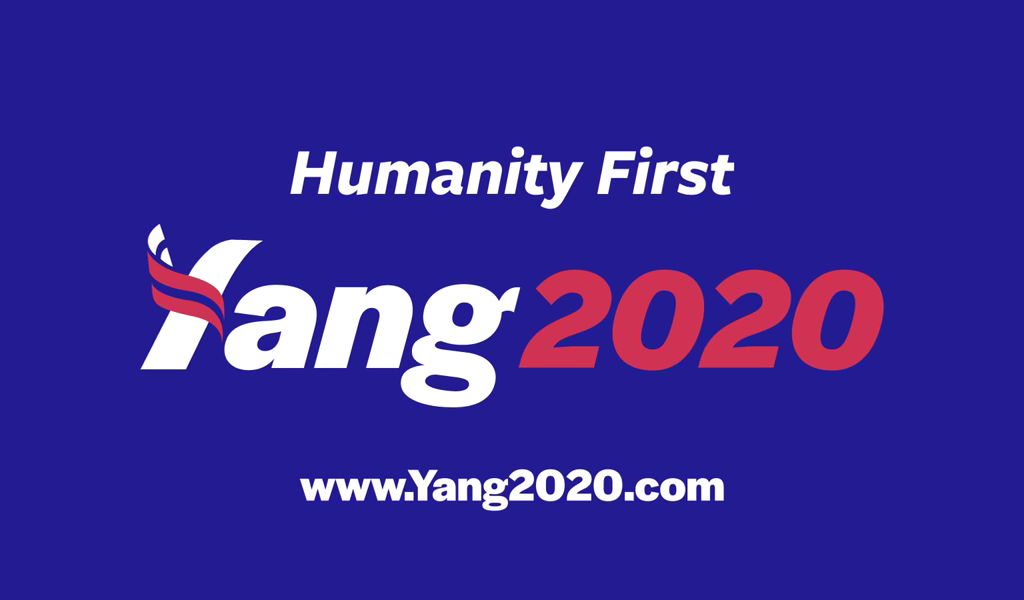
More than 160 policies were listed on Yang's campaign website.

Yang's platform had three main aspects: UBI, "Human-Centered Capitalism" and "Medicare for All", which he "supports the spirit of", but did not commit to. His platform also included numerous other proposals; more than 160 policies were listed on his campaign website.

Yang stated that the problem of job displacement through automation was the main reason Donald Trump ended up winning the 2016 presidential election, stating that based on data, "There's a straight line up between the adoption of industrial robots in a community and the movement towards Donald Trump." Many of his policies, including the Freedom Dividend, were structured as a response to this issue.

=== Freedom Dividend (UBI) ===
Yang's signature policy was the "Freedom Dividend", a $1,000-per-month universal basic income (UBI) to all US citizens age 18 or older, regardless of employment status. Yang stated that this would have helped compensate for the loss of jobs to automation and artificial intelligence and that it would have fostered "healthier people, less stressed out people, better educated people, stronger communities, more volunteerism, [and] more civic participation". Citing forecasting by the Roosevelt Institute, Yang stated that the dividend "would create up to 2 million new jobs" in the US. The dividend would have been opt-in, and would not have been given to those who chose to remain in certain welfare programs, such as Temporary Assistance for Needy Families, the Supplemental Nutrition Assistance Program, WIC, and Supplemental Security Income. Other programs would have stacked on top of the dividend, including Social Security, unemployment insurance, housing assistance, and veteran's disability benefits.

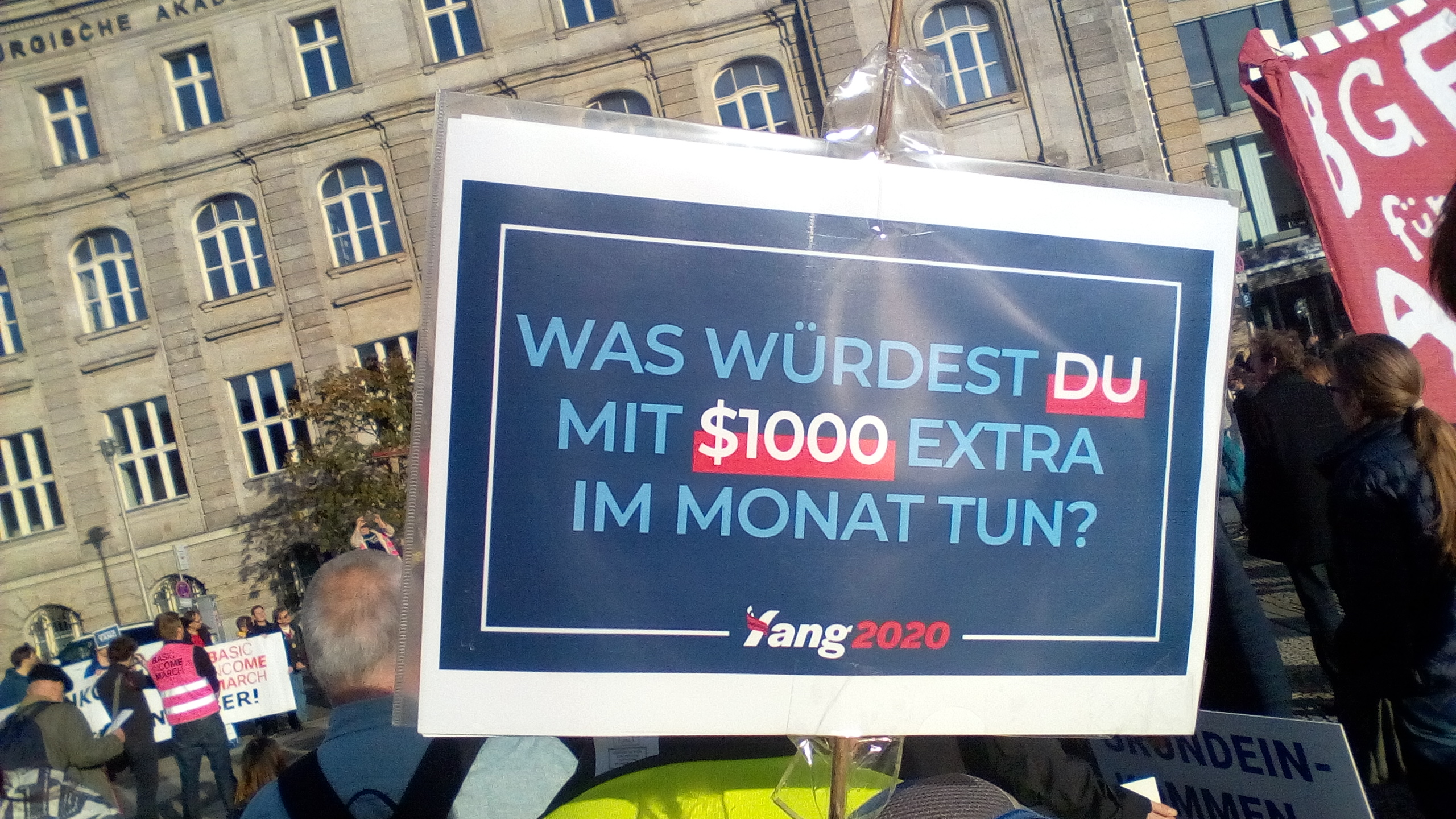
A sign carried by supporters of Yang during a pro-UBI march in Berlin, Germany in 2019. It reads "What would you do with an extra $1000 per month?"

Yang proposed funding the dividend—estimated to cost $2.8 trillion a year—through several avenues, including a 10% value-added tax on business transactions, a 0.1% tax on financial transactions, taxing capital gains and carried interest at normal income rates, a $40/ton carbon tax, and removing the wage cap on Social Security payroll tax. (Note: The Tax Foundation estimates that these five methods would generate $1.3 trillion annually (based on 66% of the GDP). According to Yang, approximately another trillion would be generated by taxes on new economic growth, as well as some people opting out of their current benefits in favor of the dividend.) According to Yang, a value-added tax is necessary to combat tax avoidance by major technology companies like Amazon and Google, which routinely use accounting tricks to pay little in income tax. Yang stated that "hundreds of billions in new economic growth and value" would have been generated through the dividend and that it would have saved billions of dollars on incarceration, homelessness services, and emergency room health care. On the topic of whether the dividend should have included the wealthiest citizens, Yang stated that it should have been universalized "so it's seen as a true right of citizenship, instead of a transfer from rich to poor". Yang did not support raising the federal minimum wage but supported each state's right to do so, remarking that the Freedom Dividend would have rendered a federal minimum wage increase less necessary.

Fellow 2020 Democratic candidates Elizabeth Warren, Tulsi Gabbard, and Julian Castro stated their openness to UBI. At a 2019 conference organized by the Peterson Institute for International Economics, economist and Harvard professor Greg Mankiw said of the Freedom Dividend:

I am attracted to something along the lines of the policy now being championed by Andrew Yang ... It's pretty easy to see how this idea would work. Value-added taxes are essentially sales taxes; they're used in a lot of European nations, and they've proven remarkably efficient ways to raise revenue, and because the dividend is universal, it would be simple to administer.

Skeptics of UBI cite a decrease in the growth of automation and doubt that the impacts of new technology will be negative; according to Rich Lowry, "as technology makes some jobs obsolete, it creates the space for new ones". Contrarily, Yang cited studies demonstrating that the retraining of displaced manufacturing workers had success rates of 0–15%. The National Bureau of Economic Research estimated that the dividend would cost over $3 trillion annually (more than three-fourths of the federal budget). (Note: The Tax Foundation proposes that "A more realistic plan would require reducing the Freedom Dividend to $750 per month and raising the VAT to 22 percent.") Some UBI advocates stated that the Freedom Dividend would have negatively affected low-income citizens; Yang's campaign stated that the cost of basic necessities would not have increased significantly, while the cost of luxury goods would have. Yang's campaign also stated that the dividend would have decreased the amount of time spent "interacting with an unwieldy bureaucracy". Economics professor Melissa Kearney opined that UBI would not significantly reduce inequality, and that she has found "no compelling evidence that ... giving people money will generally lead to any appreciable increase in work or successful business creation".

=== Economy ===
Yang supported "human-centered capitalism", which he stated would have been "geared towards maximising human well-being and fulfillment" instead of corporate profits. Yang criticized several commonly cited economic metrics as misleading; for instance, he prefers labor force participation rate to the unemployment rate and believes that median income and life expectancy are more accurate at measuring the health of the economy than GDP.

Yang called for personal data to be treated as a property right, saying: "Data generated by each individual needs to be owned by them, with certain rights conveyed that will allow them to know how it's used and protect it." He opposed the deregulation of Wall Street, supported regulating social media as a public utility, and promoted a ban on robocalls. Yang proposed a new type of credit system designed to incentivize traditionally unpaid caregiving contributions. He supported free financial counseling, stating that "it's important to ensure Americans have the knowledge they need to save and invest properly". Yang criticized the economic and environmental impacts of the penny and supported ending production of the coin.

=== Electoral reform ===
Yang supported the implementation of what he called "democracy dollars", wherein voting age citizens would have received a $100 "use it or lose it" democracy voucher each year to give to candidates. The policy aimed to counteract corporate donations resulting from political lobbying and the decision of Citizens United v. FEC. According to Yang, democracy dollars would have drowned out money from organizations like the National Rifle Association of America by a factor of eight to one.

Yang was a proponent of ranked-choice voting, supporting New York City's implementation of the practice and expressing a desire for it to be "the norm" nationwide. On April 3, 2019, Yang came out in favor of lowering the national voting age to 16. While other candidates expressed openness towards the idea, Yang was the first to make it an official part of his platform.

Equal Citizens gave Yang's democracy reform policies an "A+" rating, which is the highest possible ranking.

=== Energy and climate change ===
On August 26, 2019, Yang released his climate change plan, which involved nuclear power, zero-emission transportation, geoengineering, a carbon tax, and a renewable electric grid. Yang supported a Green New Deal and favored a reduction in carbon emissions with an emphasis on climate engineering. In addition to revitalizing the Environmental Protection Agency, his platform called for a Global Geoengineering Institute to form inter-governmental partnerships. Yang was a proponent of bringing the United States back into the Paris Climate Agreement.

=== Healthcare ===
In addition to UBI and human-centered capitalism, single-payer healthcare was initially a fundamental aspect of Yang's platform. However, his policy proposal released in December 2019 eschewed from it in favor of a plan that focused more on lowering costs and expanding coverage. Prior to releasing the proposal, Yang clarified that while he supported Medicare for All, he "would keep the option of private insurance". He stated his goal was to "demonstrate to the American people that private insurance is not what [they] need" and that Medicare for All is "superior to [their] current insurance". He believed that such an approach would make holistic and preventive care more feasible. He also used to support free marriage counseling. His policy proposal did not contain a public option. HuffPost described it as "the most conservative health care plan in the Democratic Primary".

In March 2019, after an anonymous Twitter user asked Yang if he had an opinion on routine infant circumcision, Yang responded that he was against the practice. Yang later called himself "highly aligned with the intactivists" ("intactivists" referring to opponents of the practice) and stated that "history will prove them even more correct." Yang called the evidence for circumcision being medically beneficial "shaky" and suggested that as president, he would support giving new parents more information about this decision. However, Yang did not support a ban on the practice and later clarified that he supported the ability of parents to make this choice for religious or cultural reasons. Intactivists described this position as incompatible with their movement, with Intact America's Georganne Chapin describing his statement as backtracking and suggesting that it was simply due to political pressure. Major politicians commenting on infant circumcision has been rare, with Yang being the only candidate for the 2020 Democratic presidential nomination to discuss the issue.

=== Abortion ===
Yang is pro-choice. He supports "the right to privacy of American women" and the right for women "to choose in every circumstance and provide resources for planning and contraception". He said that he would have nominated pro-choice judges who "support a woman's right to choose".

=== Corruption and bureaucracy ===
Yang supported creating two new Cabinet positions, with one being responsible for cybersecurity while the other would have emphasized the "attention economy" and focused on regulating the addictive nature of social media. He also proposed hiring a White House Psychologist to focus on mental health issues. To stem corruption, Yang supported increasing the salaries of federal regulators but limiting their private work after they leave public service. He also supported cutting the number of federal employees by 15–20%.

=== Drug policy ===
Yang supported the legalization of cannabis and the decriminalization of opioids (including heroin) for personal use, but he did not support legalizing or decriminalizing cocaine. He cited the drug policy of Portugal, which he believes to be similar, as evidence of the potential effectiveness of his drug policy. He stated that he would have pardoned all prisoners serving sentences for low-level, non-violent marijuana offenses had he been elected. Yang tweeted that the United States "should explore making psilocybin mushrooms legal for medical and therapeutic use particularly for veterans".

=== Gun control ===
Yang supported "common sense licensing policy" for firearms, the implementation of universal background checks to restrict the ability of people with a history of violence, domestic abuse, or violent mental illness to acquire firearms, and the offering of financial incentives for smart guns. Yang also proposed a ban on assault weapons.

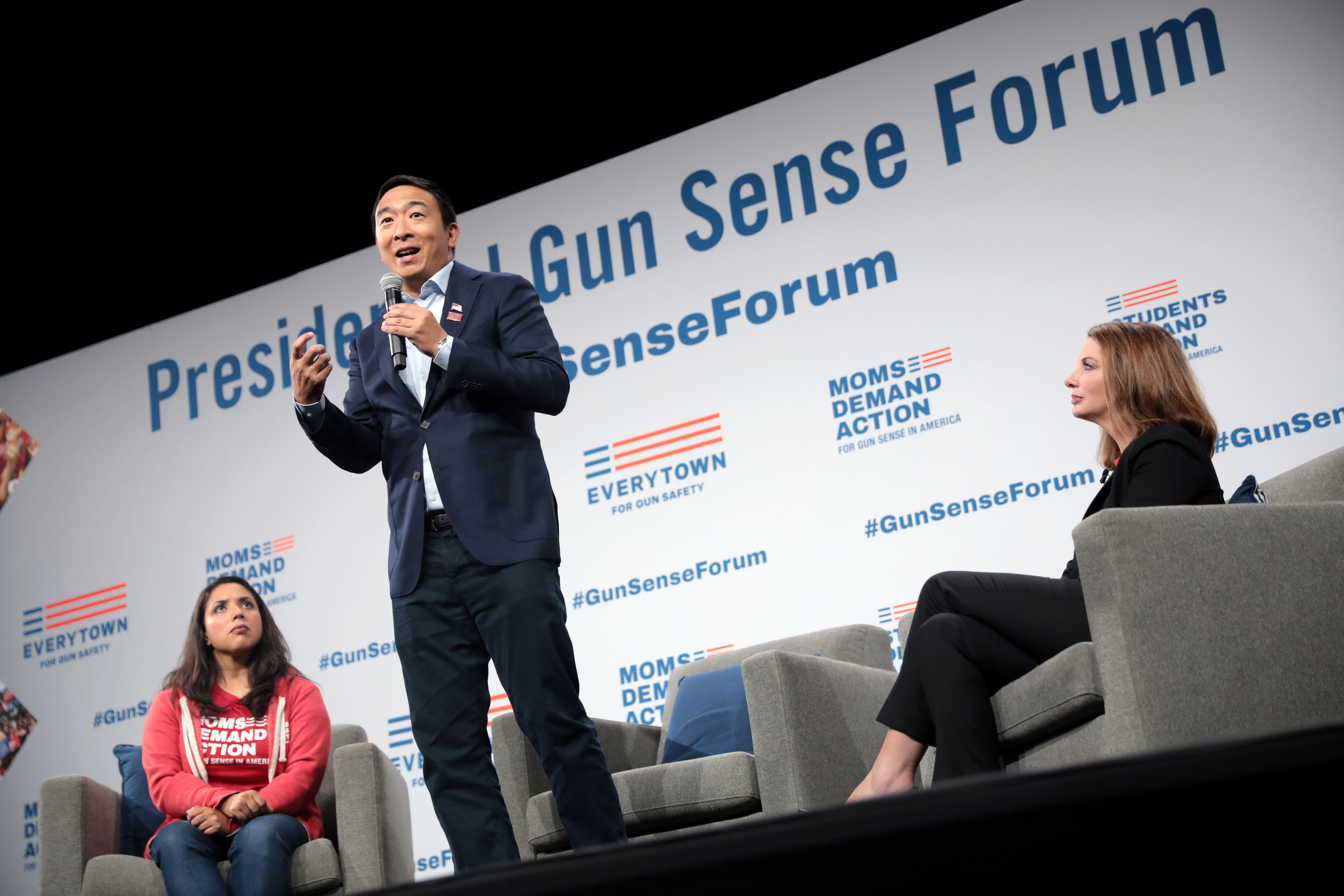
Yang speaks at the Presidential Gun Sense Forum in Iowa.

Yang advocated for gun companies to "pay a fine when their product is used to kill an American" in order to realign incentives to deal with the problem of arms manufacturers' stocks going up after mass shootings. He supports "an increase in the availability of mental health resources". Yang called the act of buying a gun and using it in a mass shooting "the last two steps" for a mass shooter and stated that the US must also tackle the various steps that cause a shooter to buy and use a gun in a mass shooting in the first place.

Yang proposed ending active shooter drills in U.S. schools, or making them optional. He argued that "the trauma and anxiety the process causes far outweigh the likelihood of a real-life shooting", citing a statistic that "the likelihood of a public school student being killed by a gunman is 'less than 1 in 614 million'". He also "criticized several school districts across the country which use theatrical recreations including firing blank rounds at students and using fake blood to imitate a real mass shooting".

=== Foreign policy ===
Yang supported American international alliances, including NATO. He stated that he would have repealed the Authorization for Use of Military Force and returned the power to initiate wars to Congress.

Yang supported a two-state solution to the Israeli–Palestinian conflict. He called Iran a "destabilizing force", but opposed engaging in an armed conflict with the country and stated that leaving the Iran nuclear deal was a "strategic mistake". He referred to the War in Afghanistan as a "forever war" and supported withdrawing combat troops from the country; however, he emphasized that he would have supported the Islamic Republic of Afghanistan through diplomatic and economic means. Yang also called for a "reset of the relationship with Saudi Arabia" due to the country's actions in Yemen and its role in the assassination of Jamal Khashoggi.

Yang backed a more aggressive policy toward Russia, saying that "Russia is our biggest geopolitical threat, because they've been hacking our democracy successfully." He supported expanding sanctions against Russia via the Magnitsky Act in order to counter "Russian expansionism". He also proposed strengthening security coordination with Ukraine to protect the country from Russia.

Yang supported Juan Guaidó's claim to the Venezuelan presidency during the Venezuelan presidential crisis. Yang condemned the 2018 Venezuelan presidential election as "marred by fraud, intimidation, and voter suppression" and expressed a desire for Nicolás Maduro to step down as president. Yang opposed removing Maduro from office with military force; he instead proposed putting diplomatic pressure and sanctions on Maduro and his associates.

=== Higher education ===
Yang did not support making public colleges tuition-free, but did support investing in community colleges to drastically reduce their tuition. Yang proposed forgiving some student loan debt, improving efficacy of funds invested in education, and increasing the accountability of educational institutions. He supported affirmative action, believing that there has "never been a truly objective process" for college admissions, owing to "preference for legacies". He said that he viewed the rising cost of tuition as one of the greatest issues facing higher education. He identified an increase in administration staff as the cause of the rising cost, and supported tying federal fund access to affordability and accessibility to curb the excess.

=== Immigration ===
Yang supported the DREAM Act, a bill that would protect migrants who entered the United States illegally as minors. He proposed creating a new category of residency that would allow certain undocumented migrants to gain citizenship after 18 years in the country. He advocated for increased financial support for ports of entry and environmental protections around the Rio Grande and stated that he would have used technology to secure the Mexico–United States border. Yang said that immigrants were being scapegoated for the problem of job displacement through automation, stating that "If you go to a factory here in Michigan, you will not find wall-to-wall immigrants, you will find wall to wall robots and machines."

=== LGBT rights ===
Yang promised to enact legislation that would prevent discrimination based on sexual orientation or gender identity. He believes that "the protections of the Civil Rights Act should apply to LGBTQ+ Americans".

=== Infrastructure ===
Yang proposed creating a "Legion of Builders and Destroyers", headed by a "Commander", that would have performed upkeep on infrastructure as well as combat urban decay by destroying blighted buildings. The Legion would have been authorized to ignore local ordinances if they conflicted with Legion activities. Yang proposed redirecting 10% of the budget of the United States Armed Forces towards the Legion.
