= Winx Health =

American women's health company

Winx Health (formerly Stix) is an American women's health company based in Philadelphia, Pennsylvania. Founded in 2019 as a seller of direct-to-consumer pregnancy tests, the company has expanded to offering other vaginal and women's health care products, including UTI and vaginal infection tests and treatments.

== History ==
Winx Health was founded in 2019 by Jamie Norwood and Cynthia Plotch as a direct-to-consumer reproductive health brand under the name Stix.

In June 2022, the same week that the U.S. Supreme Court overturned Roe v. Wade, Winx launched an emergency contraception product and donated more than 30,000 free doses of emergency contraception.

In June 2024, the company rebranded from Stix to Winx Health, reflecting its expanded portfolio beyond pregnancy tests and signaling a broader health identity. The rebrand included updated packaging, refreshed visual identity, and continued emphasis on education through its "Real Talk" content hub, which had become a significant driver of organic traffic.

In September 2025, Winx Health announced a nationwide retail launch at Walgreens, making its products available in 7,000 drugstores across the United States. The initial rollout included seven offerings: Restart Morning-After Pill, Early Pregnancy Test, Vaginal Health Test + Treat, Vaginal Health Probiotic, UTI Test + Treat, UTI Fast-Acting Pain Relief, and UTI Daily Defense. The expansion marked a significant milestone in the company's distribution strategy, broadening access to its over-the-counter reproductive and urinary health products.

== Products ==
Winx Health offers a range of over-the-counter health products focused on reproductive, sexual, and urinary wellness. Its product categories include:

- Pregnancy testing – Early detection pregnancy tests.
- Emergency contraception – Restart Morning-After Pill.
- Vaginal health – Vaginal Health Test + Treat, Vaginal Health Probiotic.
- UTI care – UTI Test + Treat, UTI Fast-Acting Pain Relief, UTI Daily Defense.

All Winx products are developed in collaboration with OB-GYNs and urologists, and are manufactured in compliance with FDA standards. The company is women-owned, and its Restart Morning-After Pill is noted as the only emergency contraception brand in the United States founded and owned by women.

The company also produces educational content under the brand Real Talk, which provides medically reviewed information on women's health, sex education, and reproductive rights.

== Retailers ==
Winx Health products are sold in more than 7,000 Walgreens stores across the United States. They are also available in grocery retailers including GIANT in Pennsylvania and Hannaford in the Northeastern United States.

In addition to in-store retail, Winx products can be purchased through on-demand delivery services such as Gopuff, DoorDash, Instacart, and Uber Eats.

== Recognition and awards ==
In October 2024, Time magazine named Winx's "UTI Test & Treat" product as one of the 200 Best Inventions of the year.

Founders Jamie Norwood and Cynthia Plotch have been recognized individually on lists including Forbes 30 Under 30, Inc.'s Female Founders 500, and AdAge Breakout Brand Leaders.

== Founders ==
Winx Health was co-founded by Jamie Norwood and Cynthia Plotch. Both are alumni of Venture for America and participated in the Entrepreneur Roundtable Accelerator program in New York.

== Investors ==
The actress Kerry Washington is an investor and advisor. Discussing her work with Winx, she told People magazine, "The ability to really know ourselves and take care of ourselves allows us to love ourselves and to live empowered lives of choice as women."

== See also ==
- Emergency contraception in the United States
- Over-the-counter drug
- Sex education in the United States
- Vaginal health
- Urinary tract infection
- Femtech
