= Clue (mobile app) =

Menstrual health app

- Developer: BioWink GmbH
- Release: 2013
Stable release
- Android: 37.1 / March 25, 2021; 5 years ago
- iOS: 30.0 / March 17, 2021; 5 years ago
- Operating system: iOS, Android & Apple Watch
- Available in: 15 languages
- List of languages English, Danish, French, German, Hindi, Italian, Japanese, Korean, Polish, Portuguese, Russian, Simplified Chinese, Spanish, Traditional Chinese, Turkish
- Type: Period-tracking and fertility app
- Website: www.helloclue.com

Biowink GmbH
- Key people: Audrey Tsang; (co-CEO); Carrie Walter; (co-CEO)

Clue is a menstrual health app developed by the Berlin-based technology company BioWink GmbH. The app has over 15 million users from 180 countries. The startup has raised over $17 million from backers that include Union Square Ventures and Mosaic Ventures. Clue is women-led, having been co-founded by Ida Tin, who coined the term "Femtech," and is currently led by CEO Rhiannon White.

The company describes itself as the "#1 women-led period and cycle tracker."

== History ==
Clue was co-founded by Ida Tin, Hans Raffauf, Mike LaVigne and Moritz von Buttlar in 2012. BioWink GmbH launched the app in 2013. Ida Tin's stated goal was to take female reproductive health “out of taboo land” and to start “a reproductive health revolution.” Tin previously led motorbike tours around the world and wrote a book about her experience.

By July 2017, the Clue app had more than 8 million active users on both Android and iOS. Users were representative of more than 180 countries. In 2015, BioWink GmbH closed a $7 million Series A funding round led by Union Square Ventures and Mosaic Ventures, bringing the company's total funding to $10 million. The company was listed as one of Europe's Hottest Startups in 2015 by Wired UK, with Clue being named one of the best apps in 2015 by both Apple and Google.

In March 2018, the company launched an editorial site to serve as a resource for accessible and scientific menstrual health information.

== Mobile app ==
The Clue mobile application calculates and predicts a user's period, fertile window, and premenstrual syndrome. It also informs users the most or least likely time for becoming pregnant and allows them to track more than 30 health categories, including sex, sleep, pain, exercise, hair, skin, digestion, emotions and energy. The app can also explain how pill dosages impact fertility and includes an alarm system to allow for reminders for taking pills.

In 2015, the company closed a Series A funding round and announced plans to use the proceeds to expand features of the mobile app and hire more staff. Clue also partnered with universities such as Stanford University, Columbia University, University of Washington, and University of Oxford to advance female health research.

Clue integrated with Apple Inc.'s HealthKit for iOS 9 in September 2015, allowing data such as body temperature, cervical mucus quality, menstruation, ovulation test results, sexual activity, and spotting directly to the app.

In February 2018, Clue made its app available on the Fitbit Ionic smartwatch.

In 2026, Clue partnered with UK-based digital healthcare platform Evaro, an NHS-licensed provider, to offer embedded prescription services within the app.
