= Ava (company) =

- Type: Private company
- Headquarters: Zürich, San Francisco
- Key people: Lea Von Bidder (co-founder and President), Pascal Koenig (co-founder and CEO) and Peter Stein (co-founder)
- Website: avawomen.com

Ava is a medical technology company that developed the Ava bracelet, a wearable device that functions as a fertility tracker.

== History ==
The company was founded in Zürich, Switzerland by Lea Von Bidder, Pascal Koenig, Philipp Tholen, and Peter Stein. In September 2015, the company took part in TechCrunch’s Startup Battlefield. In November 2015, Ava raised a $2.6 million funding round led by Swisscom and ZKB. The company began shipping the Ava bracelet to customers in July 2016. The company raised nearly $40 million in funding between 2017 and 2018.

In 2022, Ava was acquired by FemTech Health out of Houston, TX.

== Technology ==
The device is intended to allow wearers to estimate their fertile window by tracking their menstrual cycle and ovulation based on measurements of their skin temperature, heart rate, perfusion, breathing rate, and heart rate variability. Data collected from the bracelet is displayed on an app, so that the wearer can track their fertility or monitor their health during pregnancy. According to data from a clinical study at the University Hospital of Zurich, it predicts fertility with 89% accuracy. An independent study of the bracelet's validity found that it provided accurate assessments of sleep duration but that its estimates of other data such as heart rate were inaccurate in comparison to other monitoring methods such as actigraphy.
