= Union Square Ventures =

American venture capital firm

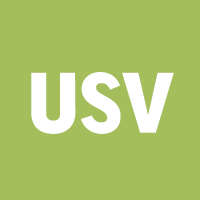
- Company type: Private
- Founded: 2003; 23 years ago
- Headquarters: New York City, New York, US
- Founders: Fred Wilson; Brad Burnham
- Key people: Albert Wenger; Andy Weissman
- Industry: Venture Capital, startups
- Website: usv.com

Union Square Ventures (USV) is an American venture capital firm based in New York City. The firm has backed more than 130 startups, including Twitter, Etsy, Stripe, Coinbase, Zynga, Tumblr, Stack Overflow, Meetup, Kickstarter, MongoDB, Flurry, Cloudflare, Duolingo, Soundcloud, Clue, and Carta.

== History ==
Union Square Ventures (USV) was founded in 2003 by Fred Wilson and Brad Burnham. They created USV with the intent of investing in and fostering the development of early-stage companies. Their investments are "mostly U.S.-based Internet and mobile companies considered to be ‘disruptive’".

USV is regularly included in Red Herring’s lists of top venture capital firms. As of 2016, USV had 7x one billion plus dollar exits, including Twitter in 2013 and Twilio in 2016. USV's 2004 fund is one of the best-performing venture capital funds in history. In 2011 USV was chosen as the best-performing venture capital firm the United States, based on investment return rate.

In 2007, Albert Wenger, the former president of del.icio.us, joined the firm as a managing partner. In 2011, Betaworks co-founder Andy Weissman joined USV. In 2018, Rebecca Kaden, previously a General Partner at Maveron joined USV. In 2019, USV announced two new partners–Gillian Munson, formerly the CFO of XO Group, and Nick Grossman, who had previously worked at USV on special projects such as policy and crypto. In 2021, Samson Mesele, previously a corporate attorney at Wachtell, Lipton, Rosen & Katz, joined USV as general counsel and partner.
