= Femtech =

Technology tailored towards women's health

Femtech (or female technology) is a term used to define software and services that use technology tailored towards women's health. Femtech includes menstruation care (such as period-tracking apps and menstrual products), as well as fertility and reproductive system healthcare, pregnancy and nursing care, and sexual health.

The term "femtech" was coined in 2016 for the menstrual health app Clue. Femtech applications come in several different forms, such as mobile apps and medical devices.

== Companies and products ==
There are numerous femtech companies offering a variety of different products throughout the world, such as Clue, DOT, Glow, Eve, Cycles, My Calendar, Life, FertilityIQ, Extend Fertility, Forte Medical, Flo, Lady Cycle and others. Companies that offer services like IVF, egg freezing, and medical treatments include Univfy, Progyny, Inc. Apricity, Winx Health, and Prelude Fertility. Valley Electronics created the original fertility tracking tech device, called the Lady-Comp fertility tracker, which was first produced in Germany in 1986 and has a modernized model still on the market in addition to a newer variant of fertility tracking device called the Daysy fertility tracker, which was the first device to pair a fertility tracker with an app. Similarly, the fertility company, Ava, produces a wearable that tracks fertility.

Several companies also produce internet-connected medical devices that are often paired with mobile apps to track specific data. For instance, Elvie and Willow produce a wearable breast pump. The Elvie breast pump also connects to an app. Elvie also offers a kegel-tracking device. In 2020, Kegg launched a 2-in-1 fertility tracker that senses electrolyte levels of cervical fluid and assists the user in pelvic floor exercises. Lioness produces a smart vibrator with an app that uses biofeedback to help users learn more about their bodies. Other medical devices and implements produced in the femtech category may or may not use an internet connection. Joylux is a women's health technology company creating medical and feminine wellness devices under the vSculpt and vFit brands. Companies like L. and Flex offer alternatives to standard tampon and condom products. Thinx sells reusable period underwear that absorbs menstrual blood.

Swedish company Natural Cycles was the first to receive official approval to market its app as digital contraception in the European Union and in August 2018, the Food and Drug Administration approved marketing in the U.S. Controversy around the app as a contraceptive device grew stronger after numerous women in Stockholm reported unplanned pregnancies after using the app. After Swedish authorities concluded the investigation, the amount of unintended pregnancies was found to be in line with claims made by Natural Cycles.

Companies in the breastfeeding and breast-pumping space like Milk Stork provide services such as breast milk shipping.

== Ethics ==
There have been concerns about data-sharing practices in femtech, particularly within fertility-trackers. This issue has affected several applications outside of femtech, but due to the sensitivity of the data being shared within femtech, it becomes more urgent. In the aftermath of the overturning of Roe v. Wade and the laws passed by states banning abortion, there was a widespread fear femtech would be weaponized to monitor women and whether or not they get an abortion. Some apps have come under fire for ambiguous privacy ethics after it emerged that user data had been shared without consent with companies such as Facebook. This allowed Facebook, and other companies that it shares its data with, to target users with fertility or pregnancy related products based around which point in their monthly menstrual cycle they were. Flo, a period tracking app which collects personal data from users, has also sold that data and attempted to conceal who it was sold to. After FCC intervention, Flo is no longer able to conceal what they do with data from users and must ask for their consent if they want to share their data. However, though Flo was stopped, companies such as Facebook and other period-tracking apps continue to share user data. Some have argued this is harmful, as it assumes things such as intended eventual pregnancy and disregards alternate conception outcomes such as termination or miscarriage. There have been additional concerns about femtech apps reporting false information regarding users' reproductive health. While the intention behind femtech is to give visibility to women's health and empower women, there have been several issues with femtech perpetuating social inequalities, such as sexist stereotypes, going against their original goal. Feminists who have studied femtech closely came to conclusion that rather than empowering women, it is exploiting the anxieties women have when it comes to their health. The main issues are medical reliability, privacy, gender stereotyping and epistemic injustice. Proposals to combat data-sharing practices have arisen through the use of ethics-by-design tools that stem from the capability sensitive design (CSD) framework. However, it is more of a theoretical framework rather than a permanent solution. There has yet to be a permanent solution presented.

== Accessibility and inclusivity issues ==
While there are several advantages to femtech, it is not accessible to all women, specifically women in low-income countries—over 44 million women in those countries lack access to the services offered. Period-tracking apps, for example, assume users have cellphones to download and use their applications. When it comes to the digital health, only 3% of the deals made by digital health investors were focused on women's health, while the rest of that focus went to men's health. With women's health already not being prioritized, femtech reframing itself to consider women globally is becoming a necessity. To close that gap, "e-hybrid" prenatal care has been proposed, which will allow flexibility in providing services to pregnant women and the kind of care that they need, specifically for women in low-income countries. However, it is mainly a potential model rather than a solid solution, with many obstacles to overcome before it could actually be implemented. Femtech could start to move in the direction of operating in a global context in the meantime, though it could be some time before that happens.
