= Venture for America =

American nonprofit organization (2011–2024)

Venture for America, Inc.
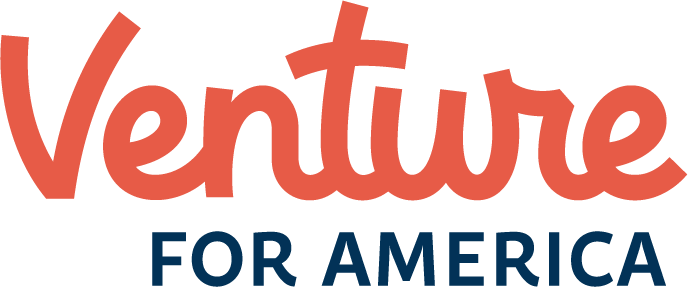
- Founded: July 20, 2011; 15 years ago
- Founder: Andrew Yang
- Dissolved: 2024
- Type: Nonprofit organization
- Purpose: Creating economic opportunity through entrepreneurship
- Location: Detroit, Michigan, U.S.
- Members: 1000+
- Employees: 0
- Website: ventureforamerica.org

Venture for America (VFA) was an American nonprofit organization and fellowship headquartered in Detroit. Founded by Andrew Yang in 2011, its mission was "to create economic opportunity in American cities" by training recent graduates and young professionals to work for startups in emerging cities throughout the United States. Venture For America ceased operations in August 2024 after financial struggles that led to three rounds of layoffs.

== History ==
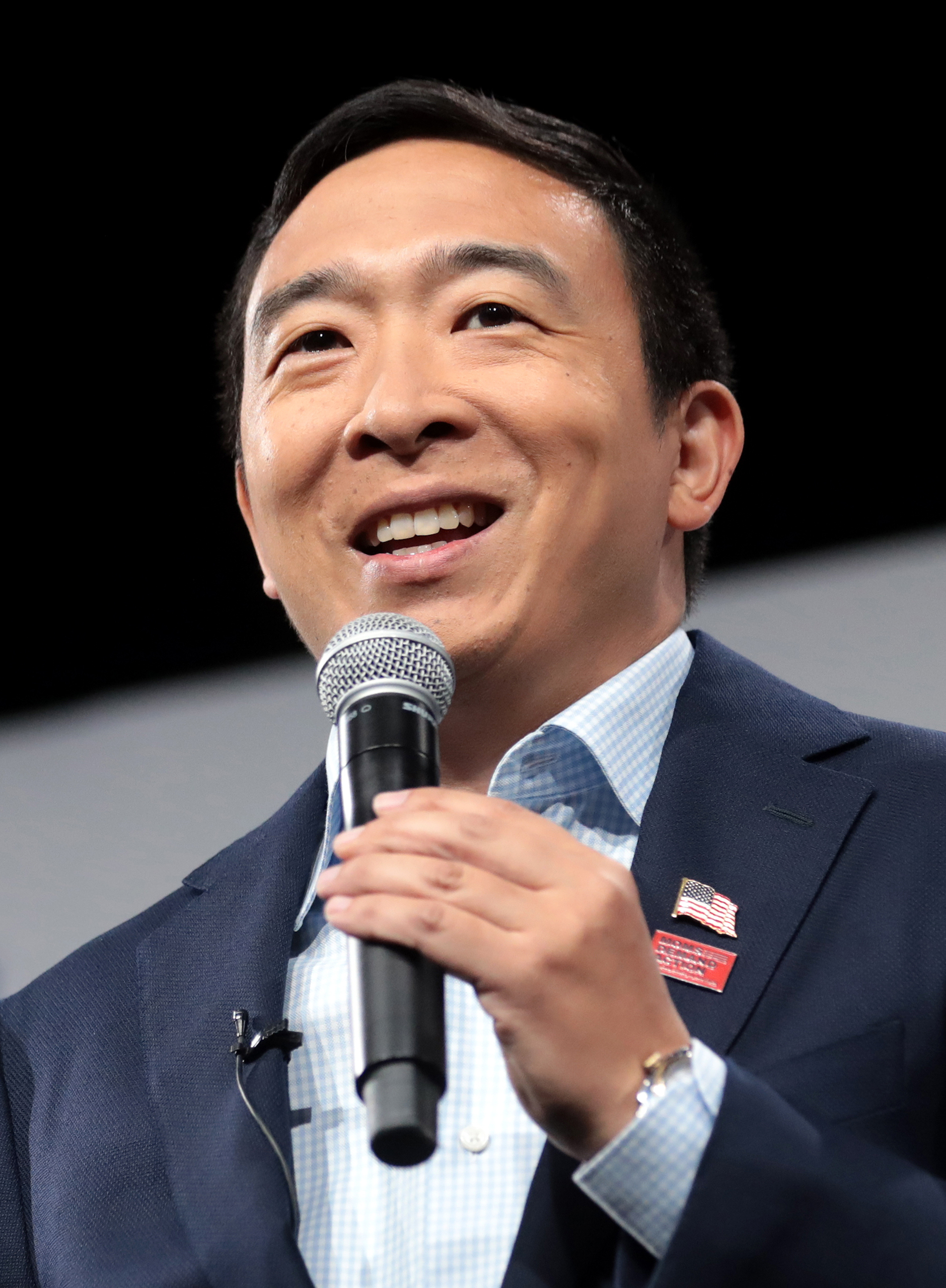
Venture for America founder Andrew Yang

In its first year, 2012, Venture for America placed 40 fellows in five cities: Cincinnati, Detroit, Las Vegas, New Orleans, and Providence.

In 2013, Baltimore, Cleveland, and Philadelphia were added, and nearly 70 fellows were placed. In 2014, more than 100 fellows were placed, and an additional four cities—Columbus, Miami, San Antonio, and St. Louis—were added. In 2015, the organization added Birmingham, Charlotte, Denver, and Pittsburgh and placed more than 120 fellows.

In 2016, a documentary about Venture for America titled Generation Startup was released, co-directed by Cynthia Wade, an Academy Award winner, and Cheryl Miller Houser. 2016 also saw the addition of Atlanta and Nashville along with nearly 170 fellows placed.

In 2017, VFA expanded to Kansas City and placed approximately 180 fellows. In mid-2017, Andrew Yang stepped down as CEO. From September 2017 to January 2021, Amy Nelson served as CEO.

In 2021, Eric Somerville was placed as CEO. Tulsa, OK was added as a VFA city.

In 2023, VFA encountered financial strain and laid off several staff members. In early 2024, CEO Eric Somerville resigned. After two more rounds of layoffs in 2024, Venture for America announced on August 6 that it would cease operations. Among the startups that have emerged from Venture for America are Winx Health, a women's health company, and Banza, known for its chickpea-based pasta products.

In 2025, alumni and former team members of VFA and its network of founders, executives, and investors started the Ember Fellowship. They launched their first cohort of fellows in 2026 with placements in Detroit, Atlanta, Birmingham, and Baltimore.

== Approach ==
Venture for America recruited recent college graduates to work in 13 cities throughout the United States. The goal of the program was for its Fellows to become startup leaders or founders.

After acceptance into the program, Fellows attended a summer professional development program called Training Camp where they were taught and mentored by investors, venture capitalists, and innovation firms in the skills they will need at their companies. The skills they learned included topics of web design, entrepreneurship, and public speaking.

Fellows were then placed in startups in cities like Baltimore, Detroit, and San Antonio in industries such as education innovation, biotechnology, VC firms, media, and clean technology. Since 2012, Venture for America has trained more than 1500 Fellows who have worked in 18 cities.

== Criticism ==
VFA originally aimed to create 100,000 jobs by 2025. Critics of the organization have noted that VFA has not yet created 4,000 jobs, and Yang himself claimed in 2021 that "hundreds" of jobs were created. In June 2019, Theodore Schleifer of Vox wrote that VFA's positive early publicity can be attributed to marketing efforts by Andrew Yang. Yang has justified his goal of creating 100,000 jobs, saying: "In order for organizations to have a very high ceiling, you need to set the goal very, very aggressively." Schleifer also claims that VFA fails to help residents living in inner cities because "Yang thought about how to fix inner cities through the prism of [wealthy donors], rather than listening to what the community wanted."
