= Smscoin =

Mobile payment systems provider

smscoin
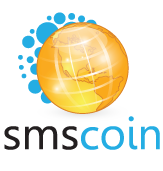

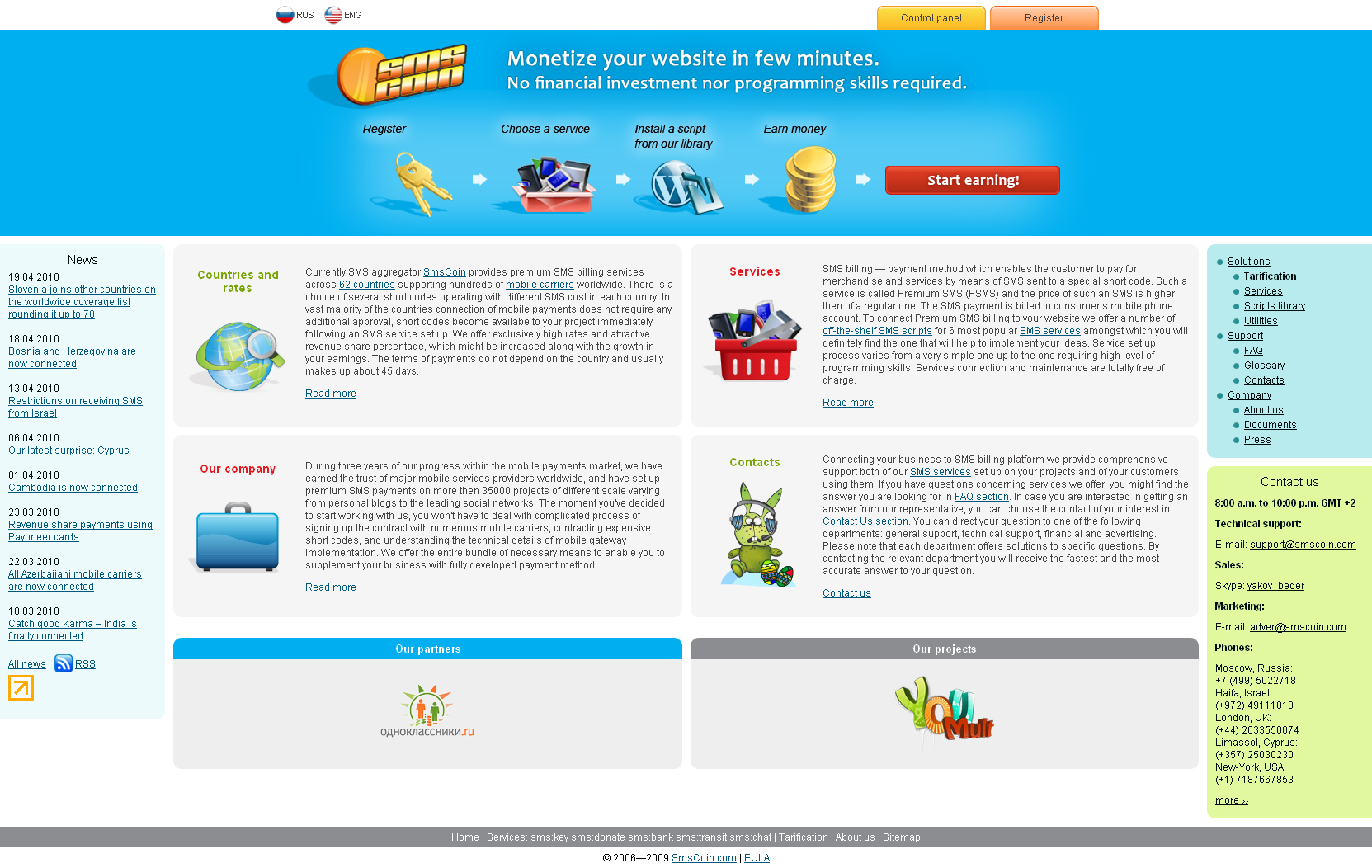
- Website type: mobile payments
- Available in: Russian, English
- No. of locations: 92 countries
- Area served: Worldwide
- Website: http://smscoin.com
- Commercial: yes
- Registration: free of charge
- Launched: July 2006

SMSCOIN is a mobile payment systems provider which specializes in SMS payments in particular, and provides premium SMS services in 92 countries supporting hundreds of mobile carrier networks worldwide. The main goal of the project was, and still is, to cover as many countries worldwide as possible.

== History ==
=== 2006 ===
SmsCoin project was launched in July 2006 with only 4 countries (Russia, Ukraine, Kazakhstan, Israel) offering 3 of the following services: sms:chat, sms:key and sms:bank. During the month of November additional service called sms:transit was developed, and closer to the end of the year 13 countries became available.

=== 2007 ===
The beginning of 2007 was marked by adding a few more countries as well as developing innovative extensions for browsers and a MIDlet that made it easier for SmsCoin' partners to access the statistics of their websites using mobile phones. English version of the website was presented in February. Its anniversary SmsCoin celebrated with 5 different sms:services across 18 countries worldwide working with over 5 thousand partners and processing more than a million SMS messages.

=== 2008 ===
Year 2008 began with presenting a new program for developing ready-to-use modules for popular CMS, 10 of which were published on the website as well as brand new service sms:content was launched. In April SmsCoin announced the connection of 30 countries worldwide. During this harsh period caused by a fierce competition on mobile payments market the project prospered due to higher payouts as well as enabling partners to choose their own short codes. Additionally, across Russia the payouts were made in rubles, and partners could request their revenue share payout once every 5 days which than was quite extraordinary. Throughout October till November additional achievements were presented - first of all a global support was launched unifying all means of contact using Instant messaging. Secondly, SmsCoin now offered its services across so much as 40 countries.

=== 2009 ===
In March 2009 SmsCoin announced a series of events starting with even greater coverage - 50 countries, connecting several Latin American countries at once, next 6 Middle Eastern countries followed in May. 3rd anniversary celebration opened with a brand new and refreshing website design and structure improvement which made it much more convenient to work with. Immediately a new service called sms:donate was launched. Towards the end of the year SmsCoin project covered as much as 65 countries including its latest "acquisitions": China, Taiwan, Hong Kong. Throughout 2009 ready-to-use scripts library was considerably expanded as part of an improvement plan that began in 2008 and continues to this day forward.

=== 2010 ===
Good karma came in the beginning of 2010 when SmsCoin project connected the following countries India and Cyprus which considered to be unique on the mobile payments market. Moreover, during the summer of 2010 SmsCoin has connected 9 additional countries: Italy, Vietnam, Guatemala, Honduras, Dominican Republic, El Salvador, Nicaragua, Panama, Paraguay, Thailand, and by achieving that finally establishing itself a unique key leader within the mobile payments market. By November 2010 SmsCoin connected 87 countries.

=== 2011 ===
Connection of new countries (Costa-Rica, Uruguay, Kenya and Ghana) was established, together with the increase of available rates range. The library of ready-made scripts for various CMS is significantly extended; in October a new product - inn-app payments library for Android OS - is presented.

=== 2019 (the end) ===
As per statement on company's website, in 2019 has been migrated to another provider and project does not work anymore.

== Unique features ==
SmsCoin is a public open-source project with free registration, and provides several features both on Russian and international markets as follows:

- coverage in more than 92 countries, some of which cannot be found on any other similar service
- library of ready-to-use modules for various CMS

== Review ==
SmsCoin service has been used repeatedly for the purposes of fraud, and despite the fact that all fraud attempts have been blocked, the service has been often criticized for its simplified registration process and services setup and maintenance.

== More ==
- Mobile payments
- Mobile commerce service provider
- Fortumo
- Zong mobile payments
- Mopay
