= C2it =

Former money transfer service

- Industry: Financial services
- Founded: 2000
- Founder: S Young Lee, Hope Chen, Will Chen, Jason May, Ian Flint, Jay Shen
- Defunct: 2003
- Fate: Defunct
- Parent: Citibank

C2it was a person-to-person money transfer service established by Citibank in 2000 as a competitor to PayPal and Billpoint. It was formed as a partnership with AOL, and later with Compuserve and Microsoft.

The service was discontinued in November 2003, due to low usage; a 2002 Gartner survey indicated that of various online money transfer methods, only 1 percent said they used C2it vs 33 percent who used PayPal.
