= Fortumo =

Company based in Estonia

- Type: Public
- Industry: Mobile payments
- Founded: 2007
- Headquarters: Tartu, Estonia
- Key people: Martin Koppel (CEO); Andrei Dementjev (COO); Raavo Leiten (CFO)
- Products: Direct carrier billing Digital wallets Mobile messaging Bundling
- Number of employees: 90
- Parent: Boku, Inc.
- Website: Fortumo.com

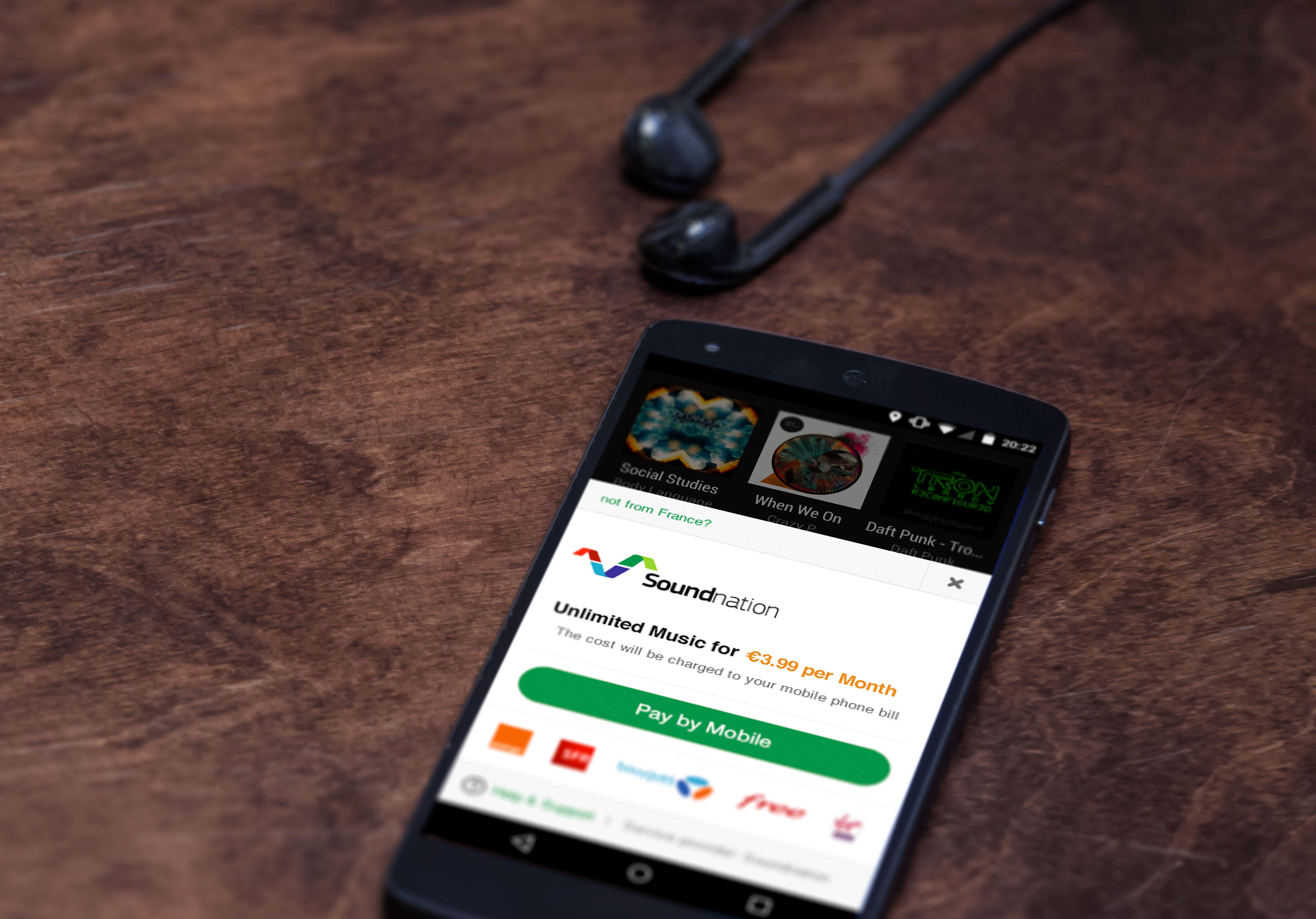
Direct carrier billing is an online payment method. It allows users to make purchases by charging payments to their mobile phone bill

Fortumo was an Estonian company which developed a platform for digital service providers for user growth and monetization.

Fortumo's products allowed digital merchants to acquire new users through telco bundle partnerships and collect payments using carrier billing and mobile wallets. The company connected merchants to a network of more than 300 telcos and digital wallets in Asia, Europe, Latin America, the Middle East and Africa.

The company started in 2007 as a spin-off of a mobile service company called Mobi Solutions. In July 2020, the company was acquired by Boku, Inc. and continued to operate under its existing brand within the group. In February 2022, the company announced consolidating its activities under the Boku, Inc. brand.

== Products ==
Fortumo provided digital content merchants with the following products for user growth and monetization:

- Payments platform: enabled digital merchants to collect payments from subscribers of over 300 mobile operators and digital wallets. Merchants could choose to either integrate one of the turn-key products provided for this purpose (Web SDK, Unified SDK) or integrate with Fortumo's API.
- Bundling platform: enabled digital merchants and mobile operators to provision discounted or free digital service access to mobile operator subscribers. Fortumo's platform provided a unified interface for user authentication, service provisioning and configuring any type of bundle offer across dozens of digital service providers and over 280 mobile operators.
- Fortumo Insight: provided mobile operators with an overview of their carrier billing performance, including data on account activations, payment behavior, top grossing content by category and payment failure rates.
- PayRead platform: enabled digital publishers to collect payments from readers through their mobile operator account and bundle their products with mobile operator plans as well as with other digital service providers.

== Customers ==
Merchants using Fortumo included app stores (Google Play), streaming services (Amazon, Spotify, iflix, Sony, Deezer, Tidal), social networks (Facebook, Badoo), publishers (Aftonbladet, Legimi), gaming companies (Epic Games, EA Mobile, Kinguin), transportation service providers (EasyPark, Mobike), classified sites (OLX).

Fortumo integrated approximately 280 mobile operators into its platform. Fortumo's mobile operator partners included mobile operator groups such as Telefónica, Telenor and Orange as well as individual mobile operators like Reliance Communications, Turkcell and Globe Telecom. Fortumo used the mobile operators' technical infrastructure to authenticate users, process payments and enable mobile messaging for its merchants while giving the mobile operators access to real-time data and payments analytics through its Fortumo Insight dashboard.

== Venture Capital Investments ==
In February 2013, Fortumo announced it had completed a growth round of financing with the first external shareholders – Intel Capital and Greycroft Partners – joining the company. Although financial details about the funding were not disclosed, TechCrunch reported approximately US$10 million as the size of the deal. Fortumo co-founder Rain Rannu explained the reasons for bringing in investors: "Working with Intel Capital and Greycroft will help us to pursue additional growth opportunities, including strategic partnerships and acquisitions".

In 2020, venture capital companies and Fortumo's former partner Mobi Solutions left the company's shareholders circle, when Boku became the new owner of the company. In February 2022, the Fortumo team joined the Boku group.

== Bundling Platform ==
In February 2017, Fortumo launched a bundling platform for digital content providers and mobile operators. Traditional bundle deals between a digital content provider (such as a VOD company) and a mobile operator require a separate integration between the parties to provision discounted or free digital service access to mobile operator subscribers. With the bundling platform, Fortumo allowed for mobile operators to connect to several digital content providers at once and vice versa, this further provided a unified interface for user authentication, service provisioning and configuring any type of bundle offer. This made the launch of bundle partnerships quicker and easier for both parties involved.

In March 2019, Fortumo deployed its Trident Bundling Platform to connect Amazon with the Indian telco BSNL. Later in the year, the company announced additional Amazon launches with Tata Sky and Orange Spain. In September 2020, the company announced the launch of Amazon for Jio.

== PayRead platform ==
In January 2019, Fortumo launched PayRead platform that enabled digital publishers (like international media group Schibsted) to identify and charge consumers through their SIM card. In March 2019, PayRead was also connected to the bundling platform. That enabled publishers to bundle their products with mobile operator plans, as well as with other digital service providers.

== Acquisition by Boku ==
In June 2020, Boku, Inc. (LSE: BOKU) announced that it intended to acquire Fortumo for $45 million. The acquisition was completed on July 1, 2020. Jon Prideaux, CEO of Boku explained the acquisition: "Boku has always grown by a mixture of organic growth and selective acquisition. This deal, which will be our sixth, cements our position as the scale player in Direct Carrier Billing. It brings together the two most profitable players in the industry, with compatible technology, complementary customers and with a great cultural fit." After the acquisition, Fortumo continued to operate under its existing brand as a separate organization within the Boku group of companies until February 2022.

== See also ==
- Direct carrier billing
- Digital wallets
- Mobile payments
- Mobile commerce service provider
- Product bundling
