= PayDirect =

Former money transfer service

- Industry: payment service provider money transfer service
- Founded: March 2000
- Defunct: November 22, 2004
- Fate: closed
- Parent: Yahoo!

Yahoo! PayDirect was the name of a person-to-person money transfer service by Yahoo! via HSBC, competing with Billpoint and PayPal.

Yahoo launched PayDirect in March 2000 after purchasing Arthas.com, a provider of electronic billing services. Arthas' dotBank.com service allowed customers to make online bill payments and to exchange money with other customers. When Yahoo took over the site, the accounts were managed by the international bank HSBC.

In 2000, Yahoo extended the Yahoo PayDirect service to mobile phones, as part of its Yahoo Everywhere initiative.

Yahoo PayDirect was initially launched with CIBC National Bank as the financial partner (based in Maitland, Florida, and a subsidiary of CIBC - one of the major Canadian banks). The service was subsequently migrated to HSBC.

The Yahoo PayDirect service was discontinued effective November 22, 2004, leaving only a web page (biz.yahoo.com/paydirect) showing "The PayDirect service and website is closed and now unavailable."

== See also ==
- Billpoint
- PayPal
