= Direct carrier billing =

Mobile payment method

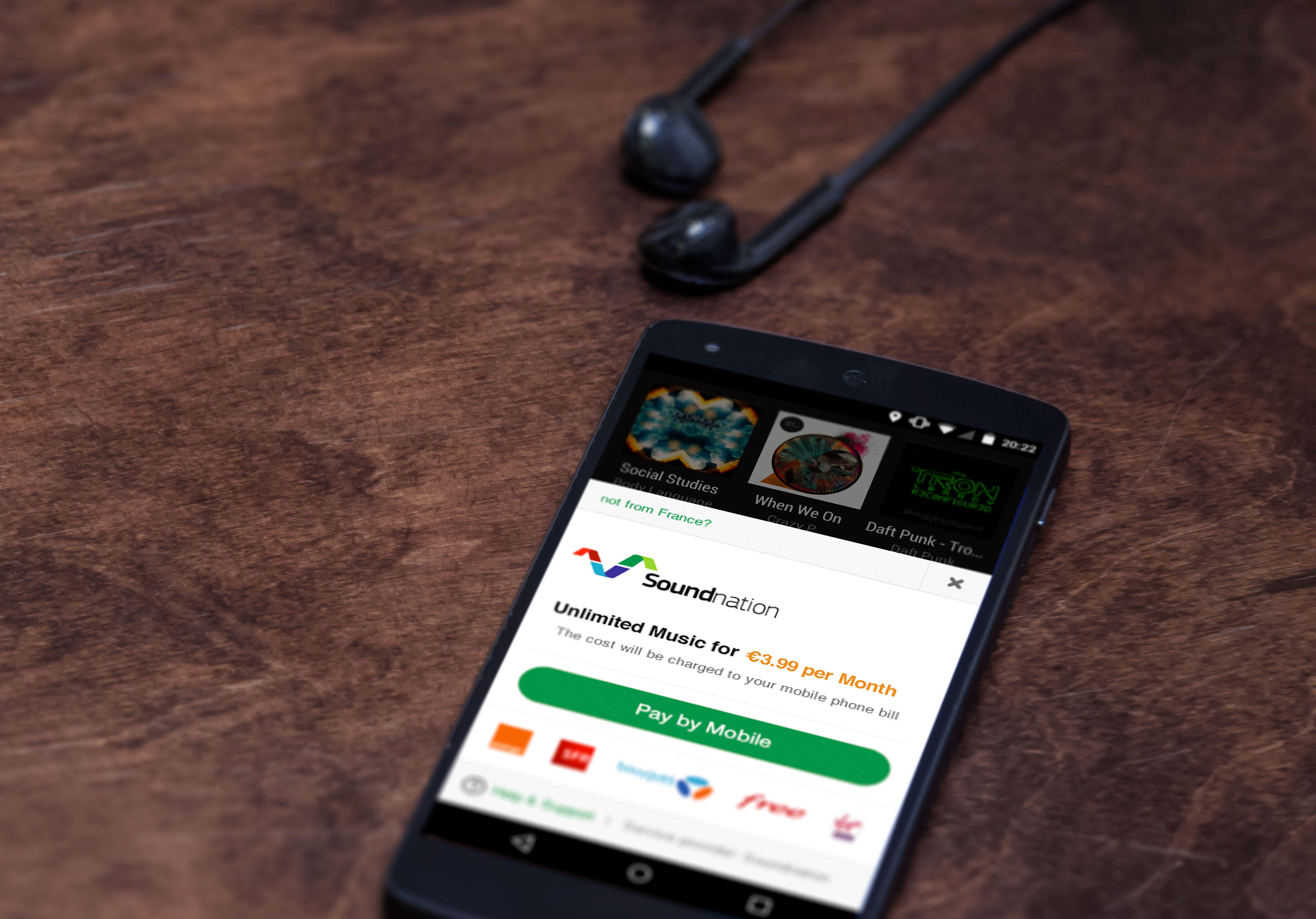
Direct carrier billing is an online payment method. It allows users to make purchases by charging payments to their mobile phone bill

Direct carrier billing (DCB) is an online mobile payment method which allows users to make purchases by charging payments to their mobile phone carrier bill.

Direct Carrier Billing is useful in mobile payments and interactive services for companies across media, charity, gaming, ticketing, mobility, and other digital services. It is especially effective in developing countries and undeveloped areas where credit card usage is not widespread. There are more than 1 billion adults that still remain unbanked or underbanked.

== Service providers ==
- Fonix
- Bango plc
- Boku, Inc.
- Fortumo
- Google Pay (mobile app)
