= Paydiant =

US financial services company, PayPal subsidiary

Paydiant, Inc.
- Company type: Subsidiary
- Founded: 2010
- Founders: Kevin Laracey; Chris Gardner; Joe Paratore
- Defunct: 2015
- Fate: Acquired
- Successor: PayPal
- Headquarters: Auburndale, Massachusetts, United States
- Parent: PayPal
- Website: www.paydiant.com

Paydiant was an American financial services company based in Auburndale, Massachusetts. It provided payment and wallet services for merchants, banks, point-of-sale, and ATM providers. The company was incorporated in 2010 and acquired by PayPal in 2015.

== History ==
In 2011, Paydiant raised $7.6 million funding from North Bridge Venture Partners and General Catalyst Partners.

Paydiant received a funding of $12 million and $15 million in 2012 and 2013 respectively.

Paydiant has provided mobile wallet platforms for MCX. In 2015, PayPal acquired Paydiant in a $280 million deal.
