= BattleHack =

- BattleHack 2014 logo
- Status: retired
- Genre: hackathon, competition
- Years active: 3
- Inaugurated: June 8, 2013
- Most recent: Nov 14-15, 2015
- Organiser: PayPal
- Website: battlehack.org

BattleHack (or Battle Hack in the 2013 series) was a series of global hackathon contests organised by PayPal. Competitors were required to solve a local problem by coding. Winners of the first prize of each contest got an axe as the trophy, and admission to the world finals where competitors competed for the $100,000 grand prize. Competitors retain the ownership of their applications made in the contests.

In 2016 PayPal/Braintree shut down the developer relations program along with all related programs such as BattleHack.

It was announced that BattleHack would be returning however as of Jan 16, 2018 the domain name lapsed and has since moved into new ownership.

== See also ==
- Hackathon

== External links gsh ==
- Official website
