= PayPal Credit =

Payment method

- Company type: Subsidiary
- Founded: 2000; 26 years ago in Timonium, Maryland, United States
- Headquarters: San Jose, California
- Area served: United States
- Owner: PayPal
- Industry: Financial services
- Parent: PayPal
- Website: www.paypal.com/credit
- Advertising: none
- Current status: active

PayPal Credit, formerly named Bill Me Later (BML), is a proprietary buy now, pay later payment method offered on merchant websites, including those of Wal-Mart, Home Depot, USPS and eBay in the United States. The site provides consumers with a line of revolving credit through Synchrony Bank.

It allows purchases to be made online without the use of a credit card by creating a line of credit. Customer, can either pay off the balance at a later date or pay it in installments. The company was one of the first recipients of the Red Herring Global 100 Award by the publication Red Herring.

On November 7, 2008, PayPal completed its acquisition of Bill Me Later. It was formerly owned by I4 Commerce and created by GoPin Inc.

== History ==
The company was established as I4 Commerce in 2000. It obtained corporate debt financing in 2006 to continue to grow the business. In 2007 the company changed its name to Bill me Later.

On November 7, 2008, PayPal completed its acquisition of Bill Me Later and rebranded it as PayPal Credit. After the PayPal acquisition, Bill Me Later was offered as a payment method through PayPal at sites that accept both PayPal and Bill Me Later.

On May 19, 2015 CFPB filed a complaint and proposed consent order in federal court against PayPal, Inc. for illegally signing up consumers for its online credit product.

Prior to 2012, besides its consumer service, Bill Me Later also offered Bill Me Later Business and Preferred Account. In Bill Me Later Business, the users were business owners who want to use the equivalent of a corporate card for buying products and services over the web. The business owner would apply for Bill Me Later Business account. The Preferred Account was similar to the concept of a charge card that could be used at a particular merchant only. This service was discontinued as of May 13, 2012.

In 2021, PayPal credit card also admitted to converting gift cards to cash with few conditions.

== Process ==
After a customer opens an accounts (including credit checks), PayPal Credit asks customers at every purchase to log into their PayPal account to complete the transaction. Once the PayPal Credit account is linked to PayPal, PayPal credit becomes a funding option within the PayPal account. PayPal credit will email the customer whenever they are declined. PayPal Credit is not a credit card but a revolving line of credit offered by Synchrony Bank. Much like a traditional credit card, the company will charge late payments if necessary.

== Terms ==
As of 2019, for purchases of $99 and over that are made through PayPal wallet, customers have 6 months to pay their bill in full. If they don't, then they are charged interest at a 19.99% APR starting from the original purchase date. Purchases not made through the PayPal wallet will only receive promotional financing if the merchant is offering it. Customers using this service should be aware that using PayPal credit for conveniences such as snacks or food orders which contain alcohol are not allowed to be paid with PayPal Credit and must use a different payment method to complete their transaction.
