= Zong (payments provider) =

American micropayments provider

ZONG
- Industry: Telecommunications; Mobile communications Payments
- Founded: 2008; 18 years ago
- Headquarters: Menlo Park, California, United States
- Products: Electronic payments Mobile Payments
- Owner: eBay
- Number of employees: 80
- Website: zong.com

Zong was a mobile payment company that allowed users to make micropayments on the Internet if they have a postpaid mobile phone. The payments were charged to their mobile phone bills by the mobile operator. The company was acquired by eBay in 2011 and disappeared in 2015.

Zong payments were only accepted by online games and social networks, and the service can be used to purchase virtual goods[]. Zong was awarded the 2009 Frost & Sullivan Best Practices Award for New Product Innovation in the Mobile Payments category. In May 2015, Zong disappeared from the web without any public declaration. The website now simply redirects to PayPal.

== History ==
Zong appeared in 2008, as a new mobile payment solution in the USA, an offshoot of Echovox that allowed users to pay for items online directly through their mobile phone bills. This was made to boost the business development of this disruptive application.

In 2011 the former CEO of mobile payments technology developer Zong, David Marcus sold Zong to PayPal as he become the new president there.

In May 2015, Zong disappeared from the web without any public declaration.

== Services and Partnerships ==
Zong focused on social networks and online games. They were useful to people who did not have a credit card and those who wanted to make small purchases online. Zong allowed them to pay with their mobile terminal and the amount was then debited by the mobile operator.

The partnership of Zong with mobile operators allowed them to charge customers using short numbers. On March 12, 2009, Zong announced to stop short messaging services and target its mobile payment system. Zong published an application programming interface to allow developers to sell and publish content to mobile customers worldwide.

== See also ==
- Mobile commerce service provider
