= David A. Marcus =

American entrepreneur (born 1973)

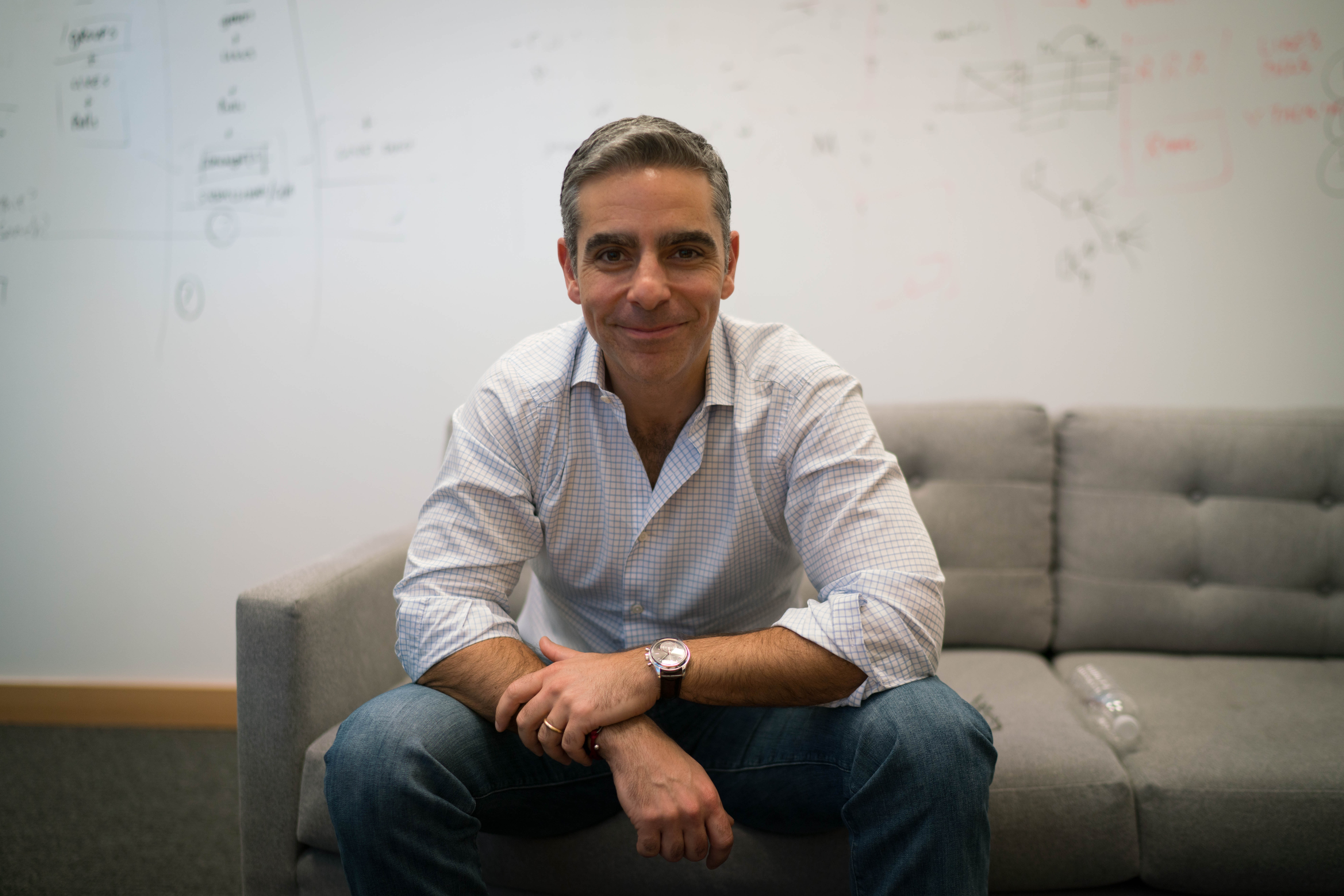
- Marcus in 2016
- Born: April 12, 1973 (age 53); Paris, France
- Occupations: Co-founder and CEO of Lightspark
- Years active: 1996–present

David A. Marcus (Romanian: Mărcuș; born April 12, 1973) is a French-born American entrepreneur. He was the co-creator of Diem, a cryptocurrency project initiated by Facebook. He is the former president of PayPal and Vice President of Messaging Products at Facebook where he ran the Facebook Messenger unit from 2014 until 2018. In December 2017, Marcus was appointed to the Coinbase Board of Directors, from which he stepped down in 2018. In 2021, he stepped down from Facebook. As of May 2022 he is the co-founder and CEO of Lightspark, a cryptocurrency startup which works on bitcoin and the Lightning Network.

== Early life and education ==
Marcus was born on April 12, 1973 in Paris, France to a Romanian father and Iranian mother. He grew up in Geneva, Switzerland. At the age of 8, he learned BASIC computer coding. Marcus attended the University of Geneva for one year before dropping out initially to support his family by working at a bank and later to pursue an entrepreneurial career.

== Career ==
In 1996 at age 23 Marcus founded GTN Telecom, a Geneva-based provider of internet access and telephone service. He was the chairman and CEO of that company until it was acquired by World Access in 2000. After that, Marcus founded Echovox, a mobile media monetization company. In 2008, he founded Zong, an offshoot of Echovox that allowed users to pay for items online directly through their mobile phone bills.

Zong was acquired by eBay's PayPal in August 2011 for $240 million, and Marcus joined PayPal as vice president and general manager of the company's Mobile Division. PayPal's mobile division launched PayPal Here, an offline mobile card reader service. In April 2012 Marcus replaced Scott Thompson as President of PayPal after Thompson went to Yahoo. In September 2013, Marcus oversaw PayPal's $800-million acquisition of Braintree (the parent company of Venmo).

In June 2014, Marcus left PayPal to join Facebook as its Vice President of Messaging Products. There he oversaw the development of the Facebook Messenger mobile app. The app reached 1 billion active users in July 2016. Marcus is credited with the introduction of Messenger's P2P payment platform which was released in the United States in June 2015. Marcus would later help implement business payments on the platform.

In December 2017, Marcus was appointed to the board of directors of the cryptocurrency exchange, Coinbase. According to the announcement, he was chosen based on his experience with digital payments at both PayPal and Facebook and his knowledge of cryptocurrency. He is also considered an early promoter of cryptocurrency.

In May 2018, Marcus moved from Vice President of Messaging Products to lead the experimental blockchain group at Facebook. In August 2018, Marcus left the board at Coinbase, at least in part to avoid the appearance of a conflict of interest with his work on Facebook.

By February 2019, The New York Times reported that Marcus was head of a program to develop a cryptocurrency that users of WhatsApp (which is owned by Facebook) could transfer to facilitate cross-border payments. In June 2019, Marcus and Facebook announced Libra, a cryptocurrency managed by Facebook and other companies as the Libra Association. Marcus was placed in charge of Calibra, a subsidiary of Facebook created for the project. According to Clare Duffy, writing for CNN Business, "criticism from politicians, regulators and finance experts came swiftly". Concern was raised that Libra would be destabilizing to global currencies and central banking and that Libra would give Facebook even more control and personal information than it already has. Libra's announcement also coincided with a multi-state antitrust probe of Facebook (see Federal Trade Commission v. Facebook). In July 2019, Marcus was called to testify before the US Senate Banking Committee regarding Libra. He stated that Libra would not be launched without approval from regulators.

In May 2020, Calibra was renamed Novi, which would also be the name of a proposed cryptocurrency wallet offered by Facebook. In August 2020, Marcus was placed in charge of the Facebook Financial (F2) division, which would handle Facebook's payment service and WhatsApp Pay in some countries. Marcus continued to work to gain regulatory approval for Facebook to use Libra for international payments. In December 2020, Libra was renamed Diem, and the Libra Association was renamed the Diem Association. This change was to emphasize changes made to the plan following its harsh reception from regulators. Marcus is one of five board members of the Diem Association.

In November 2021, Marcus announced that he would be leaving Facebook (recently renamed Meta) at the end of the year. Stephane Kasriel is scheduled to take over as head of Meta's financial services division.

In May 2022, Marcus co-founded a company called Lightspark that describes itself as using the Lightning Network to "extend the capabilities of bitcoin". The company received financing led by venture capital firms a16z and Paradigm Operations.

In October 2023, Marcus announced that Lightspark open sourced the Money Address (UMA) standard.
