= Key reseller =

Type of business selling video game product keys

A key reseller is a type of business involved in the digital distribution of video games. Video games can be sold digitally with product keys that are used to obtain copies of the games. Key resellers act as a secondary market or grey market, selling keys for services such as Steam, Origin, PlayStation Network, or Xbox Live, often at large discounts from the retail price. The most popular key resellers operate as marketplaces where users in possession of keys can sell them to other users. Other resellers act only as storefronts, obtaining and selling keys themselves rather than acting as a marketplace for users. Key resellers are distinct from third-party key retailers, which typically obtain keys from developers, publishers, or middleman companies.

Key resellers have drawn controversy for the provenance of the keys, and have been accused of selling fraudulently obtained keys, such as by users obtaining free keys by pretending to be influencers or by abusing differences in region locked pricing. The scale of the problem is disputed: legitimately obtained keys on the marketplaces include those sold by users who obtained extra keys via buying game bundles, or from speculative purchases during time-limited sales. Key resellers are also opposed by game publishers, due to the latter's interest in controlling the prices at which their games are sold. Game development studios have also criticized the practice of key reselling, with some commenting that they would rather users pirate their games than obtain a copy via a reseller.

Major key resellers that operate as marketplaces include G2A and Kinguin, and those that operate as storefronts include Loaded (formerly CDKeys), MMOGA, and SCDKey.
