= Billpoint =

Former money transfer service

- Industry: Financial services
- Founded: October 1998; 27 years ago
- Founders: Sang Young Lee; Hope Chen; Will Chen; Jason May; Ian Flint; Jay Shen
- Defunct: 2003
- Successor: eBay
- Headquarters: Redwood City, California, United States
- Website: www.billpoint.com

Billpoint was the name of a person-to-person money transfer service founded in 1998, and purchased in 1999 by online auctioneer eBay.

== History ==
Billpoint was founded in 1998 by Sang Young Lee, Hope Chen, Will Chen, Jason May, Ian Flint and Jay Shen, with headquarter in Redwood City, California. The company obtained venture funding from Sequoia Capital in February 1999, and later that year was purchased by eBay; its website was taken offline while integration into eBay's auction service took place. It reappeared in 2000 when it was relaunched as a joint venture with Wells Fargo bank.

During this interval, online payment service PayPal was launched, rapidly becoming popular with eBay's customers. Billpoint and eBay spent much of the next two years trying to overtake PayPal, but with mixed results.

In July 2002, eBay CEO Meg Whitman agreed to the acquisition of PayPal with its CEO Peter Thiel. When the deal was closed in October 2002, eBay began the process of phasing out Billpoint. The shutdown was completed in early 2003.
