= Tenthwave Digital =

American digital marketing company

Tenthwave Digital (digital agency)
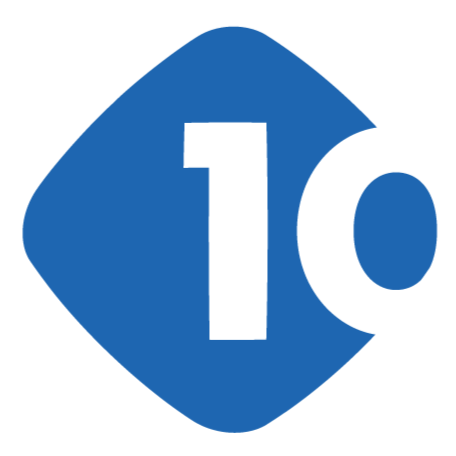
- Founded: 2011
- Headquarters: New York City, U.S.
- No. of locations: Melville, NY, Washington, DC
- Area served: Worldwide
- Key people: Drew Rayman (Managing Partner), Steve Caputo (Managing Partner), Brian Hack (Partner), Eric Schwamberger (Partner), Rob Kaplan (Partner), Mike Mazar (Partner)
- Industry: Marketing & Advertising
- Services: Customer intelligence, Strategy, Social marketing, Design & Development, Digital advertising, Promotions & Campaigns, SEO & Paid Search
- Employees: 50+
- Website: www.tenthwave.com
- Current status: Active

Tenthwave Digital is a digital agency founded in 2011 as a merger of three other digital agencies. It specializes in social marketing, digital strategy, website design and development, SEO and SEM, digital advertising, promotions, sweepstakes and technology.

Its works include an "I'm Voting" app for Facebook and CNN to encourage users to commit to voting in the 2012 United States Presidential election, Canadian Club's "Hide A Case Campaign," as well as campaigns for Birds Eye Vegetables and Voss Water. It has been a Facebook Preferred Marketing Developer in Applications since 2011.
