= Fonix =

London-based mobile payments and messaging provider

Fonix Mobile Plc
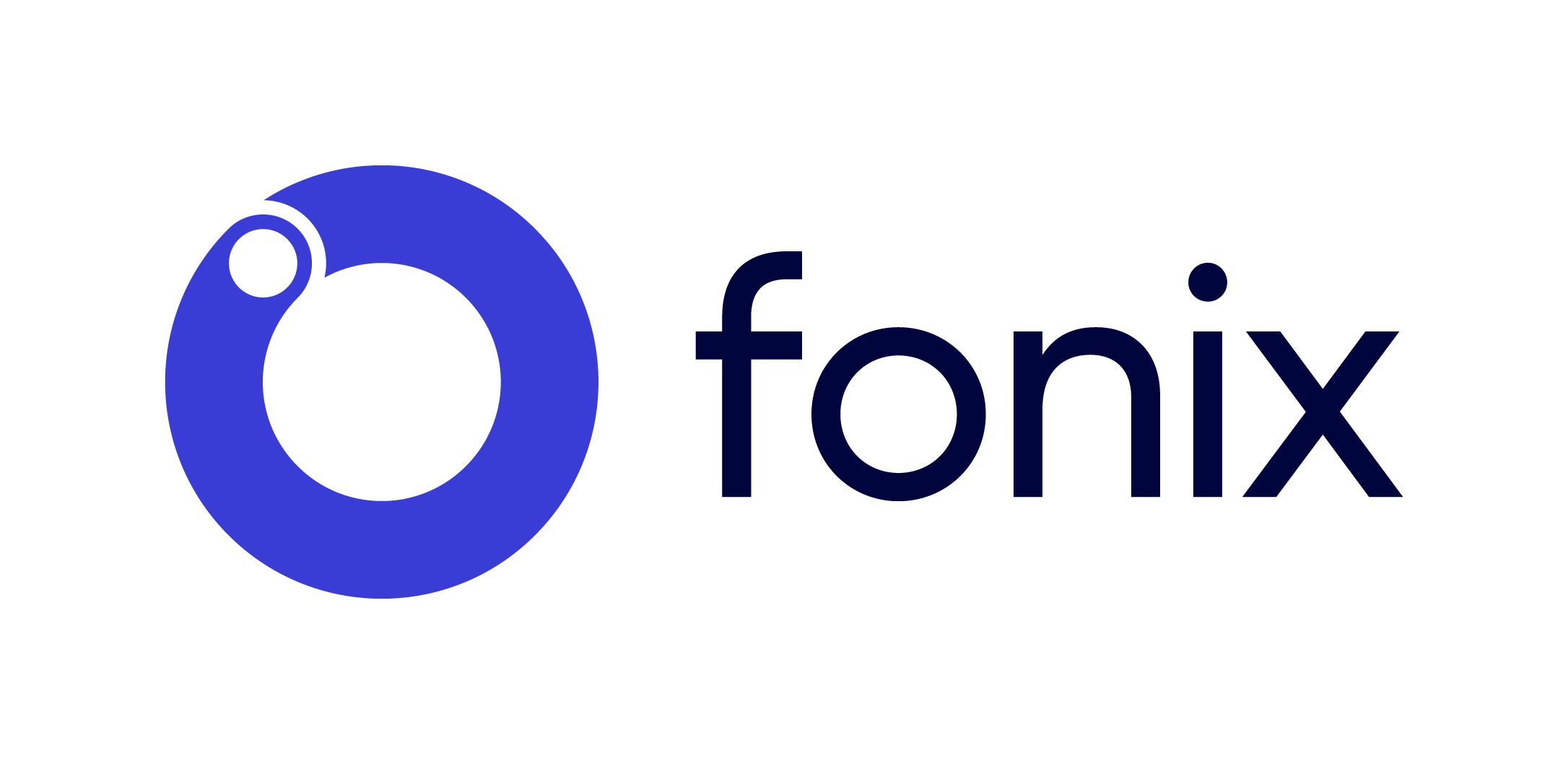
- Former name: Orca Digital
- Company type: Public company
- Traded as: LSE: FNX
- Founded: 2006; 20 years ago
- Headquarters: London, {{{location_country}}}
- Area served: Worldwide
- Founders: Will Neale, Rob Weisz
- Key people: Rob Weisz (CEO), Michael Foulkes (CFO), Edward Spurrier (Chairman), Will Neale (Non-Executive Director), Carmel Warren (Non-Executive Director)
- Industry: Payment service
- Website: fonix.com
- Current status: Active

Fonix is a British payment company that provides a mobile payments and a mobile messaging platform. The company is headquartered in London.

Its services are used by the media, entertainment, telecoms, enterprise and commerce sectors and Fonix has connections to all of the UK mobile networks. When consumers make payments, they are charged to their mobile phone bill. This service can be used for ticketing, content, cash deposits and donations.

The company was founded in 2006 and it has partnerships with Vodafone (of which it is a platinum partner), EE Limited, Telefónica UK Limited and Hutchison 3G. Fonix's clients include ITV (TV network), Global, TNT Sports, Bauer and BBC Children in Need, Comic Relief and more.

== History ==
Fonix was originally named Orca Digital and was founded in 2006 in Chiswick, London. Orca Digital focused upon mobile telephony and providing interactive services to the media and entertainment sectors.

In 2014, Orca Digital relaunched as Fonix Mobile under CEO Rob Weisz. At this point, the business became focused upon mobile operator payments and mobile messaging services to a range of sectors including media, charity, telecoms, enterprise, gaming and entertainment.

Since 2014, Fonix has secured contracts with Channel 5, Sport Relief, Children in Need, Unicef (Soccer Aid), TNT Sport, ITV, Stand Up To Cancer, Ruth Strauss and many more.

In 2015 and 2016, Fonix was listed in the Sunday Times Hiscox Tech Track, ranking 34th and 28th respectively. In 2015 and 2016, Fonix ranked 50th and 37th in the Deloitte Fast 50 respectively. In 2015 and 2016, Fonix ranked 363rd and 238th respectively in the Deloitte Technology Fast 500. In 2016 and 2017, Fonix won the Moma Award for the Not for Profit/Charity Mobile Strategy/Campaign of the year. This was to recognise their use of SMS for collecting gift aid for the 2015 Children in Need Campaign.

Fonix went public at the London Stock exchange (AIM) in October 2020. The company successfully raised £45m with a market capitalisation on admission of £90m, growing to £240m by August 2024.

== Process ==
Fonix's service works by charging digital payments to the mobile phone bill, either via Carrier Billing or SMS Billing. Fonix also offers messaging solutions.

=== Carrier billing ===
APIs are used to charge users to their phone bills through desktop, mobile or apps. Fonix's Carrier Billing services can be used for ticketing (e.g. parking tickets and cinema tickets), content (e.g. paying for film or magazines) and cash deposits.

=== SMS billing ===
Fonix's API charges customers to their phone bills via SMS. This means that customers can purchase services or make charitable donations and are charged by sending the text message. The service is most commonly used for digital purchases, such as content, donations, voting, competitions and polls.

=== Messaging ===
Fonix's messaging services have the capability to send and receive SMS online, via an API or via SMPP. RCS messaging can be used to send richer message content.
