= Boku, Inc. =

American mobile payments company

Boku
- Type: Public
- Traded as: AIM: BOKU
- Industry: Payment service provider
- Founded: 2009; 17 years ago
- Founder: Mark Britto; Ron Hirson; Erich Ringewald; Javier Martell
- Headquarters: London, U.K.
- Areas served: Worldwide
- Key people: Stuart Neal (CEO); Robert Whittick (CFO)
- Website: www.boku.com

Boku, Inc. is a mobile payments company that allows businesses to collect online payments through both carrier billing and mobile wallets, and is headquartered in London, U.K. Boku utilizes mobile network operator (carrier) data for consumers online. Boku operates in over 90 countries globally, offering a bank-grade payment system.

In 2020, Boku processed over one billion billable transactions and processed over $7 billion in payments volume.

== History ==
Boku was founded in 2009 by Mark Britto, Erich Ringewald and Ron Hirson using the combined assets of Mobillcash Ltd. and Paymo, Inc. Boku raised a $13 million Series A investment from Khosla Ventures, Index Ventures and Benchmark.

A year later, in 2010 Boku raised an additional US$25 million Series C investment, led by DAG Ventures. In 2012, Boku raised another US$35 million, Series C investment led by NEA and existing venture capital investors. In 2016, Boku again raised an additional US$13.75 million led by a consortium of UK investors along with GMO Payment Gateway. In total, Boku has raised more than $91M in venture capital funding from Benchmark Capital, Index Ventures, Khosla Ventures, DAG Ventures, Andreessen Horowitz, New Enterprise Associates, Telefónica, and GMO Payment Gateway.

On November 20, 2017, Boku listed its shares on the London Stock Exchange (AIM) through an £125 million initial public offering.

== Expansion ==
In 2012, Boku launched mobile wallet payments with GCash in the Philippines.

In 2013, Boku announced the acquisition of Indian-based Qubecell.

In 2014, Boku launched mobile payments for the Sony PlayStation Store. The same year, they acquired German-based carrier billing provider Mopay.

Boku acquired Mobileview, giving the company access to all four major mobile operators in Italy. In 2017, Boku exceeded $1B in annual payment volume for the first time.

In 2018, Boku acquired Danal to add mobile authentication services that secure consumer accounts and transactions.

In 2020, Boku acquired Fortumo, a carrier billing company, and recorded revenues of $54.6 million.

Through its subsidiary, Boku Network Services IN Pvt. Ltd., Boku Inc. has obtained complete clearance from the Reserve Bank of India (RBI) to operate as a Payment Aggregator in India. This progress comes after the first in-principle permission that was given on 31 January 2023.

== Partnerships ==
Boku's payments customers include Google, Sony, Microsoft, Facebook, Tencent, Spotify, Electronic Arts, DAZN and Riot Games amongst others. Payments partners include mobile operators Vodafone, Verizon, Jio, Deutsche Telekom, Telefónica, Saudi Telecom (STC), SK Telecom, Zong and mobile wallet providers LINE Pay, KakaoPay, RabbitLinePay, GCash, GoPay, OVO, Dana, GrabPay.

== Products and services ==
Boku provides businesses with the ability to accept mobile payments (direct carrier billing and mobile wallets) online from consumers. Boku also offers a subscription bundling product, named Trident, that enables subscription services to be offered to consumers through a mobile network operator. Additionally, Boku offers mobile identity products that utilize mobile network operator data in order for consumers to verify their identity in order to complete transactions online.

== Recognition and awards ==
In 2011, Mobile Trax awarded Boku their Mobility Award. In 2011 and 2013, Forbes selected Boku for their 25 most promising companies in America list.

In 2014, Boku won the "Best Alternative Payments" award at 2014 Payment Awards.

In 2020, Boku won the "Future Digital Awards" for Best Mobile Money Offering and Fraud Detection and Prevention Innovation.

== See also ==
- Mobile commerce service provider
- E-commerce payment system
- List of online payment service providers
- Micropayment
- Payment service provider
