= Money transmitter =

Business that provides money transfer services or payment instruments

In the legal code of the United States, a money transmitter or money transfer service is a business entity that provides money transfer services or payment instruments. Money transmitters in the US are part of a larger group of entities called money service businesses, or MSBs. Under federal law, 18 USC § 1960, businesses are required to register for a money transmitter license where their activity falls within the state definition of a money transmitter.

== Regulation ==
Forty-nine US states (sans Montana) regulate (i.e., require licensure for) money transmitters, although the laws vary from one state to the other. Most of the states require a money transmitter surety bond with widely ranging amounts from as little as $25,000 to over $1 million and maintain a minimum capital requirement. There is an association of state regulators, the Money Transfer Regulators Association (MTRA) that seeks to create uniformity, common practices, and efficient and effective regulation of the money transmission industry in the United States of America. The MTRA membership consists of state regulatory authorities in charge of regulating money transmitters and sellers of traveler’s checks, money orders, drafts, and other money instruments. In the Spring of 2019, the MTRA created the Industry Advisory Council (“IAC”) in order to consult, advise, and assist the MTRA Board of Directors on issues relating to money services business regulation.

Through their Vision 2020 program, US state regulators, as the primary regulators of non-bank and fintech firms committed to fostering innovation, are transforming the licensing process, harmonizing supervision, engaging fintech companies, assisting state banking departments, making it easier for banks to provide services to non-banks, and making supervision more efficient for third parties.

The Financial Crimes Enforcement Network (FinCEN) of the U.S. Treasury Department requires MSBs to register. It is also a felony to engage in money transmission without a license in any state that requires a license to operate. Internet and mobile-based payment services are also required to seek a state money transmitter license to offer services to individuals residing in the state.

FINCEN has also ruled that Informal Value Transfer Systems (IVTS) are considered money transmitters for the purposes of registration and licensing. FINCEN defines an IVTS as "any system, mechanism, or network of people that receives money for the purpose of making the funds or an equivalent value payable to a third party in another geographic location, whether or not in the same form". These are known as Hawala in the Middle East, Afghanistan, and Pakistan; "hundi" in India; and '"fei ch’ien" in China.

In regulations enacted in 2012 under the Dodd-Frank Act, the Consumer Financial Protection Bureau (CFPB) extended its regulation under a "Remittance Rule" that added some additional protection for US consumers who send money electronically to foreign countries. The rule targets any remittance institution defined as consumer-to-consumer transfers of low monetary value, made via money transmitters, banks, or credit unions, through wire transfers or Automated Clearing House (ACH) transactions, to businesses as well as to individuals in foreign countries.

== See also ==
- Money laundering
- Remittance
