= Mobile commerce service provider =

A mobile commerce service provider or mobile content and service provider (MCSP) (Note: Sources using the first definition: Sources using the second definition:) is an organization (or company) that provides any combination of consulting, software and computer systems for mobile e-commerce platforms, mobile devices (cellular phones, smartphones), mobile commerce, mobile content or mobile web sites.

MCSPs supply businesses with the tools and services they need to distribute and sell products and services over both the Internet and Mobile Internet and manage their online enterprises. Specifically, these firms specialize in all aspects of mobile commerce, including for all digital goods (games, video, ringtones, wallpapers and applications) that are downloaded to mobile devices.

== MCSPs provide service in areas such as ==
- mobile device databases
- billing systems
- text messaging services
- hardware/software design
- mobile payments
- brand recognition
- distribution control
- Web site development and hosting
- Web site performance monitoring
- fulfillment management
- online marketing
- order processing and delivery
- Mobile app development
