= John Earle Sullivan =

American political activist and photojournalist

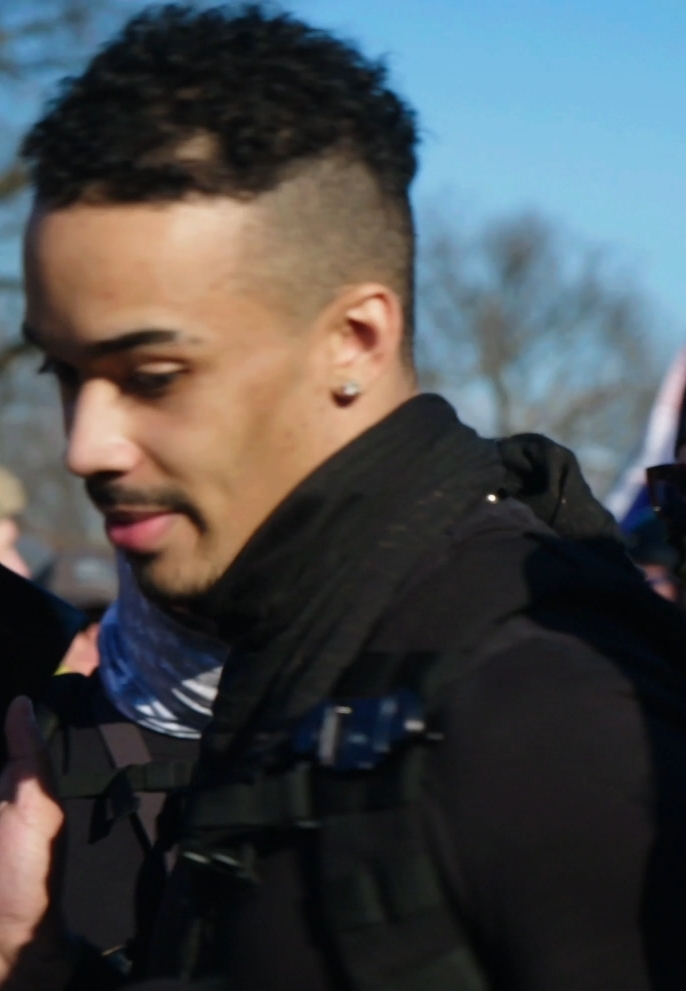
- Sullivan at the Washington Monument, 2021
- Born: July 18, 1994 (age 32)
- Other names: Jayden X; Activist John

John Earle Sullivan (born July 18, 1994), also known as Activist John, is an American political activist, convicted felon, and self-identified photojournalist who participated in the January 6, 2021 United States Capitol attack. In November 2023, he was convicted by a jury of felony obstruction of an official proceeding, civil disorder, and five misdemeanors.

Before the January 6 attack, Sullivan organized and participated in protests relating to the Black Lives Matter (BLM) movement, though a few other BLM organizers explicitly disavowed him, even expelling Sullivan from rallies and warning fellow activists to avoid associating with Sullivan.

On January 6, Sullivan entered the Capitol wearing Trump/MAGA hat and attire and broke a window. Using a bullhorn, he repeatedly shouted encouragement to fellow rioters. Sullivan captured footage of the attack, his own interactions with law enforcement, and the killing of Ashli Babbitt.

Following Sullivan's participation in the Capitol attack, Rudy Giuliani accused Sullivan of being affiliated with Antifa. By May 2021, Sullivan was facing eight federal charges for his involvement in the January 6 events.

On November 16, 2023, Sullivan was convicted of five felonies and two misdemeanor charges. On April 23, 2024, he was sentenced to six years in prison.

On January 20, 2025, the first day of the second presidency of Donald Trump, Sullivan was pardoned along with nearly every other participant in the Capitol attack.

== Early life and family ==
Sullivan was adopted into a conservative Latter-Day Saint family. His father, John Sullivan Sr., was a lieutenant colonel in the US Army. Sullivan has three younger brothers. Sullivan grew up in Stafford, Virginia. Around 2013, the family moved to Utah.

After graduating from high school, Sullivan applied to be a police officer. Sullivan got involved in speed skating and in 2016, Sullivan was featured in a commercial blog post on Uber's site, describing him as "searching for a way to earn money that fit with his busy training schedule". Sullivan participated in the 2018 Olympic trials but failed to qualify; Despite this, he has claimed to have "competed in the 2018 Olympic Games".

== Activism prior to the 2021 Capitol attack ==
In June 2020, Sullivan began to attend Black Lives Matter (BLM) protests. According to Lex Scott, the founder of Black Lives Matter-Utah, none of the activists knew him before this time.

=== Civilized Awakening and Insurgence USA ===
Conservative activist James Sullivan, John's brother, reports that John was conservative "until recently". James Sullivan founded "Civilized Awakening", part of the greater far-right Patriot movement.

In June 2020, John Sullivan founded "Insurgence USA", a group participating in protests against police violence. Sullivan was accused of exploiting the racial justice movement for self-gain. The Salt Lake Tribune observed that Sullivan had been selling merchandise and indulging in self-promotion on many websites; his Insurgence USA website sells protest-related gear, such as black clothing, gloves, and gas masks, branded "bloc gear collective".

=== Car protest, shooting and arrest ===
External videos
- Footage of shots fired at June 29, 2020 protest in Provo.

On June 29, 2020, Sullivan led his first protest event, in Provo, Utah. BLM leader Lex Scott recalled: "His very first protest he held was the one someone got shot". The event was a counter-protest against a pro-police event where a Back the Blue group drove vehicles driving around the Provo police station. Meanwhile, Sullivan and others organized a counter-protest blocking vehicles and interfering with traffic on a busy street. One man affiliated with Sullivan, Jesse Taggart, was charged with attempted murder for shooting and injuring a driver who had slowly moved through the crowd of protestors. The shooting victim was not affiliated with either protest group.

Sullivan was arrested and charged with rioting, making a threat of violence and criminal mischief. According to a police affidavit, Sullivan damaged vehicles and cooperated with Insurgence USA to recruit protesters for a protest. Sullivan indicated that he thought the driver Taggart shot was trying to run over protesters, a claim police disputed based on video evidence of the event.

=== Ties to Proud Boys ===
External videos
- Speech by James Sullivan to a Proud Boys rally in Portland on Sept 26, 2020, mentioning his brother John.

Sullivan organized events in Provo, Utah, that were controversial with BLM. Sullivan experienced greater skepticism after a July 1, 2020, event where he invited speeches from the Proud Boys, an American far-right, neo-fascist organization that promotes and engages in political violence. Sullivan's close relationship with the Proud Boys led to BLM activists refusing to work with him. Sullivan later got his group firearms training. On September 26, Sullivan's brother James had addressed a Proud Boys rally in Portland on behalf of James's far-right group Civilized Awakening.

=== Criticism for armed protest ===
On July 22, 2020, Sullivan held a solo, armed protest at the Utah State Capitol, carrying an AR-15. The protest lasted a few hours, during which he was confronted by twenty armed men from Utah Citizens' Alarm. As he began carrying assault rifles to protest, this invited hostility from both the right and the left.

In August 2020, Sullivan was filmed giving a speech outside the US Capitol. Sullivan spoke of "burning this shit down" and told the crowd "we gotta rip Trump out of that office right over there" while pointing to the White House; he added "we ain't fucking waiting til the next election". Lex Scott said that Sullivan seemed to have "a death wish" as he thought it would be "cool, or amazing, if he was killed at a protest and it started a revolution". She has also denied Sullivan is a member of BLM-Utah and expressed suspicions of his seeking fame, adding he never attended any BLM meetings nor worked alongside them to advance their agenda.

=== Work with Jade Sacker ===
According to James Sullivan, by October 2020, he and his brother John were subjects of a documentary being filmed by Jade Sacker. Sacker reportedly used two teams to document the brothers' efforts. Sacker would later accompany John Sullivan into the Capitol on January 6.

=== Denounced and expelled ===
An activist from Portland warned people not to trust him, after he managed to get local activists arrested in September 2020 by leading them down a wrong route and into a police kettle; Sullivan was widely-suspected of being a double agent working for law enforcement. In Signal chat groups, Sullivan would use various sock puppet accounts to create the illusion that others were defending the reputation of John Sullivan. Labor activist Talia Jane said Sullivan is "reviled throughout the activist space".

On September 16, James Sullivan and Civilized Awakening held a counterprotest against BLM. James brought a bodyguard to a BLM protest; that individual was arrested on charges of brandishing a firearm.

On November 26, 2020, Seattle activists published a memo accusing John Sullivan of being an agent provocateur seeking to undermine the Black Lives Matter movement:

"John has been kicked from the #SaltLakeCity and #Portland protest scenes due to alarming behaviors including grifting/profiteering, self-promotion/clout chasing, sabotage of community actions, threats of violence, and — maybe most disturbingly — ties to the far-right ... John's brother, James, is the co-founder of a pro-Trump org called 'Civilized Awakening,' and has strong ties to Proud Boys — even having spoken at a Proud Boy rally. The brothers' polarized political stances conveniently bolster the other's public personas. Activists in these cities recommend that he be barred from community actions and totally avoided."

On December 12, Pro- and Anti-Trump activists traveled to Washington DC. Brawls broke out; four people were stabbed. That day, John Sullivan was escorted from an event at Black Lives Matter Plaza in Washington after he was identified by activists aware of the accusations against him. That same day, James Sullivan was similarly evicted from a pro-Trump event in Washington.

== Participation in the 2021 Capitol attack ==
John Sullivan participated in the storming of the United States Capitol. He wore a ballistic vest and gas mask, entering the building through a broken window. Sullivan took extensive video, including video of the killing of Ashli Babbitt. Sullivan could be heard saying "Dude, this shit's gonna go viral" after Babbitt's death.

Sullivan filmed himself chanting "we about to burn this shit down" and "we accomplished this shit. We did this together. Fuck yeah! We are all a part of this history", "We gotta get this shit burned", and "It's our house, motherfuckers!" He also used a megaphone and shouted support.

=== Speaker's Lobby ===
Outside the Speaker's lobby, Sullivan filmed himself telling others in the crowd that he has a knife. He later denied having a knife, claiming he "used that to navigate myself to the front of the crowd".

Upon reaching the front of the crowd, he told a law enforcement officer guarding the barricaded door: "We want you to go home. I’m recording and there’s so many people and they’re going to push their way up here. Bro, I’ve seen people out there get hurt. I don’t want to see you get hurt."

=== Public interviews ===
External videos
- Footage of John Sullivan answering questions immediately after the Babbitt shooting.

Moments after Babbitt was shot, Sullivan gave an impromptu interview with a streamer identifying as working for Infowars. Later that night, Sullivan and Jade Sacker appeared on CNN's Anderson Cooper 360°, showing Sullivan's footage of the Babbitt shooting.

=== Detention and FBI interview ===
On January 7, Sullivan was interviewed by FBI agents about the shooting. Sullivan said he is not affiliated with BLM or antifa, nor with the pro-Trump crowd, although he supports Black Lives Matter. When asked about the use of antifa hashtags in his social media posts, he rejected being associated with the group, but has stated that he, along with his group, is anti-fascist. He admitted to shouting support during the attack, but claimed he only did these things to "blend in" with the pro-Trump mob. His brother, James Sullivan, said that he sent the FBI tips about John Sullivan about a week after the attack.

On January 13, 2021, an arrest warrant with three counts related to the Washington, D.C., riot was signed by a magistrate judge. The affidavit was based on work by the Counterterrorism Section of the United States Department of Justice National Security Division and the United States Attorney for the District of Columbia. The affidavit stated that Sullivan entered the Capitol's west side by climbing through a broken window. He later approached another window and a knocking noise was heard, after which it was broken. Sullivan stated, "I broke it. My bad, my apologies. Well they already broke a window, so you know, I didn't know I hit it that hard. No one got that on camera." One charge, "40 U.S.C. § 5104(e)(2)(D)", is a specific crime of entering or remaining in the House of Congress without authorization.

=== Arrest and charges ===
Sullivan was arrested in Tooele County, Utah, and appeared before a judge on January 15, 2021. Two computers, two cell phones, and camera equipment were seized by the FBI. He was released with strict pre-trial conditions. He was released as the authorities did not have sufficient proof to keep him in custody, and under the conditions that he keeps a job where he has to work full-time; remains at home except to go to work, church or court; only posts to social media to request jobs; does not leave Utah and surrenders his passport to the authorities; does not work anymore with Insurgence USA though still being allowed to handle its financial transactions and tax returns; has a mental health evaluation; does not possess firearms.

=== Antifa conspiracy theory ===
Sullivan's involvement in the riots was cited by pro-Trump lawyer Rudy Giuliani and The Gateway Pundit as part of a conspiracy theory alleging antifa's involvement in the riots. Giuliani published a screen shot of a message from James Sullivan reading "I'm currently working with the FBI to expose and place total blame on John and the 226 members of antifa that instigated the Capitol 'riot'".

Federal authorities had not identified Sullivan as a member of antifa and the FBI had announced on January 8 there was no evidence of antifa involvement in the siege. BLM Utah had for months disassociated itself from Sullivan on concerns that he might be associated with the Proud Boys.

=== Claims of being a journalist ===
Sullivan has called himself a citizen journalist and claimed he was at the Capitol attack only as a photojournalist. An FBI affidavit disputes the claim he was a photojournalist, as he had no press credentials. Prosecutors allege that in December 2020, Sullivan publicly denied being a journalist.

Sullivan's own recording is described as a first-person documentary film he released on YouTube under the title Shooting and Storming of the US Capitol in Washington DC. J. Hoberman, a film critic writing in Artforum, reviewed Sullivan's film, describing it as "cinema as forensic evidence" and comparing it to the Zapruder film of the Kennedy assassination, while also characterizing it as a "gonzo reportage". Parts of the footage were used in the second impeachment trial of Donald Trump. CNN, NBC News, Australian Broadcasting Corporation and The Washington Post were among the media outlets that paid Sullivan for his video.

When entering the Capitol, Sullivan was accompanied by Jade Sacker, a Los Angeles-based independent documentary filmmaker, who was filming John Sullivan as part of a documentary on him and his brother, James.

=== Conviction ===
Sullivan was convicted on November 16, 2023, by a jury in the District of Columbia of five felonies and two misdemeanor charges related to his conduct during the January 6, 2021, breach of the U.S. Capitol. On April 23, 2024, Sullivan was sentenced to six years in prison.

On January 20, 2025, the first day of the second presidency of Donald Trump, Sullivan was pardoned along with nearly every other participant in the Capitol attack.

== See also ==
- List of cases of the January 6 United States Capitol attack (M-S)
- Criminal proceedings in the January 6 United States Capitol attack
- List of people granted executive clemency in the second Trump presidency
