= Talia Jane =

American writer and labor activist

- Born: Talia Ben-Ora; 1990 or 1991 (age 35–36)
- Education: California State University, Long Beach (BA)
- Occupation: Journalist
- Known for: Labor activism

Talia Jane (born Talia Ben-Ora in 1990 or 1991) is an American writer and labor activist. They are known for bringing attention to minimum wage compensation across tech companies in the San Francisco Bay Area.

== Education and career ==
Jane attended community college until they transferred to California State University, Long Beach, where they earned a Bachelor of Arts in English literature.

== Activism at Yelp ==
In February 2016, Jane published an open letter on Medium to Jeremy Stoppelman, the chief executive officer of Yelp, where they worked as a customer service representative for Yelp's Eat24 food delivery service. The letter contrasted the minimum-wage hourly pay of their role and the high cost of living in the Bay Area, highlighting the workers' $12.25 hourly wages, the cost of housing and groceries, and poverty issues among their colleagues. Jane said the only housing they could afford with their pay was 30 miles east in Concord, and had no money left for food after rent and transportation to work.

They were fired shortly after they published the letter, the news of which garnered significant media attention. Jane was both credited for sparking an important conversation about living wages, and criticized for their method of delivery. In an analysis for the Washington Post, writer Malcolm Harris noted that Jane was "pilloried in the media as just another entitled millennial who wanted things handed to them" but noted of the resulting wage increase: "Many large labor actions have achieved less".

They said that they were told they were being terminated due to the Medium post, would receive severance of $1,000, and would not be allowed to return to work at Yelp. Stoppelman denied that Jane's termination was related to the letter, and a spokesperson for Yelp stated, "We do not comment on personnel issues." However, two weeks later, after former employee Jaymee Senigaglia wrote her own open letter, Yelp published justification for her termination on Twitter.

In April 2016, Yelp raised the pay of Eat24 customer service representatives from $12.25 to $14 an hour, added 11 paid holidays (up from zero), and increased the number of days of paid time off from 5 to 15. Yelp did not reference Jane in its announcement and said that changes had been in the works since quarter 4 2015 – three months before Jane published their letter. Employees at Yelp reportedly disputed this claim and believed Jane was the "whistleblower" who prompted the changes.

Jane was named one of Business Insider's 100 "most amazing and inspiring people in tech right now" as well as one of Inc's "25 Coolest Women in Silicon Valley," both of which credited their open letter for the subsequent conversations about living wages in Silicon Valley.

== Journalism ==
Jane is a freelance journalist and has contributed to Mic, Vice, Allure, Elle, and The Guardian. They also worked as a writer for Full Frontal with Samantha Bee's trivia game This Is Not A Game: The Game.

As an independent reporter, in 2020, Jane attended protests in Manhattan following the death of football player Johnathan Price and later election protests in Washington, D.C. According to the U.S. Press Freedom Tracker, in late 2023, Jane faced harassment while reporting at pro-Israel demonstrations in Manhattan held following the October 7 attacks, and they were later that year hit with a book at a protest against a Drag Story Hour event in New York.

== Personal life ==
Jane grew up in Concord, California with their mother, Debra McClanahan, a practicing Wiccan, and near their father. At 10 years old, Jane unknowingly became an accomplice to spree killers Glenn Helzer, Justin Helzer, and Dawn Godman, after Jane's mother purchased movie tickets as an alibi for the trio. Their mother testified against the killers, and was later committed to a psychiatric ward; Jane went to live with their grandparents in Southern California. They later wrote about the experience.

In May 2019, Jane was the recipient of a sexually explicit message via Twitter that was sent to them by a Seattle Times reporter. The reporter was suspended by the Seattle Times and resigned from the paper on June 7, 2019.
