= Hassell v. Bird =

- Supreme Court of California

Argued Sept. 21, 2016
- Full case name: Dawn Hassell and Hassell Law Group vs. Ava Bird
- Citation(s): 247 Cal.App.4th 1336

Case history
- Prior history: Superior Court of San Francisco City & County, No. CGC-13-530525, Donald J. Sullivan, Judge
- Subsequent history: Time for Granting or Denying Review Extended Hassell v. Bird, 2016 Cal. LEXIS 10330 (Cal., Sept. 14, 2016) Review granted by Hassell v. Bird, 208 Cal. Rptr. 3d 284, 381 P.3d 231, 2016 Cal. LEXIS 7914 (Cal., 2016) Request granted Hassell v. Bird, 2016 Cal. LEXIS 8407 (Cal., Oct. 12, 2016) Request granted Hassell v. Bird; Yelp, Inc., 2016 Cal. LEXIS 10250 (Cal., Dec. 5, 2016) Request granted Hassell v. Ava Bird/Yelp, 2017 Cal. LEXIS 1418 (Cal., Feb. 14, 2017)

Holding
- 1. In a defamation case arising from the publication of an online review of a lawyer, due process did not bar a removal order, despite the lack of notice and hearing to the nonparty website where the review was posted, in part because the order treated the website as the administrator of a forum used to publish defamatory reviews, not as a publisher.; 2. The order to remove three statements was not a prior restraint, but the order to remove subsequent comments was an overbroad restraint on speech 3. The Communications Decency Act of 1996, 47 U.S.C.S. § 230, did not bar the trial court from issuing the removal order because the order did not impose any liability on the website.; 4. For purposes of standing to appeal, the site was aggrieved by the removal order because the order directly affected the operation of its business and potentially carried some pecuniary consequence.

Court membership
- Chief Justice: Tani Gorre Cantil-Sakauye

Laws applied
- Communications Decency Act, 47 U.S.C § 230

Hassell v. Bird was a case heard within the California court system related to a court-ordered removal of a defamatory user review of a law firm from the Yelp website. The case, first heard in the California Court of Appeals, First District, Division Four, unanimously ruled in favor of the law firm, ordering Yelp to remove the review in 2016. Yelp refused to remove the review and appealed the decision. In July 2018, the California Supreme Court reversed the order in a closely divided 4-3 decision, stating that Yelp's position fell within Section 230 of the Communications Decency Act as a publisher of user material, and was not required to comply with the trial court's removal order. However, the part of the trial court's decision that ordered the reviewer to remove the defamatory review and pay a monetary judgement were left intact. The Supreme Court of the United States denied to hear the appeal, leaving the California Supreme Court's decision.

== Background ==
In the summer of 2012, San Francisco attorney Dawn Hassell began to represent client Ava Bird in a personal injury claim. Hassell represented Bird for only 25 days after Bird signed an attorney-client fee agreement on August 20, over which Hassell had initiated 15 communications, 12 of those in writing, to Bird, and spoken to Bird's insurance provider at least twice, but Bird did not respond to those requests. Hassell withdrew from Bird's case on September 23, 2012 due to Bird's lack of communications.

Bird then published a maliciously false review of Hassell's firm on Yelp in January 2013 (Bird's first review), under the name "Birdzeye B. Los Angeles, CA." She rated her experience with Hassell as one out of five stars, and untruthfully claimed that Hassell's firm neglected to contact the involved insurance company and failed to communicate with Bird herself or the insurance agency. Upon seeing these reviews, Hassell reached out to Bird, requesting that she remove the defamation from the website. Bird responded by email refusing to remove her review, and threatened to post more reviews. Hassell did not respond to this email.

Soon after, another negative one-star review of Hassell's firm appeared on Yelp in February 2013. This review was written under a different name: "J.D. Alameda, C.A." Hassell had never represented a client with the initials J.D., and given Bird's threats, she suspected Bird wrote this review because of its similarities in writing style with the January 2013 review. Hassell reached to Yelp but they refused to resolve the matter or remove any of the content posted by Bird.

Hassell then filed a lawsuit against Bird on April 17, 2013, claiming that Bird's reviews were defamatory and injurious to Hassell's business reputation. Bird acknowledged the lawsuit in an update to her first review and then ignored the lawsuit and failed to appear in court. Hassell then filed a default judgment against Bird and requested the Court order Bird and Yelp to delete her reviews. The court, after reviewing extensive briefing showing the content was malicious and false, and hearing testimony at the hearing where Bird again failed to appear, issued such an order. But neither Bird nor Yelp complied.

During the lawsuit, on April 29, 2013, Bird—under the "Birdzeye" username—posted another Yelp review in response to her first review in January and addressing Hassell's lawsuit. She claimed that Hassell's legal action aimed to "threaten, bully, intimidate, [and] harass me into removing the review."

== Lower court ruling ==
On January 14, 2014, a default prove-up hearing was held before the Honorable Donald Sullivan. Bird, who failed to file an answer to the lawsuit, refused to appear. After a hearing and receipt of evidence and testimony, Hassell was awarded $557,918.75 in general and special damages against Bird, but was denied punitive damages.

The court also issued an order ordering Ava Bird to remove all defamatory Yelp reviews published about Hassell Law Group, and urging her to refrain from posting online any "written reviews, commentary, or descriptions" of Hassell or Hassell Law Group. Additionally, Yelp.com was ordered to remove Bird's reviews within 7 days of the court's order.

The courts cited Section 230 of the Communications Decency Act, 47 U.S.C § 230 (Section 230 of the CDA) which offers protection for the blocking and screening of offensive material. Though it states that websites cannot be held accountable as the publisher or speaker of third party user-posted content, the Court of Appeal ruled that the removal order ordering Yelp to remove the defamatory content did not violate section 230 because it did not impose any liability on Yelp as a publisher of third party content, it only ordered Yelp to remove those specific reviews the lower court declared to be defamatory.

This judgment was finalized on March 16, 2014. Yelp then appealed to the Supreme Court of California on May 23, 2014, to set aside the judgment. Yelp claimed it was an "aggrieved party," arguing that its right to due process was violated because Hassell had not sued/identified Yelp as a party defendant, that the CDA barred the lower court's order against Yelp, and that Bird's First Amendment rights were violated because Hassell had not adequately proved that Bird's comments were defamatory.

The Supreme Court of California agreed to consider the lawsuit on September 21, 2016.

== Issues before the California Supreme Court ==
The application of the Communications Decency Act by the Appeals court raised concerns throughout the Internet community due to its potential impact on republishers, sites that host user-content but otherwise do not regulate it. A petition for review to the Supreme Court of California was filed on July 18, 2016, arguing that while Section 230 of the CDA defines the user of a computer service or website as the "publisher or speaker of any information provided by another information content provider," the lower court's ruling was wrongly holding Yelp.com accountable for Bird's speech based on Yelp's online publication of her content.

The Appeals court decision had effects on other online communities after its issuing. Glassdoor.com, a website similar to Yelp that allows users to anonymously rate and review their employers, claimed in an amicus brief that since Hassell was published, they began receiving more demand letters from users to remove unfavorable reviews. Airbnb, another Internet-based business that depends on third party user-posted reviews, also petitioned the California Supreme Court for review, arguing that the opinion in Hassell would effectively weaken the legal protections granted to websites in Section 230 of the CDA, by holding websites accountable for third party user-posted content.

The case was argued before the California Supreme Court on April 3. The California Supreme Court issued its decision on July 2, 2018, partially reversing the lower court's decision to vacate the order on Yelp to remove the review. The court found that the lower court had employed too narrow a ruling on the Communication Decency Act in judging Yelp's participating in the case. The court wrote that if it had upheld the lower court's order on Yelp, it would have created a means to legally bind republishers for content they did not create. They wrote that this would "interfere with and undermine the viability of an online platform" and "the unique position of internet intermediaries convinced Congress to spare republishers of online content ... from this sort of ongoing entanglement with the courts." The California Supreme Court left intact the order that Bird must remove the review themselves from Yelp and pay a fine.

== United States Supreme Court ==
The law firm of Charles Harder, representing Hassell following the California Supreme Court decision, filed a petition of writ of certiorari with the Supreme Court of the United States in October 2018 challenging the decision related to the application of Section 230 of the CDA. Harder's firm had been involved in a number of defamation cases, including both President Donald Trump and Melania Trump. The Supreme Court denied to hear the case, without comment, in orders issued January 22, 2019, leaving the California Supreme Court's decision in place.
