= United Citizens' Alarm =

American right-wing militia group

The United Citizens' Alarm (UCA, formerly the Utah Citizens' Alarm) is an armed right-wing militia group in Utah, United States. Founded in 2020 in opposition to Black Lives Matter (BLM), the group has been considered a part of the U.S. extreme right, with some members being associated with the far-right Proud Boys.

== History ==
The group's founder is Casey Robertson. A former Democrat turned pro-Trump Republican, Robertson's parents both work in U.S. law enforcement). He founded the group in opposition to a BLM counter-demonstration to a police protest, when a driver of an SUV drove through the crowd and was subsequently shot. The group's main organization was its Facebook page and members of the militia include former military and law enforcement individuals, and have faced no resistance from authorities or law enforcement.

Robertson has pushed conspiracy theories relating to anti-fascist protesters (antifa) and BLM, claiming that they have both been funded by the Islamic State (ISIS) to destroy American values as fifth columnists. UCA believes that there will be an upcoming civil war instigated by underground militant forces, including BLM and antifa, and that it will be the job of UCA and the militia movement to defend the U.S. from attack.

== Methods ==
The group's tactics are suppressive; UTA members go to rallies throughout Utah with 30–1,000 members, wearing military-style uniforms and bulletproof vests while they observe rallies. They claim that they are at these groups to prevent damage to property, and openly carry weapons with them, taking advantage of both the Second Amendment and Utah's open carry laws.

This has been seen by civil rights groups as having a chilling effect on canceling protests, as organizers fear that the presence of armed UTA members would lead to violence. Jason Stevens, of American Civil Liberties Union chapter in Utah, drew parallels between these tactics and intimidation tactics used against black protesters in the civil rights movement of the 1960s. Their paramilitary tactics have been criticized by the Institute for Constitutional Advocacy and Protection at Georgetown University Law Center, and has raised concerns over voter intimidation in the presidential election of 2020.

In response, some groups and individuals – such as BLM activist and guns' rights proponent John Sullivan and his group, Insurgence USA – brought arms to protests for self-defence, and encouraged other protesters to do the same.

On July 22, 20 armed UCA members confronted Sullivan at an armed protest. On October 2, 2020, a UCA counter-protester was charged with assault at a BLM rally.

== On social media ==
In August 2020, Utah Citizen's Alarm group was on Facebook – which had nearly 20,000 members at the time – was banned for violating Facebook's new policy on groups, which aimed to "[take] action against Facebook pages, groups and Instagram accounts tied to offline anarchist groups that support violent acts amidst protests, U.S. based militia organizations and QAnon." Robertson denied that UCA supported violence.
