= Billion Dollar Bully =

- Directed by: Kaylie Milliken
- Produced by: Kaylie Milliken; Mellissa Wood
- Cinematography: Jon Ingalls
- Edited by: Steven Sandhu
- Music by: Steve Barkwill
- Production company: Prost Productions
- Distributed by: Virgil Films
- Release date: May 21, 2019
- Country: United States
- Language: English

Billion Dollar Bully is a documentary film about Yelp and its alleged business practices. The film was directed by Kaylie Milliken and produced by Prost Productions. The film was released on May 21, 2019.

== Production background ==
Milliken said that she decided to take on the project when her doctor told her that she had begun seeing negative Yelp reviews for her practice that she was unable to reconcile with actual patient visits, and that she had become convinced that some of the reviews were fictitious when a complaint was posted describing symptoms she had never seen in her practice.

Business Insider reported that on the day following the film's initial press release and Kickstarter campaign, Yelp stock declined by 4% in afternoon trading.

The Hollywood Reporter announced on August 12, 2015, that public relations specialist Michael Levine, would become the executive producer for Billion Dollar Bully. Levine has represented 58 Academy Award winners, most notably including Charlton Heston. The film has an unspecified budget, and some backers were requesting that they remain unnamed.

== Yelp response ==
An unnamed spokesperson for Yelp, commented to Business Insider, "The director has a conflict of interest, as she has a history of trying to mislead consumers on Yelp. There is no merit to the claims they appear to highlight, which have been repeatedly dismissed by courts of law, investigated by government regulators, including the FTC, and disproven by academic study." Milliken, however, has since responded to Yelp's allegations, citing the fact that the reviews in question had appeared before she and her husband were married and that repeated reviews were submitted due to a misunderstanding.

== Legal background ==
In Levitt v. Yelp! Inc. (2011), Judge Edward Chen, found that removal of positive reviews, or re-ordering of reviews, fell within the Section 230 of the Communications Decency Act's "traditional editorial functions." Additionally, the firm's motive and ethical underpinnings are irrelevant under Section 230's editorializing allowance. Judge Chen concluded: "The Ninth Circuit has made it clear that the need to defend against a proliferation of lawsuits, regardless of whether the provider ultimately prevails, undermines the purpose of section 230."

This judgment was appealed, and in 2014 the Ninth Circuit Court of Appeals found that businesses do not have a pre-existing right to have positive reviews, and that "threatening economic harm to induce a person to pay" therefore was not extortion under California law. In its primary ruling, the court held that, "We conclude, first, that Yelp’s manipulation of user reviews was not wrongful use of economic fear, and, second, that the business owners pled insufficient facts to make out a plausible claim that Yelp authored negative reviews of their businesses. Accordingly, we agree with the district court that these allegations do not support a claim for extortion."(p. 12) Secondarily, "In sum, to state a claim of economic extortion under both federal and California law, a litigant must demonstrate either that he had a pre-existing right to be free from the threatened harm, or that the defendant had no right to seek payment for the service offered. Any less stringent standard would transform a wide variety of legally acceptable business dealings into extortion."(p. 18)

Eric Goldman, writing for Forbes Magazine, explains that extortion by economic threat is a narrow construct and that this ruling only addresses extortion. Other 2014 pending cases against Yelp included false advertisement, and securities fraud.

After the Federal Trade Commission revealed a number of complaints, shareholders are taking Yelp to court, claiming Yelp artificially inflated the price of stock for its executive's benefit.

The Class Action lawsuit, being led by investor Joseph Curry, focuses on Yelp's "first-hand" reviews. The suit says Yelp required businesses "to pay to suppress negative reviews," and then lied about the practice.

== Crowdfunding campaigns ==
Billion Dollar Bully surpassed its initial Kickstarter funding goal of $60,000 by 150%. Subsequent campaigns were held during the production phase, including an Indiegogo campaign.
