= Jeremy Stoppelman =

American business executive

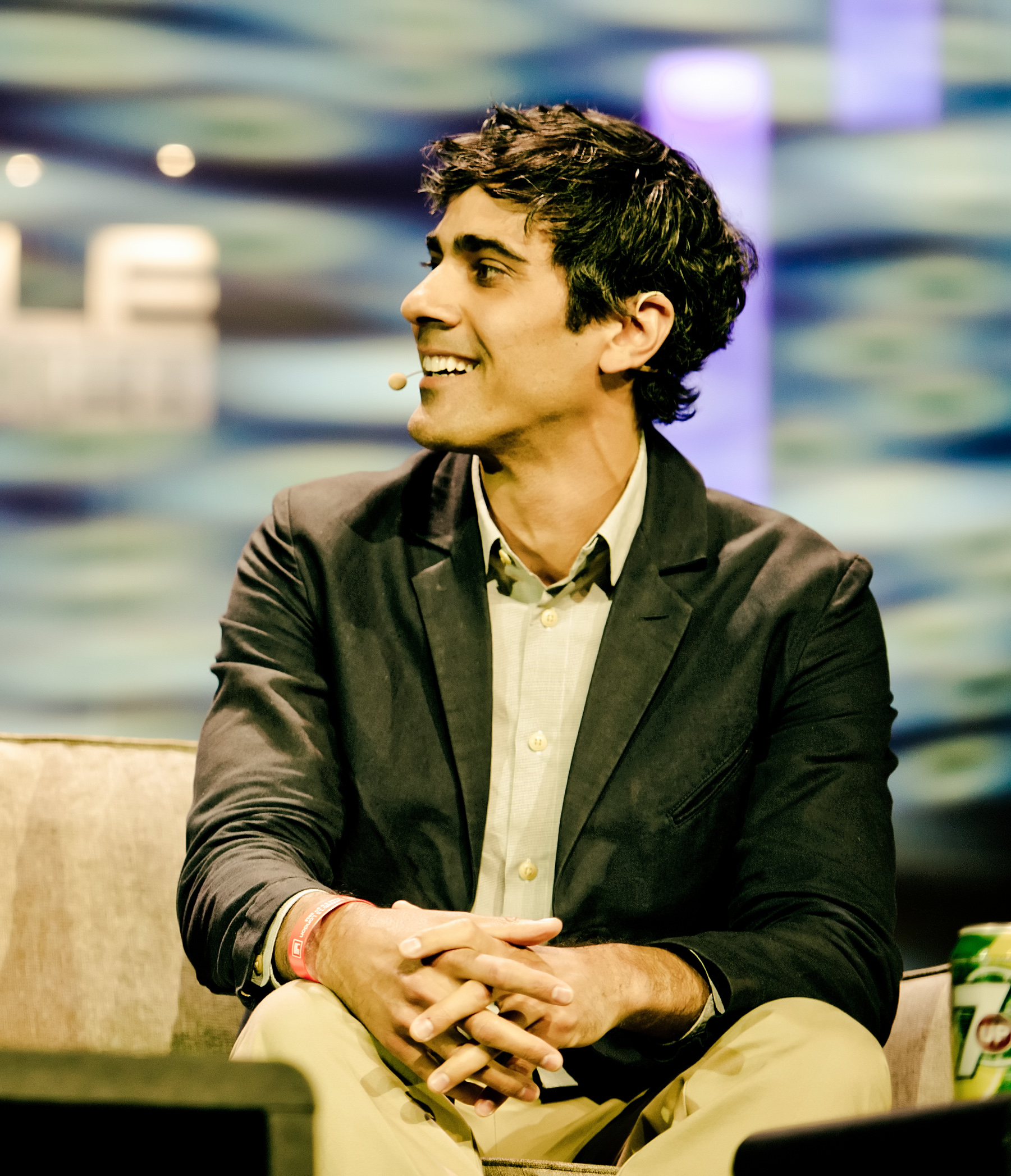
- Stoppelman in 2013
- Born: November 10, 1977 (age 48); Arlington, Virginia, US
- Education: University of Illinois Urbana-Champaign (BS); Harvard University
- Occupation: CEO of Yelp
- Website: yelp.com/management

Jeremy Stoppelman (born November 10, 1977) is an American business executive. He is the CEO of Yelp, which he co-founded in 2004. Stoppelman obtained a bachelor's degree in computer engineering from the University of Illinois at Urbana–Champaign in 1999. After briefly working for @Home Network, he worked at X.com and later became the VP of Engineering after the company was renamed PayPal. Stoppelman left PayPal to attend Harvard Business School. During a summer internship at MRL Ventures, he and others came up with the idea for Yelp Inc. He turned down an acquisition offer by Google and took the company public in 2012.

== Early life ==
Stoppelman was born in Arlington, Virginia, in 1977. His mother, Lynn, was an English teacher, and his father, John, was a securities lawyer. Stoppelman is Jewish. He attended Langley High School and a Reform temple as a child and had a bar mitzvah. As a child Stoppelman had an interest in computers and business and began investing in stocks at the age of 14. Stoppelman aspired to be a video game developer and took computer programming classes, where he learned the Turbo Pascal software programming system. He attended the University of Illinois at Urbana-Champaign and obtained a bachelor's degree in computer engineering in 1999. After graduating he took a job with @Home Network.

== Career ==
After four months of working for @Home Network, Stoppelman accepted a position as an engineer at X.com, which later became PayPal. It was here that Stoppelman met businessman Max Levchin, who later became an investor in Stoppelman's company, Yelp Inc. Stoppelman became the V.P. of engineering at PayPal, and is one of a group of PayPal's early employees sometimes referred to as the PayPal Mafia.

Stoppelman left PayPal after its 2003 acquisition by eBay and attended Harvard Business School for one year. During Stoppelman's school break Levchin persuaded Stoppelman to do an internship at the business incubator, MRL ventures.

=== Yelp ===
In the summer of 2004, Jeremy Stoppelman got the flu and had a hard time finding recommendations for a local doctor. He and former PayPal colleague, Russel Simmons, who was also working at MRL Ventures, began brainstorming on how to create an online community where users could share recommendations for local services. Stoppelman and Simmons pitched the idea to Levchin who provided $1 million in initial funding. Under Stoppelman's leadership, Yelp grew to a market capitalization of $4 billion and hosted 138 million user reviews. It has also come under significant scrutiny for its business practices, which have been called exploitative.

Steve Jobs called Stoppelman in January 2010 in an effort to persuade him to turn down an acquisition offer by Google and in March 2012 Stoppelman rang the bell for the New York Stock Exchange after Yelp went public. According to Stoppelman, the biggest challenge at Yelp has been "the same problem Google faces in its rankings." Business owners have been suing reviewers that leave negative reviews and raising allegations that Yelp tampers with reviews to favor companies that advertise, leading to legal troubles for the company. In February 2013, Stoppelman accepted a salary of $1, though he continues to earn income from the investment of his 11 percent interest in the company.

Stoppelman has a hands-on management style and sits at a desk among his employees. In 2016, an open letter on Medium to Stoppelman by a San Francisco employee of Yelp subsidiary Eat24, Talia Jane, went viral, describing how she and her coworkers struggled on their wages to afford groceries or winter heating in the Bay Area. She was immediately fired, though Stoppelman said this was not due to the letter. Yelp increased wages and benefits for low-level employees two months later.

In June 2022, following the COVID-19 pandemic, Stoppleman praised fully remote work, eliminating mandatory time in the office, and announced plans to close 450,000 square feet of office space in New York City, Washington, D.C., and Chicago.

== Personal ==
Stoppelman is a "voracious" non-fiction reader, and his brother Michael previously worked at Yelp as Senior Vice President of Engineering. As of 2012, Stoppelman had written over one-thousand Yelp reviews. As of 2011, his net worth was estimated to be $111 million to $222 million.

=== Political activism ===
Stoppelman advocates for fewer zoning restrictions in order to allow denser housing in the Bay Area as a way of mitigating the California housing shortage. For example, he supports the YIMBY (yes in my backyard) movement. He was also a prominent supporter of a bill that would allow denser housing near public transit routes. He lobbied other tech executives to join him in encouraging local governments to build more housing near universities. He also speaks about affordable housing at public events and donates to related causes.

Stoppelman advocates for more aggressive enforcement of antitrust regulations against Google and other technology companies. He accuses Google of having a monopoly in digital maps, online search engines, and reviews. He is also one of the few male CEOs of a public company to be a public advocate for reproductive rights.
