= Killing of Ashli Babbitt =

2021 shooting in the United States Capitol

- Part of the law enforcement response to the January 6 United States Capitol attack
- Babbitt prior to the January 6 United States Capitol attack
- Date: January 6, 2021
- Time: 2:44 pm (UTC-5)
- Location: United States Capitol, Washington, D.C., U.S.; 38°53′23″N 77°00′40″W
- Type: Killing by a law enforcement officer
- Cause: Deadly force used by officer guarding members of Congress from the Capitol insurrection rioters
- Participants: Michael Byrd

On January 6, 2021, Ashli Babbitt, a 35-year-old American United States Air Force veteran and pool supply owner, was fatally shot by an officer during the attack on the United States Capitol. She was part of a mob of supporters of then-outgoing U.S. president Donald Trump who stormed the United States Capitol seeking to overturn his defeat in the 2020 presidential election. She was a supporter of QAnon, a far-right conspiracy theory.

Despite multiple warnings not to proceed, Babbitt attempted to climb through a shattered window beside a barricaded door into the House Speaker's Lobby, at which point she was shot in the shoulder by United States Capitol Police (USCP) Lieutenant Michael Byrd. After a USCP emergency response team administered aid, Babbitt was transported to Washington Hospital Center, where she died from her injuries. Although some media reports described Babbitt as unarmed at the time of the shooting, a crime scene examination report revealed that a pocketknife was found in Babbitt's pants pocket. The USCP deemed that the shooting was "lawful and within Department policy" and "potentially saved Members [of Congress] and staff from serious injury and possible death".

Babbitt has been considered a martyr by Donald Trump and his supporters. In May 2025, a wrongful death lawsuit was settled with Babbitt's family for nearly $5 million. The settlement came after Trump said he would look into whether the government should settle with the family.

== Background ==
=== Attempts to overturn the 2020 election ===
After Joe Biden won the 2020 United States presidential election, then-incumbent Trump pursued an aggressive and unprecedented effort to overturn the election, with support and assistance from his campaign, his proxies, his political allies, and many of his supporters. These efforts culminated in the United States Capitol attack on January 6, 2021, the day set for Congressional certification of the Electoral College vote count.

=== Life and views of Ashli Babbitt ===
Babbitt, 35 years old at the time of her death, was raised in a mostly apolitical family near San Diego, California. In 2004, she enlisted in the United States Air Force, where she served 12 years; while on active duty, she met her first husband, Staff Sergeant Timothy McEntee. Babbitt had been deployed at least eight times by 2014, including in Afghanistan, Iraq, Kuwait, and Qatar; from 2010 onward, she served in the Air National Guard. Six of her years in service were spent in a "Capital Guardians" unit of the District of Columbia Air National Guard, whose mandate is to defend the Washington, D.C., region and respond to civil unrest. In 2014 Babbitt served as a "mentor" to less-experienced airmen about to go on their first deployment. She reached the rank of senior airman, a "relatively low rank" for a 12-year veteran according to The Washington Post.

From 2015 to 2017, near the end of her service, she supplemented her income by working as security at the Calvert Cliffs Nuclear Power Plant in Maryland. There, she met Aaron Babbitt, who later became her second husband. She filed for divorce from her first husband in 2018.

In 2016, she faced criminal charges of reckless endangerment in Maryland after she allegedly repeatedly smashed her SUV into a vehicle being driven by a former girlfriend of Aaron Babbitt. Citing ongoing harassment, the victim obtained multiple judicial orders forbidding Ashli any contact with her.

In 2018, Babbitt moved back to California with her second husband and they purchased a pool servicing business. She worked there with her brother and several other relatives.

Babbitt voted for Barack Obama at least once: asked by another Twitter user on November 15, 2018, if she had "supported Obama the same way [she] supported Trump?" she replied "[...] yes I did [...] I think Obama did great things ... he jacked some shit up... but I think he did do a lot of good ... at a time where we needed him. I voted for him!" She later registered as a Libertarian.

According to her brother, Babbitt became frustrated with such issues as the number of homeless people in San Diego and the difficulties of running a small business. As she struggled professionally, she came to embrace the radical right. On July 1, 2019, a judge issued a $71,000 judgment against her pool business for failing to repay a loan; around the same time, she supported Donald Trump and started following and promoting conspiracy theories. In November 2019, Babbitt tweeted about Pizzagate, a conspiracy theory that senior Democrats were operating a child sex-trafficking ring. By February 2020, Babbitt publicly supported QAnon, a broader far-right conspiracy theory that expanded Pizzagate's claims by adding the concept of a worldwide cabal of Satan-worshipping child abusers whom Trump is secretly fighting. One customer recalled having stopped doing business with Babbitt's company in 2020, after Babbitt unexpectedly delivered a political rant over the telephone.

Babbitt was highly active on social media through her Twitter handle @CommonAshSense. She seldom posted original content: most of her posts were retweets, frequently of messages from conservative and right-wing figures like Michael Flynn and Jack Posobiec, and conservative news sites like Right Side Broadcasting. According to Marc-André Argentino, a researcher studying QAnon and other extremist groups, Babbitt was not "a leader or major influencer within the QAnon movement", and was not involved in selling QAnon-themed merchandise. She had tweeted regularly about the conspiracy theory since February 2020. Babbitt posted about 50 times a day on Twitter; on Election Day, she posted 77 times.

After the election, Babbitt rejected the results and began supporting the Stop the Steal movement. On January 1, 2021, Babbitt announced plans to travel to DC for January 6.

A central belief among QAnon believers is that Trump was planning a massive sting operation on the "cabal", with mass arrests of thousands of cabal members to take place on a day known as "The Storm". On January 5, 2021, the day before the assault on the Capitol, Babbitt tweeted:

Nothing will stop us ... they can try and try and try but the storm is here and it is descending upon DC in less than 24 hours ... dark to light!

On January 6, prior to her arrival at the Capitol, Babbitt retweeted messages by Trump lawyer and QAnon promoter L. Lin Wood demanding that Vice President Mike Pence, Deputy Attorney General Rod Rosenstein and Supreme Court chief justice John Roberts resign and that charges be brought against Pence and Rosenstein.

=== Capitol attack ===
Starting in December, Trump repeatedly encouraged his supporters to protest in Washington, D.C., on January 6 in support of his campaign to overturn the election results, telling his supporters to "Be there, will be wild!" The Washington Post editorial board criticized Trump for urging street protests, referring to previous violence by some Trump supporters at two rallies and his statement during a presidential debate telling the Proud Boys to "stand back and stand by". Multiple groups of die-hard Trump supporters staged rallies in Washington on that day: Women for America First; the Eighty Percent Coalition (also at Freedom Plaza) (the group's name refers to the belief that approximately 80% of Trump voters do not accept the legitimacy of Biden's win); and "The Silent Majority" (a group organized by a South Carolina conservative activist). George Papadopoulos and Roger Stone, ardent allies of Trump, headlined some of the events. In addition to the formally organized events, the Proud Boys, other far-right groups, and white supremacists vowed to descend on Washington on January 6, with some threatening violence and pledging to carry weapons. Proud Boys leader Enrique Tarrio said that his followers would "be incognito" and would "spread across downtown DC in smaller teams".

As the certification process was underway, Trump gave a speech encouraging his supporters to march to the Capitol. Many of them did, whereupon they joined other protesters already gathered in the area and violently breached and stormed the Capitol, eventually entering the Senate chamber as well as numerous offices. The Congressional proceedings were suspended, the legislators were taken to secure locations, and Nancy Pelosi was evacuated.

It was reported that Pence had also been evacuated, but he remained in a secure location inside the Capitol.

Rioters occupied the empty Senate chamber while federal law enforcement officers defended the evacuated House floor. Capitol police were overrun by the rioters.

== Events ==
External videos
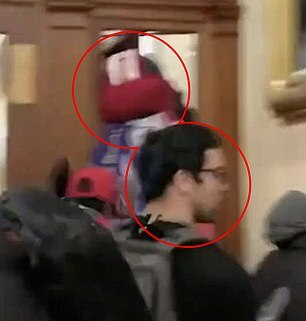
- After Zachary Jordan Alam (circled in red, bottom right) smashed the window with his helmet, Ashli Babbitt (circled in red, top left) attempted to breach the Speaker's Lobby by climbing through a window toward the fleeing congress.
- Footage of attempted breach of the Speaker's Lobby and subsequent shooting of Babbitt.

At 2:44 p.m., law enforcement were trying to "defend two fronts" to the House Chamber, and "a lot of members [of Congress] and staff that were in danger at the time". Pipe bombs had been discovered outside the Democratic National Committee and the Republican National Committee, and Capitol Police officers had been warned that many attackers were carrying concealed weapons.

Babbitt, wearing a Trump flag as a cape, was among several dozen rioters who approached the doors to the Speaker's Lobby, adjacent to the House chambers. Three uniformed officers were posted outside the Lobby where they were threatened by the crowd. One member of the mob yelled, "Fuck the Blue" (blue being a reference to the police). One officer guarding the doors told the others "They're ready to roll", and the three officers moved away from the barricaded doors leading to the Speaker's Lobby. No longer impeded by police, rioter Zachary Jordan Alam smashed a glass window beside the doors. On the other side of those doors, many lawmakers and staff were being evacuated by Capitol Police, but some were trapped in the House balcony.

On the other side of the doors and barricade, Lieutenant Michael Byrd was aiming his pistol at the broken window. Despite several calls of "he's got a gun", Babbitt, hoisted by two men, began to climb through the shattered window. She was then shot in her left anterior shoulder by Byrd and fell back among the other protesters. Babbitt had been warned not to proceed through the window: one witness recalled that "A number of police and Secret Service were saying 'Get back! Get down! Get out of the way!'; [Babbitt] didn't heed the call."

Many rioters immediately began to leave the scene, making room for a Capitol Police emergency response team to get in and administer aid, and Babbitt was transported to Washington Hospital Center where she later was declared dead. A report by the Metropolitan Police Department stated that she had been shot in the "upper portion of the left chest near the clavicle".

Some media reports described Babbitt as "unarmed" at the time of the shooting as she had no weapon in her hands, but according to a January 11, 2021, crime scene examination report by the D.C. Department of Forensic Sciences, the police "recovered a 'Para Force' folding knife in Ms. Babbitt's pants pocket" after she was shot.

U.S. representative Markwayne Mullin, a witness to Babbitt's attempted breach, said that Byrd "didn't have a choice" but to shoot, and that his action "saved people's lives".

The shooting was recorded on several cameras, and footage was widely circulated. John Earle Sullivan, among those who recorded footage of the shooting, was arrested for his role in the attack. Zachary Jordan Alam was also arrested for his role in the attack. MSNBC aired live video of Babbitt being rushed past the camera on a stretcher, outside the Capitol building.

== Investigation and legal ==
=== Investigation, and clearing of Byrd ===
Following the routine process for shootings by Capitol Police officers, the Metropolitan Police Department of the District of Columbia and the United States Department of Justice investigated Babbitt's death and made a determination that the shooting was "lawful and within Department policy". Upon clearing Byrd, USCP released a press statement saying his action "potentially saved Members and staff from serious injury and possible death". The USCP was not obliged to release Byrd's name as the USCP is not subject to the Freedom of Information Act.

Byrd made his name public in an August 2021 interview for NBC News. He said: "Once we barricaded the doors, we were essentially trapped where we were. There was no way to retreat. No other way to get out. If they get through that door, they're into the House chamber and upon the members of Congress." He stated that he had pulled the trigger as a "last resort" after the mob of protesters ignored his repeated orders to get back, and that he did not know at that moment whether Babbitt was armed or not, or that she was a woman. Byrd commented: "I know that day I saved countless lives. I know members of Congress, as well as my fellow officers and staff, were in jeopardy and in serious danger. And that's my job."

Byrd said his name had already been revealed in right-wing media and online forums and that he had received racist (Byrd is African-American) and violent threats, causing him to remain in hiding for several months.

=== Wrongful death lawsuit ===
On April 16, 2021, after family attorney Terry Roberts opened a GiveSendGo Crowdfunding campaign, Ashli's husband, Aaron Babbitt, petitioned the San Diego County Superior Court for probate of Ashli's will, intending to file a wrongful death lawsuit. Later, in February 2022, Roberts and the Maryland law firm, Roberts and Wood, whom were the initial recipients of $462,000 crowdfunding donations, withdrew from the case.

While the Federal Tort Claims Act has a two-year statute of limitations to file a claim with a government agency, Roberts claimed that the window to file a wrongful death lawsuit had not yet closed. He stated that the tolling of the statute of limitations could be determined instead by the deadlines set by state courts or due to court-imposed COVID restrictions.

On January 5, 2024, Judicial Watch filed a wrongful death lawsuit in the United States District Court for the Southern District of California on behalf of Babbitt's husband, Aaron Babbitt, and her estate, seeking $30 million in damages from the federal government in the ad damnum. As the plaintiff had filed an initial administrative claim with the United States Capitol Police on April 30, 2021, or 114 days after the killing, the timing of filing met the statute of limitations of the FTCA.

Later, in June 2024, the case would be transferred to the United States District Court for the District of Columbia. After initially being assigned to Judge Jia M. Cobb, the case was transferred to Judge Ana C. Reyes, a Biden appointee.

In March 2025, during his second presidency, Trump told Newsmax's Greg Kelly that he would "look into" whether the government should reach a settlement with Babbitt's family, claiming that Babbitt "was innocently standing there — they even say, trying to sort of hold back the crowd". Trump further stated that Babbitt's killing was "unthinkable" and "a disgrace".

On May 2, 2025, to settle a dispute with attorney Terry Roberts over payment for his work on the file, a court hearing was held confirming that a proposed settlement in principle had been reached. The details of the settlement were not made available, but a lawyer representing Babbitt's estate expected the formal settlement agreement to be signed within three weeks. On May 19, 2025, The Washington Post reported that the agreement in principle involved a settlement payment of $4.975 million, with about a third of that going to attorneys. U.S. Capitol Police Chief J. Thomas Manger sent a statement condemning the decision to settle the lawsuit.

== Reactions ==
Though they deplored Babbitt's death shortly after the event, few among Republican members of Congress and conservative media initially claimed any wrongdoing from law enforcement, or suggested that it warranted a backlash. Gradually, though, efforts were made to suggest that Babbitt was a martyr, or at least a patriot who was unjustly killed. Fox News hosts Tucker Carlson, Laura Ingraham and Mark Levin were sympathetic to Babbitt, with Levin understating Babbitt's actions and claiming that she had just been "walking around with the rest". U.S. representative Paul Gosar (R-AZ) said Babbitt had been "executed", later doubling down on that comment and adding that the police officer had been "lying in wait" and demanding to know his name. This drew a rebuke from then-representative Liz Cheney, who accused Gosar of "[smearing] the men and women who defended us". The Washington Post reported in June 2021, "increasingly, key elements of the conservative movement [were] suggesting Ashli Babbitt was a martyr". According to The New York Times, these included far-right extremists and white supremacists, some of whom also viewed Babbitt as a "freedom fighter". Democratic strategist Mark Burns said this was a "dangerous development for a Republican Party with members increasingly comfortable pressing for and defending political violence". Both he and David Frum in The Atlantic compared these efforts to the Nazi glorification of Horst Wessel.

Some QAnon supporters, including L. Lin Wood, have said that Babbitt is still alive and that her death was a "false flag" operation.

In October 2021, Trump recorded a video message arguing that "There was no reason Ashli should've lost her life that day. We must all demand justice for Ashli and her family." Trump has also referred to the police officer who shot Babbit as a "thug".

Russian president Vladimir Putin used the shooting of Babbitt to compare the actions of Capitol police with Russia's crackdowns on dissidents. Ernesto Araújo, the foreign minister of far-right Brazilian president Jair Bolsonaro, called for an investigation into Babbitt's death.

== Legacy ==
Babbitt's mother, Micki Witthoeft, became politically active following her daughter's death. In July 2021, she appeared at a Donald Trump rally where she was introduced by Paul Gosar and received a standing ovation from the crowd. During the rally, Trump expressed condolences to Witthoeft and acknowledged that Babbitt had died trying to salvage his presidency. Witthoeft later said in an interview that she was writing letters of support to January 6 arrestees and commented that her daughter had "made the ultimate sacrifice to bring attention to a stolen election. Half the country loves her and half the country hates her. It's weird to have your child belong to the world." Babbitt's husband told reporters that he does not want violence done in his wife's name, after being asked about comments made by Michael Braynard, the organizer of the Justice for J6 rally, which was dedicated in part to Babbitt.

Babbitt's name and the circumstances of her death have been invoked by various groups. Shortly after her death, Babbitt's name and image were used widely by extremist groups on social media groups, such as Parler and Telegram, with some using white nationalist and antisemitic themes.

In February 2022, a group of American truckers attempting to emulate the Canadian truckers protests against COVID-19 vaccine mandates told reporters that they were also protesting Babbitt's death along with issues such as COVID-19 restrictions and critical race theory.

In May 2023, during a round of tit for tat sanctions during the Russian invasion of Ukraine, Byrd was one of 500 Americans to have financial and travel restrictions imposed on them by the Russian Foreign Ministry, which said that the list included "those in ... law enforcement agencies who are directly involved in the persecution of dissidents in the wake of the so-called storming of the Capitol."

In August 2025, it was reported that the Air Force had offered military funeral honors to Babbitt's family.

== See also ==
- Timeline of incidents involving QAnon
