= Stanislav Levchenko =

Russian KGB major who defected to US (born 1941)

Stanislav Alexandrovich Levchenko (Russian: Станислав Александрович Левченко, born July 28, 1941) is a former Russian KGB major who defected to the United States in 1979. He obtained U.S. citizenship in 1989.

Levchenko was born in Moscow, obtained an education at the Institute of Asia and Africa of Lomonosov Moscow State University, and pursued graduate studies at the Institute of Oriental Studies of the USSR Academy of Sciences. His first KGB work came in 1968, after he had worked for the GRU for two years. He became fully employed by the agency in 1971. In 1975, he was sent undercover abroad, as a journalist working for the Russian magazine New Times (Novoye Vremya) in Tokyo, Japan.

Levchenko defected to the United States in October 1979, and was instrumental in detailing the KGB's Japanese spy network to the U.S government, including in Congressional testimony in the early 1980s.

After his defection, Levchenko supplied the names of about 200 Japanese agents who had been also defecting earlier. Included in his list were a former labour minister for the Liberal Democratic Party, Hirohide Ishida (石田 博英), and Socialist Party leader Seiichi Katsumata (勝間田 清一). Takuji Yamane of the newspaper Sankei Shimbun was also mentioned.

A Soviet court condemned Levchenko to death in 1981. Svetlana and Nikolai Ogorodnikov tried to hunt him down in the United States, but they were exposed in the Richard Miller spy case.

Levchenko published his English-language autobiography, On the Wrong Side: My Life in the KGB, in 1988. A Japanese version, KGB no Mita Nihon ("The KGB's View of Japan") was published in 1985.

== Japanese agents ==
- Gabba or Gabber

Takuji Yamane (Japanese: 山根 卓二).

- Hoover

Hirohide Ishida (Japanese: 石田 博英).

- Kant

Seiichi Katsumata (Japanese: 勝間田 清一).

- Krasnov

Ryuzo Sejima (Japanese: 瀬島 龍三). The code name "Krasnov" was Ryuzo Sejima, and was also a KGB official agent. Levchenko testified that Ryuzo Sejima was intimate with Ivan Kovalenko who was a boss of the agent activities in the Soviet Union against Japan. Ryuzo Sejima had disguised himself as the diplomatic courier called "Ryozo (良三) Sekoshi (瀬越)" and had gone to Moscow, Soviet Union from December 25, 1944 to February 24, 1945. Ryuzo Sejima moved out to Manchuria on July 1, 1945. In fact, Ryuzo Sejima had already known that the Soviet Union would attack to Manchuria and Japan at this time. Although Ryuzo Sejima was able to return to the mainland in Japan without any obstacle after World War II, he defected to and had stayed for 11 years in the Soviet Union. Yuriy Rastvorov who defected from the Soviet Union to the United States by way of Japan as well as Levchenko had trained Ryuzo Sejima as an defection agent in the Soviet Union. Ivan Kovalenko made friends with Japanese of Akira Kato（加藤 昭）, Yohei Sasakawa and Buntaro Kuroi（黒井 文太郎）, etc. in Japan, and has left the report about Ryuzo Sejima's secret. After Ryuzo Sejima returned from the Soviet Union to Japan on August 18, 1956, it was confirmed by the Japanese secret police that the KGB came in contact with Ryuzo Sejima in Japan. Ryuzo Sejima took part in the Toshiba-Kongsberg scandal. Ryuzo Sejima also worked with Yoshio Kodama who was intimate with the U.S. Government and the CIA. When Yoshio Kodama died on January 17, 1984, Ryuzo Sejima was also intimate with the U.S. Government and the CIA as if Ryuzo Sejima succeeded the work of Yoshio Kodama. Therefore, the double agent theories of the United States and the Soviet Union were referred to Ryuzo Sejima.

=== Ivan Kovalenko ===
Ivan Ivanovich Kovalenko (Russian: Иван Иванович(Ивановић) Коваленко; February 13, 1919 – July 27, 2005) was born in Vladivostok, RSFSR (now in Vladivostok, Russia). Kovalenko was in charge of a secretary and the interpreter of Aleksandr Vasilevsky who was Marshal of the Soviet Union during World War II. Kovalenko was also the deputy director of the International Department of the CPSU Central Committee and a firm proponent of dealing with Japan from a position of strength during the Cold War (1945–91). Kovalenko had visited Japan every year since 1956 to promote the relationship between Japan and the Soviet Union. As the agent in charge, Kovalenko was severely criticized for the defections of Rastvorov and Levchenko to the United States. His help of Japanese who had come in contact with the Soviet Union side also raised concerns regarding his loyalty as an agent for the Soviet Union. Kovalenko died of chronic diseases such as gangrene and diabetes mellitus at his home in Moscow, Russia. Kovalenko published "コワレンコ (Kovalenko), イワン (Ivan) (1996). 対日工作の回想. 文藝春秋 (Bungeishunju). ISBN 978-4-16-352260-9." about his short biography and memoirs of the agent activities in the Soviet Union against Japan.

== See also ==
- List of Eastern Bloc defectors
- List of KGB defectors
