= Big Motor =

Japanese used car dealer (1976–2024)

BIGMOTOR Co.

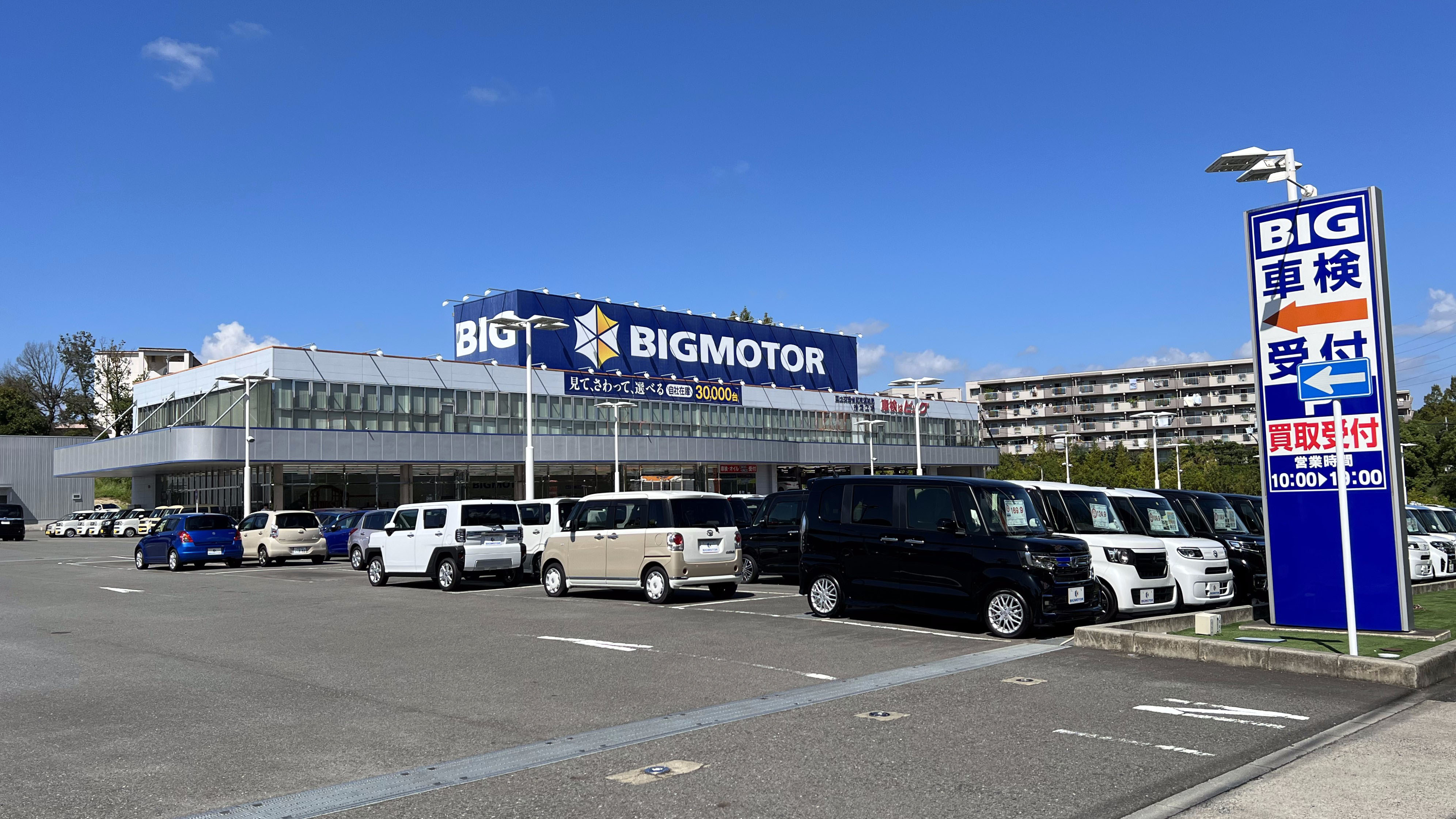
- A Big Motor dealership in Tama, Tokyo, Japan in 2023.
- Native name: 株式会社ビッグモーター
- Romanized name: Kabushiki gaisha Biggumōtā
- Type: Private
- Founded: 1976
- Founder: Hiroyuki Kaneshige
- Defunct: 2024
- Fate: Purchased by Itochu and rebranded as WECARS, liabilities handled by spinoff Balm Co.
- Headquarters: Tama, Tokyo, Japan
- Number of locations: 300 (2023)
- Area served: Japan
- Key people: Hiroyuki Kaneshige (President and CEO); Koichi Kaneshige (Executive Vice President)
- Operating income: ¥5.756 billion (2011)
- Net income: ¥3.325 billion (2011)
- Total assets: ¥56.322 billion (2011)
- Number of employees: 6,000 (2023)
- Website: Archived website

Big Motor (BIGMOTOR Co., Ltd. (Japanese: 株式会社ビッグモーター, Hepburn: Kabushiki gaisha Biggumōtā)) was a Japanese automotive retailer. Formerly the largest used car dealer in Japan, in 2023 the company was hit by a series of scandals and allegations of widespread, systematic insurance fraud. The allegations led to the resignation of its founder and president, Hiroyuki Kaneshige, Japan's Financial Services Agency revoking the company's insurance agent registration, and ultimately the sale of the company to Itochu general trading company, which rebranded the company into WECARS. The allegations also implicated insurance company Sompo Japan, which was accused of purposely ignoring the fraud to preserve its business relationship with Big Motor. The Big Motor scandal has prompted a greater reassessment of Japan's insurance industry and investigations into the largest Japanese insurance firms.

== History ==
Big Motor was founded in 1976 by Hiroyuki Kaneshige as Kaneshige Auto Center in Iwakuni, Yamaguchi Prefecture. In 1980, the company was renamed to Big Motor, and began opening stores elsewhere in Yamaguchi Prefecture, including Shimonoseki in 1984, Hōfu in 1985, and Kudamatsu in 1995. In 1998, the company opened its first dealership outside of Yamaguchi Prefecture in Utazu, in neighboring Kagawa Prefecture. Nevertheless, from 1997 to 2011 the company gradually downsized, reducing capital and dissolving subsidiaries.

Despite the downsizing in the previous decade, from 2012 to 2022 Big Motor experienced rapid growth, increasing sales eightfold and became the biggest used car dealership in Japan, capturing 15% of the market. The company's website boasted that the company was "number one in Japan in terms of the number of cars purchased for six consecutive years". The company also moved its headquarters from Jōtō-ku, Osaka, to the affluent Roppongi Hills, Tokyo, in 2015.

In 2023, the company had over 300 locations and 6,000 employees. The company offered a wide variety of car-related services, including car sales and leasing, vehicle inspection, vehicle insurance and repairs. The company employed celebrity branding, employing actors such as Ryuta Sato, Masahiko Nishimura and Nao Omori in commercials.

=== Sale and rebranding ===
WECARS

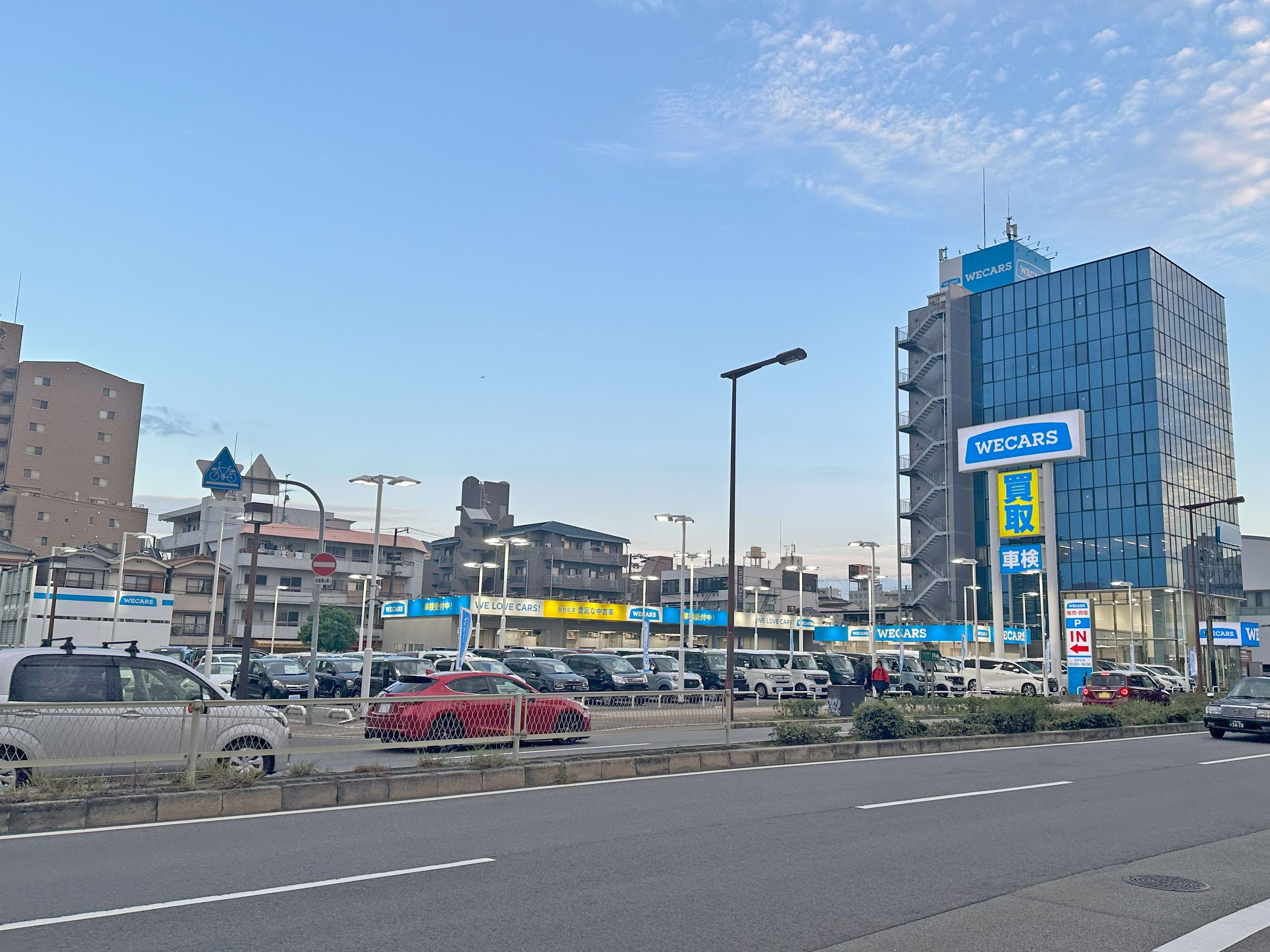
- Founded: 25 January 2024; 2 years ago (as JKH Co.)
- Headquarters: Kasumigaseki, Chiyoda, Tokyo
- Number of locations: ~250
- Key people: Shinjiro Tanaka (Representative director)
- Number of employees: ~4200
- Website: wecars.co.jp

BALM
- Founded: May 2024; 2 years ago
- Headquarters: Kaidori, Tama, Tokyo
- Key people: Shinji Izumi (Representative director)
- Parent: J-Will Partners Co., Ltd.
- Website: balm-info.jp

As a result of Big Motor's scandals and controversies which broke in July 2023, the company experienced administrative sanctions and an evaporation of consumer trust. Big Motor's sales plummeted to only about 10–20% pre-scandal levels, and the company began actively seeking a buyer, signing an agreement with Itochu general trading company on 17 November 2023. On 1 May 2024, Big Motor was sold to Itochu for ¥60 billion and the majority of its assets spun off into a new company, WECARS Co., with the remainder of Big Motor renamed to Balm Co. and tasked with paying off outstanding liabilities and loans. Itochu appointed Shinjiro Tanaka, an executive with experience at revitalizing companies as CEO, and Akiko Ito, former head of the Consumer Affairs Agency as a director to ensure accountability in the company. At the time of the rebranding, sales had only recovered to about 40% pre-scandal levels.

== Scandals and controversies ==
In 2023, Big Motor was the subject of a series of scandals, allegations and criminal investigations, chief of which was accusations of systematic and widespread insurance fraud, but also included purposefully poisoning municipal trees, predatory sales tactics, and a toxic corporate culture. Ultimately, the result of the scandal resulted in various sanctions and the sale of the company.

=== Insurance fraud ===
In June 2022, a whistleblower reported to the three largest insurance firms in Japan – Sompo Japan, Mitsui Sumitomo, and Tokio Marine Nichido – that Big Motor was making fraudulent insurance claims. At the request of the three insurance firms, in January 2023 Big Motor conducted an internal investigation, which concluded that the claims were mistakenly made. Although Sompo Japan accepted the findings and resumed business with Big Motor, Mitsui Sumitomo and Tokio Marine Nichido decided to conduct their own investigation with a panel of third-party lawyers and experts.

On 18 July 2023, the panel released their findings, accusing Big Motor of "systematically damaging automobiles and unnecessarily replacing parts" during repair work at their dealerships, as part of a culture of widespread insurance fraud. The panel, which surveyed 382 Big Motor employees said that nearly 30% admitted to deliberately shoddy repair work, with a further 60% saying that their supervisors directly ordered them to do so. The report alleged that Big Motor supervisors threatened repair shop employees with demotion unless they netted at least ¥140,000 in profits for each vehicle serviced, motivating employees to damage cars to net higher insurance claims. Employees allegedly used screwdrivers and sandpaper to scratch cars — and hit cars with socks stuffed with golf balls. In total, the report found that out of 8,427 Big Motor insurance claims since November 2022, at least 1,275 or 15% of them were fraudulent, with the average excess amount being ¥39,000. Reports emerged that Big Motor employees also concluded numerous fictional insurance contracts. After further investigation, the number of fraudulent claims was pegged at 65,000, or 30% of claims made over the past five to eight years.

Big Motor's internal investigation was later found to have been substantially false, with the results of eight out of the twelve individual cases investigated doctored by order of Big Motor executives.

=== Tree killing ===
Concurrent to the investigation into the insurance fraud, allegations emerged of Big Motor employees purposefully poisoning roadside trees and other vegetation with herbicide or simply cutting them down, with the Japanese police receiving over 50 damage reports to roadside trees. In one case, 17 trees which covered up advertising for the local Big Motor outlet in Ōta, Gunma Prefecture, were found dead, with traces of herbicide detected in the soil. In another case, 24 purple azaleas, valued at ¥308,200, were uprooted in front of a Big Motor outlet in Hiratsuka, Kanagawa Prefecture.

As a part of the investigation into the tree-killing, Big Motor headquarters and nine outlets were raided by Tokyo police in September 2023. Later, it emerged that Big Motor vice president and son of founder Hiroyuki Kaneshige, Koichi Kaneshige, personally led monthly "environmental inspections", which financially penalized employees for not cutting down trees as well as not maintaining "fanatical hygiene". On 4 March 2024, 13 former Big Motor employees including former Vice President Koichi Kaneshige were indicted for property destruction related to the killing of the trees.

=== Other controversies ===
In 2016, it was reported that Big Motor financially penalized sales managers who did not meet an aggressive insurance sales target of ¥250,000. When confronted about this, Big Motor acknowledged the report, but claimed that penalties were voluntary and not part of company policy.

In July 2023, during the investigation into the insurance fraud scandal, it was revealed through leaked messages that President Hiroyuki Kaneshige and his son, Vice President Koichi Kaneshige, regularly berated employees, calling one an "idiot" and another a "piece of junk". In another exchange, Koichi Kaneshige, in a conversation ostensibly about sales, typed the word "education" (教育) eighteen times, then "death penalty" (死刑) nine times, and then "education" eighteen times again, which was the subject of widespread ridicule by the Japanese public and was one of the winners of the Internet Buzzword Award. In the aftermath of the scandals, Hiroyuki and Koichi Kaneshige attempted to delete most of these messages.

=== Aftermath ===
On 18 July 2023, immediately after the publication of the report implicating Big Motor for systematic insurance fraud, Big Motor released a statement pledging to pay back the insurers and Transport Minister Tetsuo Saito announced an investigation into the company. On 25 July, Big Motor founder and president Hiroyuki Kaneshige resigned in a press conference, claiming that he and top executives had no knowledge of the fraud but admitted that he had neglected to create healthy corporate governance. On 17 August 2023, Big Motor's request to refinance ¥9 billion owed to leading Japanese banks was rejected in the wake of the scandal, throwing the finances of the company into turmoil.

On 19 September 2023, Japan's financial regulator, the Financial Services Agency (FSA) raided Big Motor's offices in Tama, Tokyo. On 24 October, Japan's Ministry of Land, Infrastructure, Transport and Tourism ordered Big Motor to suspend repair services in 34 locations, and continued investigations into the remainder of locations. On 30 November, the FSA rescinded Big Motor's insurance agent registration, preventing them from selling insurance to customers.

During the scandal, suspicion also fell on insurer Sompo Japan for accepting Big Motor's falsified internal investigation and resuming business with them, despite the other large insurers rejecting the internal investigation and conducting their own. During their 19 September raid on Big Motor's corporate offices, the Financial Services Agency simultaneously raided Sompo Japan's offices in Shinjuku, Tokyo. On 11 October 2023, the FSA released their report, alleging that Sompo Japan was aware that the internal investigation had been falsified, but had declined to act as to preserve their business relationship with Big Motor. It later emerged that Sompo had also staffed Big Motor with about 40 of its own employees, and that Big Motor had prioritized selling Sompo Japan insurance to its customers. In response to the allegations and an order from the Financial Services Agency to improve managerial practices, Sompo Japan's CEO Kengo Sakurada and President Giichi Shirakawa announced their resignations on 26 January 2024.

The scandal also prompted greater scrutiny in both the Japanese automotive retailing and insurance industries. On 3 October 2023, a whistleblower alleged that car retailer G-After employed similar insurance fraud tactics to Big Motor. Furthermore, the FSA's investigation of Sompo Japan revealed allegations that Sompo Japan, Mitsui Sumitomo, Tokio Marine Nichido and other leading Japanese insurers were price-fixing risk-sharing joint contracts in an unrelated scandal. The effects of the Big Motor scandal has been linked by The Diplomat to the Unification Church scandal after the assassination of Shinzo Abe and the allegations of bribery for the Tokyo 2020 Summer Olympics as part of a wider "crisis of confidence" in Japanese society.

As of July 2024, insurers have succeeded in adjusting 1,700 fraudulent claims out of an estimated 65,000 from the company inheriting Big Motor's liabilities, Balm Co., which has refused further adjustments of claims pending a court order.
