= Sojitz =

Japanese sogo shosha (general trading company)

Sojitz Corporation

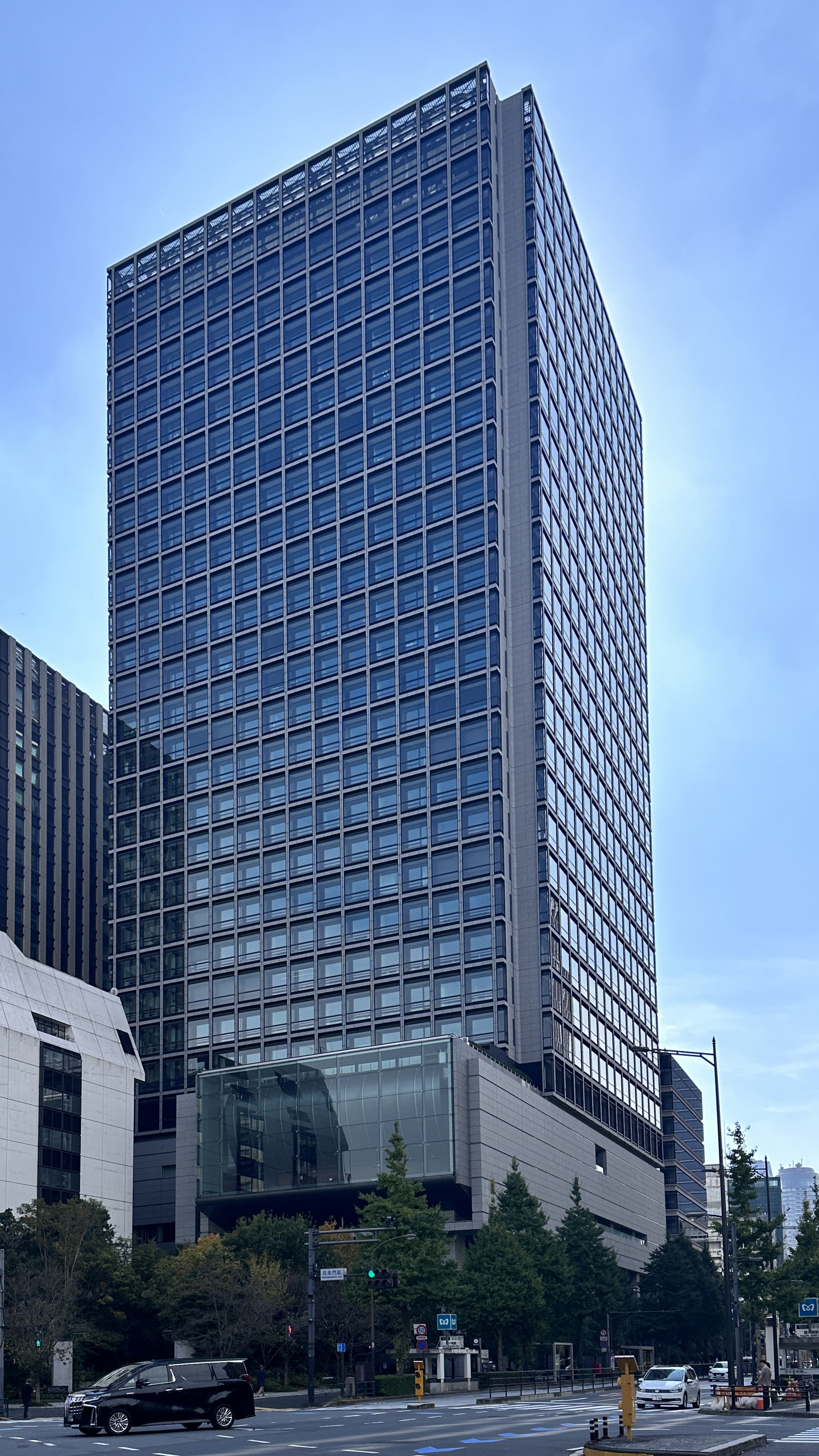
- Headquarters in Uchisaiwaichō, Chiyoda, Tokyo
- Native name: 双日株式会社
- Romanized name: Sōjitsu kabushiki gaisha
- Company type: Public
- Traded as: TYO: 2768
- Industry: Conglomerate (Sogo shosha)
- Founded: August 2004; 21 years ago
- Headquarters: Chiyoda, Tokyo, Japan
- Key people: Masayoshi Fujimoto (president & CEO)
- Revenue: ▲JP¥4,006 billion (2016)
- Net income: ▲JP¥36.5 billion (2016)
- Number of employees: 14,330 (2016)
- Website: www.sojitz.com/en/

Sojitz Corporation (Japanese: 双日株式会社, Hepburn: Sōjitsu Kabushiki-gaisha) is a sogo shosha (general trading company) based in Tokyo, Japan. It is engaged in a wide range of businesses globally, including buying, selling, importing, and exporting goods, manufacturing and selling products, providing services, and planning and coordinating projects, in Japan and overseas. Sojitz also invests in various sectors and conducts financing activities. The broad range of sectors in which Sojitz operates includes automobiles, energy, mineral resources, chemicals, foodstuff resources, agricultural and forestry resources, consumer goods, and industrial parks.

Sojitz was formed in 2004 by the merger of Nissho Iwai Corporation (日商岩井株式会社, Nisshō Iwai Kabushiki-gaisha) and Nichimen Corporation (ニチメン株式会社, Nichimen Kabushiki-gaisha). The name "Sojitz" is derived from the names of Nissho Iwai and Nichimen, both of which include the character "日" (sun). "Sojitz", literally meaning "twin suns", implies a merger of equals between the two companies. The corporate logo is a stylized version of the first character in its Japanese name.

== History ==
=== Nichimen ===
Beginning around 1878, the Japanese government promoted the development of cotton spinning as an initial means of developing modern industry in Japan in the wake of the Meiji Restoration. Japan's native raw cotton supply proved inadequate to meet demand, and there was only one Japanese importer of raw cotton at the time, making the industry highly reliant on foreign merchants. To improve this situation, a group of spinning companies established Japan Cotton Trading Co., Ltd. (日本綿花株式会社, Nippon Menka Kabushiki Kaisha) in Osaka in 1892 under the leadership of Tsuneki Sano, a 38-year-old former government official.

After the Russo-Japanese War, Nichimen expanded its business from importing. The company began cotton spinning operations in the Kwantung Leased Territory and established offices in China, Korea, Germany, Italy and the United Kingdom to supply local markets. In 1910, Nichimen opened a subsidiary in Fort Worth, Texas to enter the raw cotton trade in the United States. World War I strained cotton supply in Europe, boosting Nichimen's international business further. In the late 1910s the company expanded into South America and Africa, trading in cotton as well as wool, food products, and machinery.

The Great Depression harmed Nichimen's cotton business, spurring the company's diversification beyond cotton to trade in silk, rayon and other materials. During World War II, Nichimen was tapped by the Japanese military to manage production of flour, matches and starch. The company changed its name to Nichimen Enterprise (Nichimen Jitsugyo) in 1943 to reflect its more diverse business.

The largest zaibatsu trading companies were dismantled after the war, giving Nichimen an early lead among the sogo shosha in the 1950s and a six percent share of Japanese foreign trade by 1958. Nichimen became closely affiliated with Osaka-based Sanwa Bank in 1955, which financed all of Nichimen's domestic business. Nichimen was not the main trading company for the Sanwa keiretsu as that position was already held by Iwai & Co. Nichimen Jitsugyo.

By 1970, Nichimen was trading in steel, electronics, motor vehicles and fibers in addition to textiles. Nichimen served as the joint venture partner for Nabisco when it began operations in Japan in the 1970s. Nichimen Co., Ltd. changed its name to Nichimen Corporation in 1982. Nichimen, like other sogo shosha, was hit hard by the collapse of the Japanese asset price bubble in the early 1990s, and subsequently made a strategic shift from the "soft" businesses of lumber, food, and chemicals trading to the "hard" businesses of machinery, steel, and construction.

=== Nissho Iwai ===
Nissho Iwai was formed in 1968 by the merger of Nissho Company and Iwai Sangyo Company.

Nissho Company was founded in Kobe in 1902 as Suzuki & Company (ja:鈴木商店) under the leadership of Naokichi Kaneko (ja:金子直吉) when died this company's predecessor shop's founder, Iwajiro Suzuki (ja:鈴木岩治郎) (1837–1894). Suzuki was originally a sugar trading firm but later diversified into flour, steel, tobacco, beer, insurance, shipping and shipbuilding; it became the second Japanese member of the Baltic Exchange in London. Iwai & Company (ja:岩井商店) was founded as a steel trading firm in 1901 and established a number of prominent group enterprises including Daicel, Nisshin Steel, Tokuyama Soda, Kansai Paint and Fuji Photo Film. It changed its name to Iwai Sangyo Company in 1943.

Both Nissho and Iwai emerged as metals and machinery trading companies after World War II but were significantly smaller than the four largest sogo shosha competitors (Mitsubishi Corporation, Mitsui & Co., Itochu and Marubeni). Iwai was poorly managed after the war and was on the brink of failure in the early 1960s, while Nissho was profitable and successfully expanding overseas. The Japanese government directed the merger of the two companies in 1968, forming the fifth largest trading company in Japan (falling back to sixth place in 1972 behind Sumitomo Corporation). Sanwa Bank played a role in the merger and the combined firm became the trading arm of the Sanwa Group keiretsu.

Nissho Iwai was involved in a corruption scandal in 1979 after it passed on a 500 million yen bribe from McDonnell Douglas to the director general of the Japan Defense Agency in an attempt to influence the sale of F-4 Phantom aircraft to the Japan Air Self-Defense Force. In the wake of the scandal, one Nissho Iwai executive committed suicide by jumping from the company's headquarters building. The scandal was uncovered only three years after a similar scandal involving Lockheed and Marubeni conspiring to bribe Prime Minister Kakuei Tanaka.

In subsequent years, the company had a strong focus on liquefied natural gas and steel trading, as well as industrial project development.

=== Merger ===
Nichimen and Nissho Iwai consolidated on a holding company level in 2003 and consolidated their operating units in 2004, adopting the Sojitz name at that time. The merged holding company, Sojitz Holdings, combined with the merged operating company, Sojitz Corporation, in 2005.

== Current operations ==
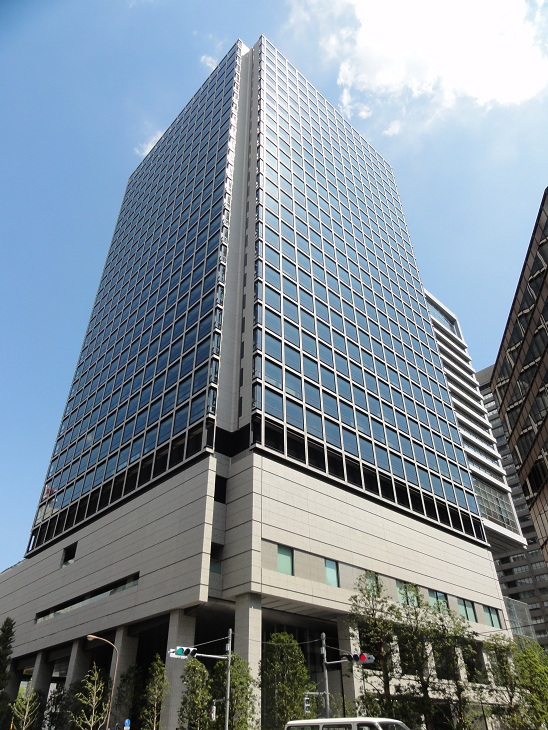
The current headquarters of Sojitz Corporation, Iino Building in Kasumigaseki, Chiyoda, Tokyo.

Today, the Sojitz Group consists of approximately 440 subsidiaries and affiliates located in Japan and throughout the world, and it is developing its general trading company operations in roughly 50 countries and regions across the globe.

Sojitz (through its subsidiary Sojitz Aerospace Company) is the largest seller of commercial aircraft in Japan, as it acts as a sales agent for both Boeing and Bombardier Aerospace. It distributes Mitsubishi Motors and Hyundai Motors automobiles in various countries, and also develops and operates power plants, industrial plants in various countries. In 2013 it received an order to develop a section of the Western Dedicated Freight Corridor between Delhi and Mumbai in India. The Sojitz Aerospace Company also acts as Sojitz's primary arm for defense related business.

Sojitz has also invested in Hyundai Nishat, the Pakistani arm of Hyundai Motors in partnership with Nishat Group.

Sojitz owns oil and natural gas concessions in the North Sea, Gulf of Mexico, Qatar, Gabon, Egypt, and Brazil, and distributes nuclear fuel in Japan for Orano.

Its operations in the chemicals sector include methanol production in Indonesia, barite mining in Mexico and industrial salt trading in various markets worldwide. In November 2010, it signed an agreement with the Australian rare earths mining company Lynas to import $350 million worth of rare earth minerals from Lynas' mine in Mount Weld, Australia.

Its consumer business operations include trading in grains, feed, sugar, coffee, fish, wood and paper. It owns the Japanese rights to several consumer brands such as Eastpak and McGregor.

=== Australian investments ===
Sojitz Blue Pty Ltd is an Australian subsidiary of Sojitz Corporation, established in 2002. Sojitz Blue acquired mining interest in the Queensland mining region at Minerva coal mine in 2005 (which was closed in 2021), and subsequently acquired Meteor Downs South and Gregory Crinum in 2019.

In October 2025, Sojitz signed up to a rare earths deal struck between the United States and Australia, which includes the expansion of an Alcoa facility in Wagerup, Western Australia, to include a processing facility for gallium known as the Gallium Recovery Project. Sojitz will be funding half of the project.

== ADV Films acquisition ==
In June 2006, Sojitz acquired a 20% stake in American anime distributor ADV Films. This was done as a means of acquiring more titles in the Japanese market. From this point on, virtually all titles that ADV acquired were under Sojitz's ownership. However, in January 2008, ADV mysteriously removed a large number of titles from their website. All the titles removed were titles acquired since the Sojitz acquisition including Gurren Lagann, which had test disks sent out with dubbed episodes. As of May 2008, Gurren Lagann was licensed by Bandai Entertainment. ADV Films made booth appearances at the Anime Central 2008 convention, but they canceled their planned panel. In July 2008, Funimation announced the acquisition of thirty of these titles.

The titles removed from ADV's website are as follows: 009-1, 5 Centimeters per Second, Ah! My Goddess: Flights of Fancy, both the film and television adaptions of the Key visual novel Air, Best Student Council, Blade of the Phantom Master, Comic Party Revolution, Coyote Ragtime Show, Devil May Cry, the 2006 live-action horror film Ghost Train, Guyver: The Bioboosted Armor, Innocent Venus, Jing King of Bandits: 7th Heaven, Jinki: Extend, the 2006 anime remake of yet another Key visual novel, Kanon, Kurau: Phantom Memory, Le Chevalier D'Eon, Magikano, Moeyo Ken, Moonlight Mile, Nerima Daikon Brothers, Pani Poni Dash!, Project Blue Earth SOS, Pumpkin Scissors, Red Garden, Tokyo Majin, UFO Princess Valkyrie, the first anime of Utawarerumono, Venus vs. Virus, The Wallflower, Welcome to the NHK, and Xenosaga.
