= Douglas–Grumman scandal =

The Douglas–Grumman scandal was a bribery scandal that rocked Japan in February 1979, concerning the sale of American fighter jets.

== History ==
1968
Japan's Ministry of Defense was considering various candidates for the Air SDF's new fighter jet, including the Lockheed CL1010-2, McDonnell-Douglas F-4, Saab 37 Viggen and Dassault Mirage F1. However, in practice the CL-1010-2 was still under development, and the probability of using European jets was low due to the US-Japan security treaty, so there were few real contenders other than the F-4.

1969
It was decided to use the F-4EJ, based on the F-4E (normally it would have been called the F-4J, in keeping with the F-104J and F-15J that had also been modified for Japan, but there was already an F-4J in the US Navy). The differences from the F-4E, due to pressure from the Japan Socialist Party, were the removal of key apparatus such as the nuclear bomb pre-flight controller (DCU-9/A), weapons release computer (ASQ-91), Bullpup air-to-ground missile controller (ARW-77) and aerial refuelling equipment.

1972
At the US-Japan meetings in Hawaii, President Richard Nixon persuaded Prime Minister Kakuei Tanaka to buy the P-3C and E-2C.

1978
25 December – The U.S. Securities and Exchange Commission (SEC) accuses McDonnell-Douglas of paying Japanese government officials US$15,000 in 1975 as bribes to buy their aircraft.

1979
4 January – The SEC accuses Grumman of paying various Japanese government officials (Nobusuke Kishi, Takeo Fukuda, Yasuhiro Nakasone, Raizō Matsuno and others) bribes via Nisshō Iwai (now Sojitz) to buy their E-2C aircraft. Tokyo District Court also commences an investigation, requesting information from the SEC.
30 January – The House of Representatives Lockheed Investigation Special Committee is renamed the "Special Committee to Investigate Aircraft Imports", with a remit to investigate all allegations concerning aircraft sales.
1 February – Mitsutaka Shimada, the Nisshō Iwai executive in charge of the aircraft department, dies by falling from its head office building in Akasaka, Tokyo, leaving various suicide notes. A documentary at the time questions whether it was really suicide, on the basis it would be impossible to climb a high window after stabbing one's heart, and a book by journalist Kōichirō Yoshihara also alleges, with medical evidence, that it was in fact murder. The main 'suicide' note included the words "The company's life is eternal... we should serve it for eternity." The death of a key person causes the investigation to stall.
14 February – The House of Representatives Budget Committee questions Nissho Iwai's Vice President Hachirō Kaifu (no relation to the later Prime Minister Toshiki Kaifu), President Mitsuo Ueda, and former aircraft division manager Kunio Arimori, live on TV. Kaifu appeared unable to sign his statement as his hand was trembling too much, which he later claimed was due to Parkinson's disease. Kaifu repeatedly said "I cannot remember", rejecting the bribery allegations, but confirmed that he had talks with former Prime Minister Kakuei Tanaka at around the time of the 1972 US-Japan Hawaii meetings, and Matsuno at around the time of the change to Grumman's agent (Itōchū Corporation, known at the time as C. Itoh & Co.). He refused to confirm he had hand-written the "Kaifu memo" which was one focus of the questions. Kaifu was also questioned about his relationship with LDP parliamentarian Rokusuke Tanaka, and claimed in the National Assembly that he had had no contact.
14 March – Nisshō Iwai's Air Department manager and deputy manager are arrested on suspicion of Foreign Exchange Act violations. These individuals had had no interactions with politicians, but are later found guilty of 'falsification and exercise of a private document'. The deputy manager claims that he was not involved, and was targeted by the prosecutors due to being Shimada's top manager in charge of military aircraft, while the counterfeit document had in fact been substantially created by his predecessor and the accounts department manager.
19 March – Kaifu is questioned by the House of Councillors Budget Committee, and denies writing the "Kaifu memo". On 4 April he is accused of perjury on this point.
22 March – Nisshō Iwai's former Vice President Kenjirō Yamamura and Executive Director Kiyoshi Inoue give evidence contradicting Kaifu at the Budget Committee. Yamamura testifies with regard to Kaifu's testimony at the House of Representatives Budget Committee that he was "confused".
31 March – Due to the conflicting evidence from Kaifu and Yamamura, the House of Councilors Budget Committee summons Kaifu, former chairman Yoshio Tsuji, and Yasuhiro Gō, former economic adviser to McDonnell-Douglas. Kaifu amends key parts of his testimony on the 19th, but notably keeps his attitude that responsibility lay with the late Shimada.
2 April – Kaifu is arrested on suspicion of Foreign Exchange Act violations. When the House of Councilors budget committee hear of his arrest that day, Ministry of Justice Criminal Bureau Head (later Attorney General) Shigeki Itō comments that The purpose of the investigation is not only to find small evils but also not to overlook greater evils. If the crime is at the top, we must understand and identify it thoroughly. suggesting that the scandal might spread to the centre of the political world. Itō's words Do not overlook greater evils and (later, in his response to a special committee meeting of the upper house on 25 May) 500 million yen for starters become buzzwords of the year.
16 April – The Attorney General, in overall charge of the investigation, changes from Hisao Kamiya (retiring due to age) to Tatsusaburō Tsuji. In his final press conference, Kamiya says The prosecutors still have plenty of ability to investigate – I am leaving midway, but am happy to sense their strength of intention.
24 April – Kaifu is rearrested on suspicion of perjury in the House of Representatives.
26 April – The Diet opposition parties collectively demand that Kishi, Matsuno and others be questioned about their involvement. The LDP refuses, and the National Assembly is left in limbo.
9 May – Itō suggests at the Legal Committee of the House of Representatives that the names "Fukuda" and "Matsuno" in the memo are unrelated to LDP representatives of the same names.
15 May – A 'Prosecutors' Summit Meeting' confirms that "Pursuit of politicians' criminal liability will be abandoned because of the statute of limitations and restrictions on our authority", thus ending the Douglas–Grumman scandal investigation. Only three Nisshō Iwai officials were ever charged.
24 May – Matsuno is questioned by the House of Representatives Special Committee on Aircraft Import Investigations. Matsuno acknowledges that he received 500 million yen, but argued that the 500 million yen was a political donation from Nisshō Iwai, rejecting the prosecution and opposition parties' claim that it was funds linked to the F-4E purchase. He also escapes prosecution thanks to the statute of limitations. On 25 July, Matsuno resigns from the House of Representatives and the LDP, and runs unsuccessfully for the House of Representatives as an independent on 7 October in the 35th General Election, but runs again for the 36th General Election 22 June 1980, succeeds and rejoins the LDP.
28 May – Matsuno is summoned as a witness by the upper house special committee on aircraft imports. After that, the opposition parties tried to submit a resolution on Matsuno's perjury, but this was rejected by the LDP and the Diet is again left in limbo. When the House of Councilors closes, all the bills under deliberation are dismissed, incomplete.
11 July – Kaifu and Kazuo Hidaka, former aircraft department manager at Sumitomo Corporation, are questioned by the Special Committee on Aircraft Imports regarding the E-2C introduction. Being questioned after arrest and prosecution as with Kaifu in this case is quite rare. Kaifu states that Matsuno was paid 500 million yen as a reward for the F-4 purchase.

1980
24 July – Kaifu is sentenced to 2 years' imprisonment, deferred for 3 years, by Tokyo District Court. Neither plaintiffs nor defendants appeal, and the sentence is confirmed on 7 August.

== See also ==
- Lockheed bribery scandals
