= LeSportsac =

American handbag and accessories company

- Industry: Retail
- Founded: 1974
- Headquarters: New York, NY, United States
- Products: Handbags; Women's accessories; Men's accessories; Travel accessories
- Parent: Itochu
- Website: lesportsac.com

LeSportsac Inc. is an American handbag, luggage, and travel accessories company. It is owned currently by Itochu Corp.

== Company ==
LeSportsac, Inc. was founded in 1974 by Melvin and Sandra Schifter as a travel accessories retail company that introduced a brand of luggage. Until the sale of the company LeSportsac products were made in the United States. Melvin and Sandra Schifter informally retired from day-to-day operations around 1990 leaving Melvin's son Tim Schifter to manage the company. During Tim's management the brand was revitalized and began to collaborate with fresh and innovative designers and brands. During November 2005, Accessory Network Group (“ANG”) purchased LeSportsac Inc.

During March 2011, Itochu Corp purchased the remaining assets owned by ANG. Itochu Corp currently owns the worldwide rights to the LeSportsac name and products.

== Distribution ==
In 2001, LeSportsac opened its first US main store on Madison Avenue in Manhattan (closed in 2019). Presently, LeSportsac’s primary U.S. distribution is by means of the LeSportsac website.

Internationally, LeSportsac sells through exclusive distributors in Asia, South America, Europe, the Mid-Pacific and the Middle East. Its products are sold in more than 20 countries worldwide including Canada, Italy, Japan, Hong Kong, Korea, Taiwan, Malaysia, and Singapore.
