= Ryūzō Sejima =

Japanese businessman and officer (1911-2007)

- 瀬島 龍三
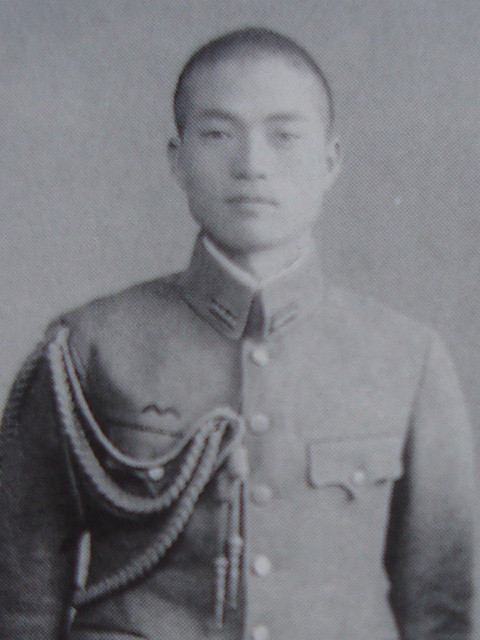
- Born: December 9, 1911; Toyama, Japan
- Died: September 4, 2007 (aged 95); Chofu, Japan
- Military career
- Allegiance: Empire of Japan
- Branch: Imperial Japanese Army (IJA)
- Service years: 1932–1945
- Rank: Lieutenant colonel
- Units: 4th Division (1939); Fifth Army (1939); Imperial General Headquarters (1939–45); Kwantung Army (1945)
- Conflicts: World War II; Pacific War
- Awards: Order of the Sacred Treasure, Grand Cordon
- Other work: C. Itoh & Co. (Chairman)

Ryūzō Sejima (瀬島 龍三, Sejima Ryūzō; December 9, 1911 – September 4, 2007) was a Japanese army officer and business leader.

== Early life and military career ==
Sejima was born in Toyama, Japan. His father, Ryūtarō Sejima (瀬島龍太郎), was an officer in the Imperial Japanese Army who served under General Maresuke Nogi during the Russo-Japanese War, and was later the mayor of the village of Matsuzawa in Nishitonami District, Toyama.

Sejima graduated from The Army War College (陸軍大学, Rikugun Daigaku) in 1938. During the Pacific War, he was as a staff officer at the Imperial Headquarters. He designed the Guadalcanal recovery strategy and the New Guinea strategy, and in July 1945 joined the Kwantung Army as a staff officer, where he negotiated Japan's cease-fire with Soviet General Aleksandr Vasilevsky.

He became a prisoner of war alongside General Otozō Yamada following Japan's surrender in 1945, and was detained for 11 years in Siberia. He was briefly flown from Vladivostok to Tokyo in 1946 to testify at the International Military Tribunal for the Far East. Most of Sejima's 11 years in Siberia were spent in a prison in Khabarovsk; years later, Sejima inscribed a memorial stone at the Peace Park in the city.

== Business and political career ==
Following his return from Siberia, Sejima joined C. Itoh & Co. (now Itochu Corporation) in 1958, where he was initially engaged in its aircraft trading business. He became a director in 1962, just four years after joining the company. Sejima led the corporate planning team at C. Itoh, where he implemented military-style reporting methods and formed a group of followers within the company known as the "Sejima machine." He took charge of Itoh's expansion into the oil industry and arranged an alliance between General Motors and Isuzu in 1971. He was also one of three key men involved in Itoh's entry to the People's Republic of China in 1972, making it one of the first Japanese companies to do business with the country. Sejima was also instrumental in Itoh's merger with Ataka & Co. He was promoted to deputy president in 1972, deputy chairman in 1977 and chairman in 1978; he left the chairmanship in 1981 but remained an executive advisor to the company until 2000.

During the 1980s, he served as a member of the Ad Hoc Commission on Administrative Reform and as an advisor to Prime Minister Yasuhiro Nakasone. In this capacity, he aided council chairman Toshio Doko in the privatization of NTT and the Japanese National Railways. Sejima went on to advise Prime Ministers Keizo Obuchi, Kiichi Miyazawa and Ryutaro Hashimoto. He was a director of NTT from 1986 to 1999. In 1998, he was appointed to head a panel examining reform of the Ministry of Finance. He was also chairman of the board of Asia University and the Chidorigafuchi National Cemetery.

Sejima also developed a close relationship with the military rulers of South Korea during the 1980s. Samsung founder Lee Byung-chul invited Sejima to Korea in 1980 in order to advise Chun Doo-hwan and Roh Tae-woo "as a fellow man of the military." Sejima acted as a go-between for Nakasone in arranging an historic meeting with Chun in 1983.

A committee led by Sejima erected a monument to Indian judge Radhabinod Pal at Tokyo's Yasukuni Shrine in 1997. Pal had been the dissenting judge in the guilty verdict handed down by the Tokyo War Crimes Tribunal.

== In media ==
=== Works by Sejima ===
- Sejima, Ryuzo (September 1995). 瀬島龍三 回想録―幾山河. Sankei Shimbun News Service. ISBN 978-4594018092.
- Sejima, Ryuzo (July 1996). 幾山河―瀬島龍三回想録. Sankei Shimbun News Service. ISBN 978-4594020415.
- Sejima, Ryuzo (February 1997). 祖国再生―わが日本への提案. PHP. ISBN 978-4569555348.
- Sejima, Ryuzo (July 2000). 大東亜戦争の実相. PHP. ISBN 978-4569574271.
- Sejima, Ryuzo (December 2009). 祖國再生. PHP. ISBN 978-4569673851.

=== Works related to Sejima ===
The novel Fumō Chitai, which has been adapted as a film and as two television series, is said to be based on the life of Sejima, although the author stated that she only borrowed the main character's progression (from the military to a prison camp to the postwar corporate world) from Sejima's life story.

Sejima's role in Japan-Korea relations during the 1980s was depicted in the Korean television series 5th Republic.
