= Factorenergia =

Spanish electricity and natural gas retailer

Factor Energía, S.A.
- Trade name: Factorenergia
- Type: Sociedad anónima (subsidiary)
- Industry: Energy
- Founded: 1999; 27 years ago
- Founder: Emili Rousaud
- Headquarters: Barcelona, Spain
- Area served: Spain, Portugal, Mexico, Chile, Brazil
- Key people: Emili Rousaud (CEO)
- Products: Electricity, natural gas, energy services
- Revenue: €655 million (2025)
- Net income: €35 million (2025)
- Parent: SmartestEnergy (85%)
- Website: factorenergia.com

Factor Energía, S.A., trading as Factorenergia, is a Spanish electricity and natural gas company headquartered in Barcelona. Founded in 1999 by Emili Rousaud, it was the first independent company to obtain administrative authorization to sell electricity after Spain liberalized its electricity market. The company mainly supplies small and medium-sized businesses and households, and has subsidiaries in Portugal, Mexico, Chile and Brazil. Since April 2026, 85% of the company has been owned by SmartestEnergy, a British subsidiary of the Japanese conglomerate Marubeni. In 2025 it reported revenue of €655 million and a net profit of €35 million.

== History ==
In July 2010, the investment fund JZ International acquired a majority stake in the company, which then had about 4,000 customers; over the following seven years its customer base grew to about 45,000 and its revenue from around €68 million to more than €370 million.

In November 2017, JZ sold its majority interest to a Canadian pension fund, in a transaction that valued the business at about €120 million, while retaining a minority stake.

In 2021, the company prepared an initial public offering, but postponed it that July because of market volatility.

In April 2026 SmartestEnergy acquired 85% of Factorenergia for €204 million, buying out the Ontario Pension Board and JZ International, which held 50% and 25% respectively. Rousaud kept a 15% stake, remained chief executive and joined SmartestEnergy's executive committee.

== Operations and expansion ==
In addition to electricity and gas supply, the company has moved into self-consumption, renewable generation and acquisitions. In 2021 it announced its first generation projects, a 6 MW solar plant and a 9 MW wind farm in Fuerteventura, and acquired the Castilian-Leonese retailer Enercoluz, which added about 7,000 customers. It opened subsidiaries in Mexico (2017), Portugal (2019), Bulgaria (2021) and Chile (2022), and in June 2026 entered Brazil through Factorenergia Brasil, a joint venture with Path Investimentos focused on small and medium-sized businesses. Its revenue reached a record €915 million in 2022, when energy prices were high.

== Regulatory issues ==
In February 2026 the National Commission on Markets and Competition (CNMC) imposed legally binding measures on Factor Energía to curb misleading sales practices. The regulator said that although the company held only about 1% of the electricity and gas markets, it accounted for 61% of complaints about deceptive commercial practices received between January 2023 and August 2025. The measures required stronger caller identification, prior consent for sales calls and regular reporting to the CNMC, without imposing a fine. The company said the regulator had found no grounds for a sanction and questioned how the complaint figures had been compared. The consumer organization OCU welcomed the measures but called for financial penalties.
