= Itochu =

Japanese general trading company

Itochu Corporation
- Native name: 伊藤忠商事株式会社
- Romanized name: Itōchū Shōji kabushiki gaisha
- Formerly: C. Itoh & Co., Ltd. (1918-1992)
- Type: Public
- Traded as: TYO: 8001; TOPIX Large 70 component
- Industry: General trading
- Founded: 1858; 168 years ago (predecessor business); 1949; 77 years ago (present corporation)
- Founder: Chubei Itoh
- Headquarters: 3 Chome-1-3 Umeda Kita-ku, Osaka, Japan; Akasaka Trust Tower, 17-22, Akasaka 2-chome, Minato-ku, Tokyo, Japan
- Key people: Masahiro Okafuji (chairman and CEO); Keita Ishii (president and COO)
- Revenue: ▲¥14.85 trillion (US$135.31 billion) (FY2026)
- Operating income: ▲¥892.4 billion (US$8.13 billion) (FY2026)
- Net income: ▲¥900.3 billion (US$8.2 billion) (FY2026)
- Total assets: ▲¥15.89 trillion (US$144.78 billion) (FY2026)
- Total equity: ▲¥6.58 trillion (US$59.95 billion) (FY2026)
- Owner: Berkshire Hathaway (7.4%)
- Number of employees: 115,089 (2026)
- Subsidiaries: Itochu Techno-Solutions; FamilyMart; Yanase; Dole; Edwin; Century 21 Real Estate of Japan Ltd.
- Website: www.itochu.co.jp

Itochu Corporation (伊藤忠商事株式会社; previously known as C. Itoh & Co. until 1992) is a Japanese corporation based in Umeda, Kita-ku, Osaka and Aoyama, Minato, Tokyo.

It is one of the largest Japanese sogo shosha (general trading and investment companies) distinguished by the strength of its textile business and its successful business operations in China. Itochu was ranked 72nd on the 2020 list of Fortune Global 500 companies, with an annual trading revenue of US$100 billion.

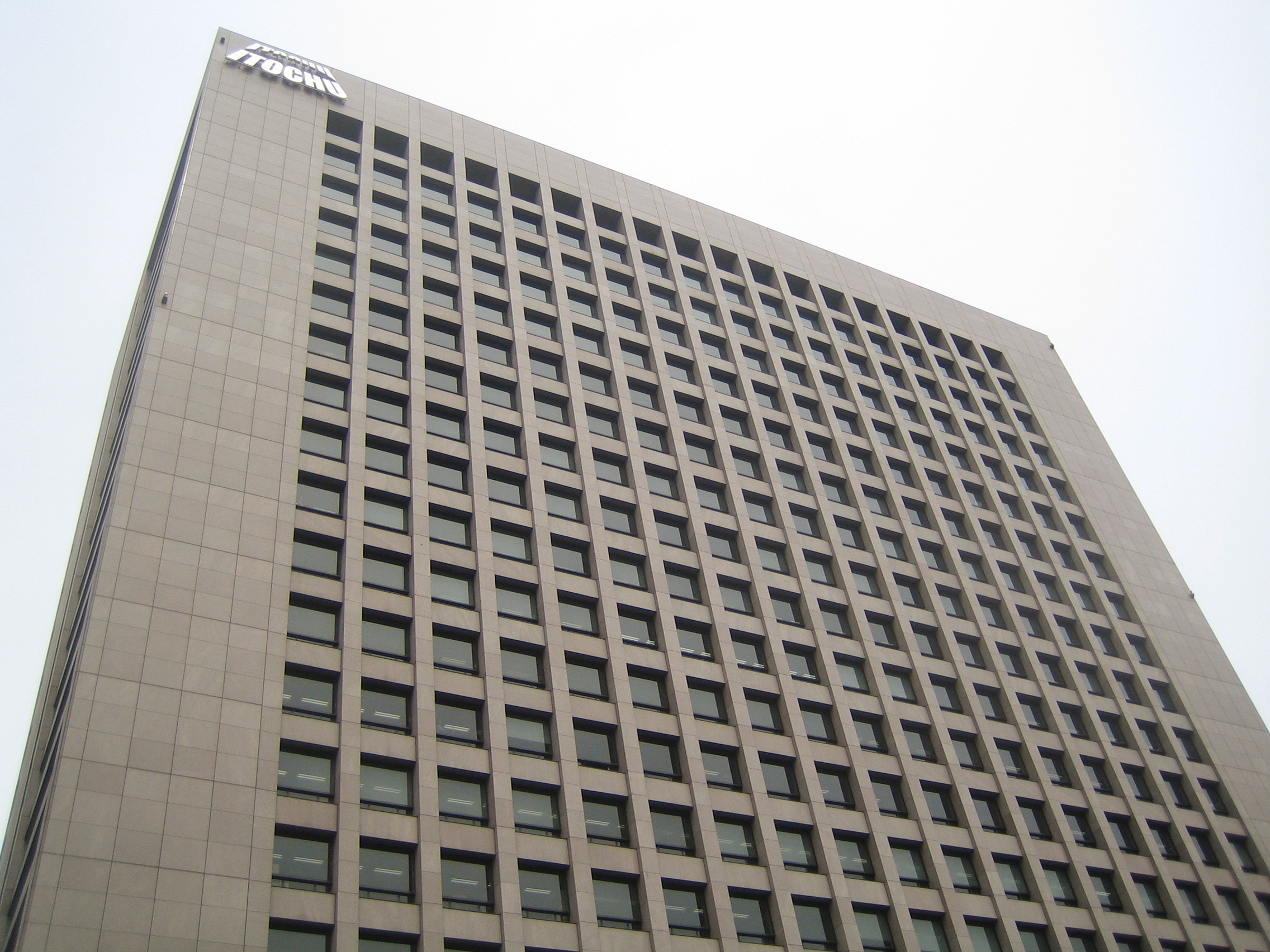
Tokyo headquarters of Itochu

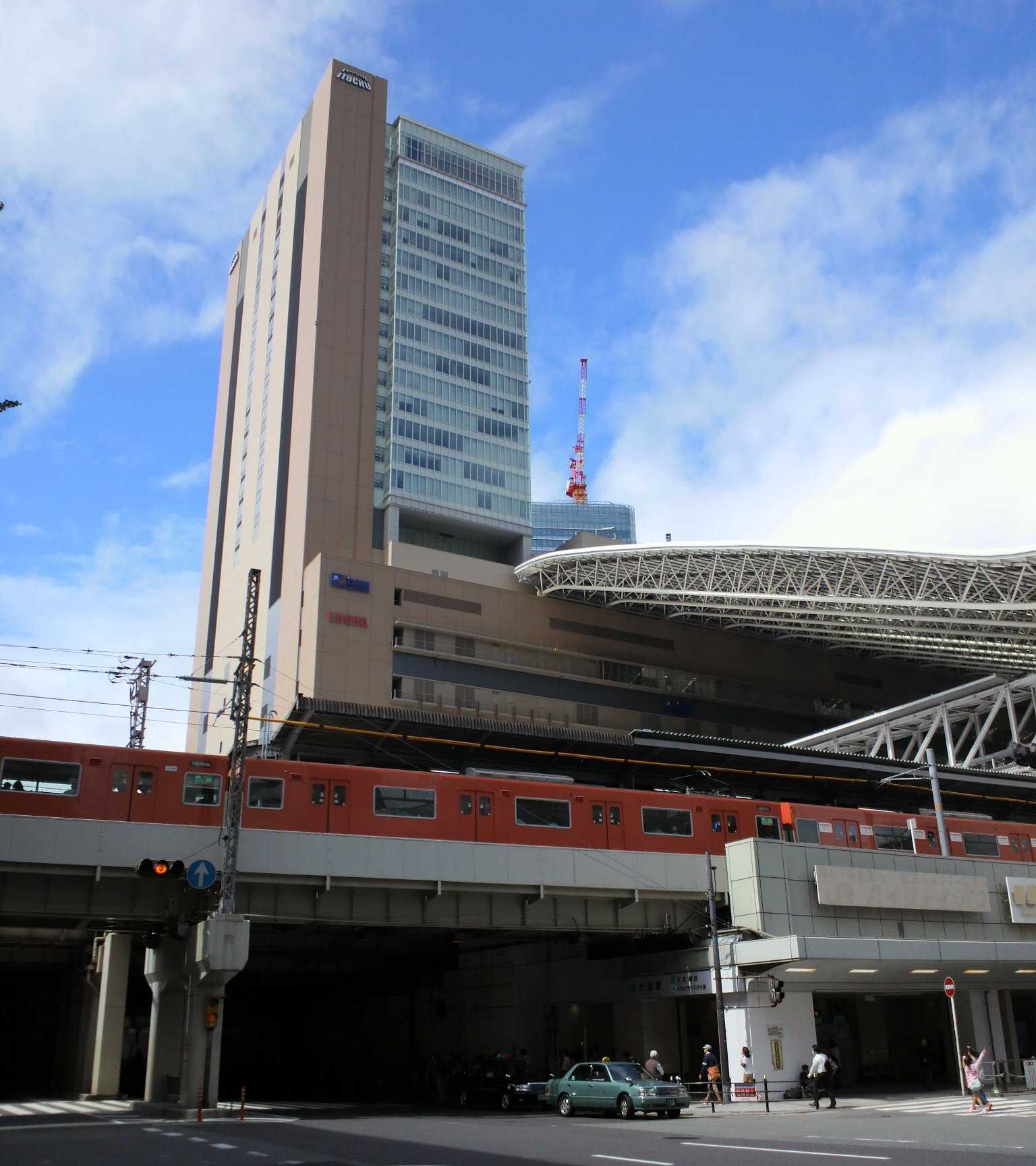
Osaka headquarters of Itochu (North Gate Building)

== Current business overview ==
Itochu's business has eight major operational divisions, "Division Company".

- Textile Company: Itochu trades in raw materials and finished apparel, and also has a brand business. It owns a portfolio of investments and rights in well-known fashion brands including Converse, Hunting World, LeSportsac, Mila Schön and Paul Smith. In 2018, Itochu acquired the Japanese Master License and exclusive distribution rights for the Laura Ashley brand.
- Machinery Company: Includes plant projects, marine, aerospace, automotive, construction/industrial machinery and healthcare. In the automotive sector, Itochu is a shareholder of Yanase, Isuzu, and Mazda. In the infrastructure sector, Itochu partnered with Toshiba and Hitachi to supply infrastructure for the first expressway in Vietnam, the North–South Expressway between Hanoi and Ho Chi Minh City. Itochu is also a partner in supplying rolling stock for the MTR in Hong Kong and for New Generation Rollingstock passenger rail in Queensland, Australia. It is a minority investor in the Sarulla geothermal power project in Indonesia and has partnered with Mitsubishi Heavy Industries and Engie to develop the $15.8 billion Sinop Nuclear Power Plant in Sinop, Turkey.
- Metals & Minerals Company: Engages in mining and ore trading, steel and non-ferrous metal trading, coal and nuclear fuel trading and solar power. Furthermore, the “Carbon Neutral Management Section” was established in April, 2021, directly under the Metal & Mineral Resources Division in order to promote the developments in areas such as Hydrogen & Ammonia and CCUS (Carbon dioxide Capture, Utilization and Storage). In addition, the Steel Business Coordination Department, which is directly overseen by the Metals & Minerals Company, provides support for Marubeni-Itochu Steel Inc. in the field of steel products.
- Energy & Chemicals Company: consists of 3 divisions: the Energy Division, the Chemicals Division and the Power & Environmental Solution Division. The Energy Division handles trading of general energy-related products, including crude oil, petroleum products, LPG, LNG, natural gas and hydrogen, as well as developing related projects. This Division also undertakes projects in oil & gas exploration, development and production. Trades in oil and gas and a wide range of chemical products such as methanol, PTA and fertilizers.
- Food Company: Handles production, processing and distribution of various foodstuffs. Two major group businesses are FamilyMart, acquired from Seiyu in 1998, and Dole Asia Holdings Pte. Ltd, which was formed after Dole Food Company sold its worldwide packaged foods and Asia fresh produce businesses to Itochu for $1.7 billion in cash. Itochu is also a strategic partner of COFCO in China and owns an export grain terminal in Longview, Washington. As of 2020 Itochu was one of the three largest global tuna traders along with Tri Marine of Italy and FCF of Taiwan.
- General Products & Realty Company: consists with the Forest Products, General Merchandise & Logistics Division and the Construction & Real Estate Division. The Forest Products, General Merchandise & Logistics Division deals with North American building materials, pulp, natural rubber, tires, and the distribution business including third-party logistics (3PL) and international transportation. The Construction & Real Estate Division deals with the construction materials business that handles wood products and OEM materials, the real estate development business that develops mainly residential housing and logistics facilities, and the real estate investment and building operation and management business. A recent major acquisition in this division is WECARS, a major Japanese car retailer. Formerly known as Big Motor, the company was purchased by Itochu for ¥60 billion ($391 million) after scandal forced the company to rebrand.
- ICT & Financial Business Company: consists with the ICT Division and the Financial & Insurance Business Division.
- The 8th Company: collaborates with the other seven Business Companies.

== Offices ==
Itochu's Osaka headquarters is located at the North Gate Building, 1–3, Umeda 3-Chome, Kita-ku, Osaka, Japan. Its Tokyo headquarters is located at 5-1 Kita-Aoyama 2-Chome, Minato, Tokyo, Japan.

Itochu also has seven branch offices in Japan, sixteen offices and local subsidiaries in China, 24 in Asia, eight in the CIS, four in Australia, fifteen in the Middle East, eight in Africa, twelve in Europe, ten in North America and nine in Latin America.

== History ==
=== Foundation period (1858–1903) ===
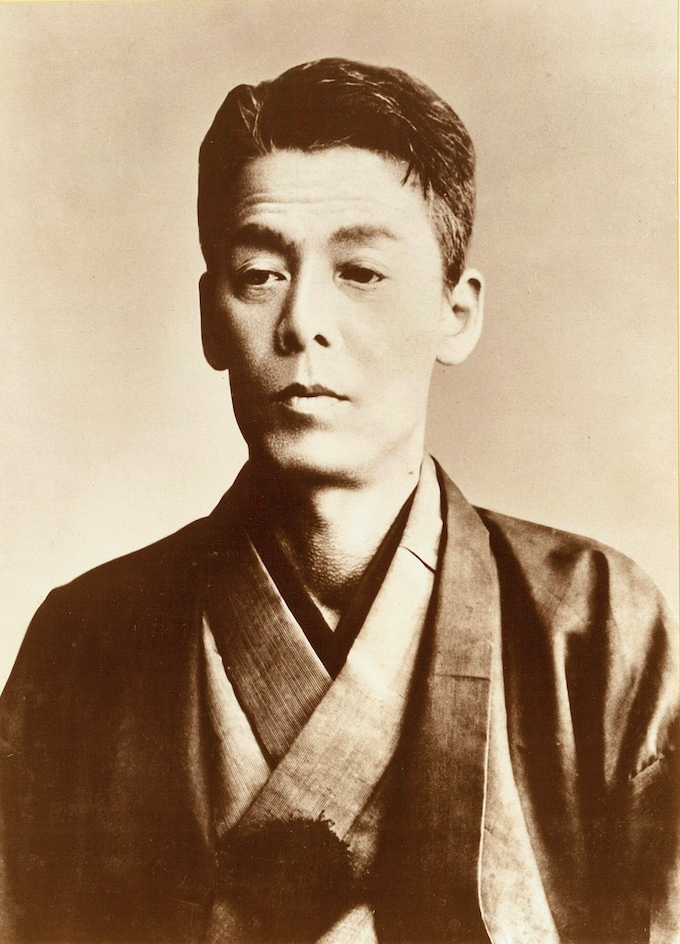
Founder Ito Chubei

Itochu started in 1858, shortly after the opening of Japan to foreign trade, when Chubei Itoh (伊藤 忠兵衛, Itō Chūbei) began door-to-door wholesaling of linen in the regions between Osaka and Kyushu. Itoh founded the "Benichu" drapery store in the Honmachi district of Osaka in 1872. This site was renamed "Itoh Honten" in 1884 and became the Itoh Thread and Yarn Store in 1893

In the following year, he traveled as far as Nagasaki via Okayama, Hiroshima, and Shimonoseki. At this time, Japan concluded the Treaty of Amity and Commerce with five countries, namely the United States, the United Kingdom, France, Russia, and the Netherlands, opening an era of free trade. The sight of foreigners, battleships, and foreign trading posts astonished Chubei and sparked his curiosity. He became convinced of the limitless potential of commerce.

Chubei opened Benchu, a drapery store at Honmachi 2-chome, Higashi-ku, Osaka, east of Nakahashisuji. Benchu mainly handled linen and fabrics from the Bino and Kanto regions. At that time, the Fushimi-machi area was the center of drapery wholesalers, while Honmachi was attracting many used clothing merchants. Despite this, in selecting the base of his business in Osaka, Chubei Itoh I chose Honmachi, anticipating the future development of the Honmachi area. He is said to have chosen Honmachi because it was accessible by road from Kawaguchi-cho, where boats could dock, and the cost of land was less than a half that in Fushimi-machi. Once Benchu was open, Chubei drew up a charter. In it, he set out his workers' rights and duties, unique for the time, to ensure that all workers, including junior staff, could work to their utmost capabilities.

Chubei opened Itoh Itomise, a cotton thread wholesale store, at Azuchi-cho 2-chome, Higashi-ku, Osaka. Under Chubei Itoh I, the general manager, the store started with ten workers, including an assistant general manager, manager, and assistant manager. Itoh Itomise adopted a series of management systems that were revolutionary for the times, including the codifying of the sharing of profits by three stakeholders, the introduction of Western-style bookkeeping, and the issuance of Jitsugyo, a monthly business magazine (which became a leading magazine for the fabric industry; with some copies sold to the public).

=== Interwar period (1903–1945) ===
Chubei Itoh II took over the company following his father's death in 1903. The Russo-Japanese War, which began that year, ended with Japan's victory. When Chubei II was in charge of Itochu's management, the business of the Ito head office was booming due to the victorious boom brought about by the Russo-Japanese War.

When Chubei II took his first steps at the company in the Logistics Department, which was in charge of packing, shipping, and transporting products, he refined himself as a young manager and embarked on reforming the management of the Ito Head Office. In 1908, he integrated the scattered businesses of the Ito family, organized 'Ito Chubei Headquarters', and served as its representative. This was an epoch-making organizational reform since Chubei I founded Benichu in Osaka 36 years ago. The headquarters decided management policies for each of the four stores and one factory, and supervised personnel and fund management.

In July 1908, he opened the first Tokyo branch of a Kansai yarn dealer in Ningyocho, Nihonbashi.

The company opened an office in Shanghai in the 1890s and started business in Seoul in 1905, but had severe difficulties with these first overseas forays. He turned his attention to overseas markets from an early stage, making the export department of the Ito head office independent as the Ito export store, and opening branch offices one after another in Shanghai, South Korea, the Philippines, and Manila. Chubei II was infused with the business aspirations and enterprising spirit of Chubei I. He travelled to London in 1910 and began direct procurement and financing for the business in the London markets, which considerably improved its margins, as it had previously used more expensive intermediaries in Japan.

In 1913, he established a cotton yarn department, but in July 1914, World War I began, and he experienced a sharp drop in the market prices of raw silk and cotton yarn. Uncertainty about the course of the war caused the Japanese economy to temporarily fall into turmoil, with the stock market, raw silk and cotton yarn trading prices crashing, and bank runs on bank runs.

In 1918, "C. Itoh & Co." is transformed into a public stock company "C. Itoh & Co., Ltd." The New York branch office is opened.

Itoh's company grew considerably in the wake of World War I, with offices in the United States, India, the Philippines and China, and the firm began to handle machinery, automobiles and metals in addition to its core business of textiles. However, a recession in 1920 left the company deeply in debt, and unlike the major zaibatsu firms of the time, it had no captive bank to finance its business. In 1921, the company split in half, with one half forming what is now known as Marubeni. The company's performance improved in the 1930s, but as World War II began in the latter half of the 1930s, all trading companies' business became increasingly war-oriented.

In 1941, Sanko Kabushiki Kaisha, Ltd. is established by merging of C. Itoh & Co., Marubeni Shoten Ltd., and Kishimoto Shoten Ltd. In 1944, Sanko is merged with Daido Boeki Kaisha, Ltd. and Kureha Cotton Spinning Co., Ltd. to form Daiken Co., Ltd.

=== Post-war period (1945–1960) ===
In August 1945, Japan accepted the Potsdam Declaration, and the World War II ended with Japan's unconditional surrender and defeat. In the chaos after the war, the company's employees working overseas and their families returned to their home country of Japan for about two years from September 1945 to September 1947, whose number reached 1077. The Allied Forces, which occupied Japan at the end of the war, followed the policy of destroying Japan's military power and establishing a democratic political and economic system.

In 1946, Daiken Co., Ltd. was designated as a restricted company along with 46 subsidiaries, and was placed under the strict supervision of the Holding Company Liquidation Committee. In 1947, in accordance with the Law for Elimination of Excessive Concentration of Economic Power, Daiken Co., Ltd. decided on a corporate restructuring plan centered on the separation of the manufacturing and trading divisions. It was decided to split into four new companies: ITOCHU Corporation, Marubeni Corporation, Kureha Cotton Spinning, and Amagasaki Nail Works, Ltd.

The constituent companies of Daiken were spun off from each other in December 1949 as part of GHQ efforts to dismantle the war-era zaibatsu. Itoh re-listed on the Tokyo Stock Exchange in 1950. On December 1, 1949, the company was incorporated. Daiken Co., Ltd., a company created from the merger of trading and manufacturing firms during World War II, separates into C. Itoh & Co., Ltd., Kureha Cotton Spinning Co., Ltd., Marubeni Co., Ltd., and Amagasaki Nail Works, Ltd.

The inflation that had continued since the end of the war was brought under control by the Dodge Line, and from around 1949, Japan accelerated its progress toward a liberal economic system. Itoh resumed business in the wake of the war by bartering Japanese textiles for foreign grain, and resumed trading in petroleum, aircraft, automobiles and machinery to meet UN forces requirements during the Korean War. It was Uichiro Kosuge, president of the company, who led the post-war relaunch of Itochu. The new Itochu established its head office at 2-36 Honmachi, Higashi-ku, Osaka, and began domestic sales and import/export operations in the three fields of textiles, machinery, and general goods.

Since 1950, The Korean War gave further impetus to the Japanese economy, and ITOCHU greatly improved its performance in import and export transactions. In the mid-1950s, ITOCHU's transformation into a general trading company progressed rapidly, and against the background of exchange trade and the liberalization of exchange rates of Japanese Yen. The company's sales composition, which had a high proportion of textiles, expanded significantly from this time on non-textiles, and the transaction volume accounted for 13% of total sales (fiscal year ended March 1951).

Starting out as a textile trading company, it expanded its business in non-textile fields such as aircraft, automobiles, petroleum, and machinery, and accelerated its progress towards generalization. In March 1950, the company concluded a general sales agency agreement with Roots, a British automobile manufacturer, and it established an aircraft section to respond to the resumption of civil aviation. and moved to acquire import agency rights for foreign aircraft manufacturers in 1952. As for oil, the company took dynamic measures one after another, such as becoming an agent for Standard Oil, a major US oil company, and participating in the management of Nichibei Oil.

There was also a quick response to internationalization. In 1951, the New York office was established, and a local subsidiary, Itochu America Inc. was established in 1952to prepare for the expansion of trade with the United States. Subsequently, the company name was raised high in various parts of the world, such as London, Mexico in 1953, Hamburg in 1954, Hong Kong, and Bangkok in 1955.

After the war, Itoh absorbed many smaller trading operations that could no longer stand on their own. Itoh expanded its overseas mining and petroleum exploration activity in the late 1960s and early 1970s.

In 1957, The Company completes construction of a new Tokyo Branch Office building (at 2-chome, Nihonbashi Honcho, Chuo-ku, Tokyo), and, later in 1967, The Company renames the Tokyo Branch Office the Tokyo Head Office, to join the Osaka Head Office in a dual head-office structure.

=== Japan's economic growth period (1960–1980) ===
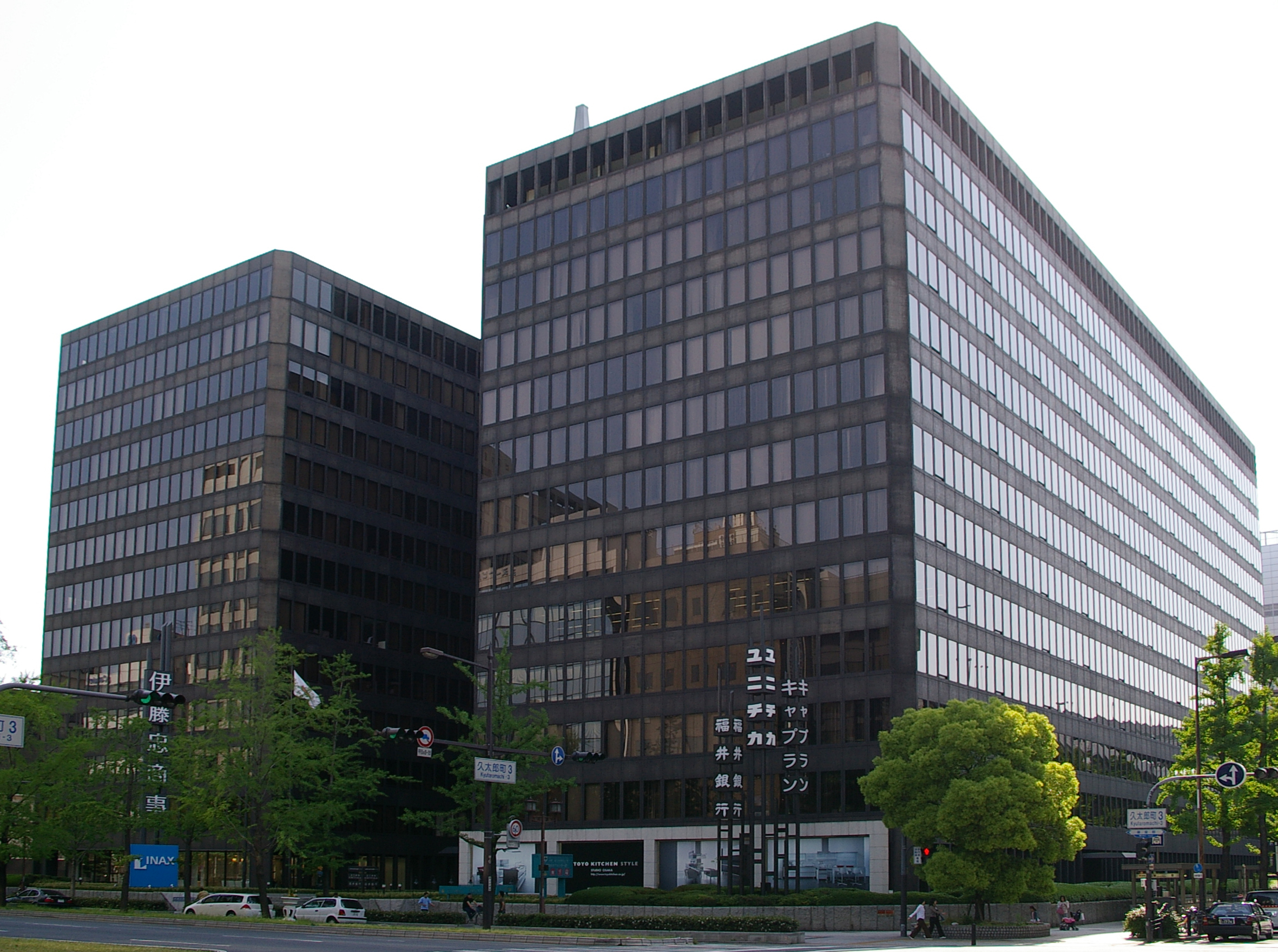
Former Osaka headquarters of Itochu (left building) in Chuo-ku, Osaka, Japan

After gaining support from the United States and achieving domestic economic reform, Japan's economy was able to soar from the 1950s to the 1970s. After the first oil-price shock struck Japan (1973 oil crisis), the country's economy entered a steadily increasing stage until 1990. (Refer to Japanese economic miracle) The company also entered a growth period in the 1970s.

The company's long-held vision of “Enhancing non-textile businesses - Diversification” was finally realized, and it rapidly expanded operations as a general trading company. In 1972 Itoh became the first Japanese trading company allowed to do business in the People's Republic of China. It publicly announced that it would comply with the “Four Japan-China trading conditions” on December 14, 1971, and then established a section within the company dedicated to China and began initiatives to actively promote trade. When a mission led by then President Mr. Echigo visited China in March 1972, ITOCHU was officially recognized as a friendly trading company by the Chinese government, and continued to play significant roles in promoting friendship and trade between Japan and China. Soon after this appointment, on September 29, 1972, Japanese Prime Minister Kakuei Tanaka achieved a normalization of diplomatic relations between Japan and China.

In the 1970s, the company became part of the "Kawasaki Group" within the keiretsu of Dai-Ichi Kangyo Bank (now Mizuho Corporate Bank), eventually displacing Nissho Iwai as the keiretsu's dominant trading company. Itoh's affiliation with the keiretsu was significantly looser than other keiretsu-affiliated trading companies, and many firms within the DKB group did not use Itoh's services at all.

Former Imperial Japanese Army staff officer Ryuzo Sejima joined Itoh in 1958 after spending 11 years in a Siberian prison. Four years later, he was promoted to director and became Itoh's head of corporate planning, implementing a military-style internal reporting system. He went on to serve as president and chairman of the company, having developed a powerful group of followers known as the "Sejima Machine."

In 1970, Sejima and his younger protege Minoru Murofushi arranged a joint venture between General Motors and Isuzu, one of the first tie-ups between US and Japanese automakers. In 1971, the company successfully assisted in arranging a basic contract for cooperation between General Motors of the United States and Isuzu of Japan. The first investment of GM taking a 34% stake in Isuzu was seen in 1972, when the Chevrolet LUV became the first Isuzu-built vehicle to be sold in the United States. While the company had a long relationship with GM going back to the 1920s, Isuzu introduced the Gemini in 1974 which was co-produced with General Motors as the T-body Chevrolet Chevette. A modified version was sold in the United States as Buick's Opel by Isuzu, and in Australia as the Holden Gemini. As a result of the collaboration, certain American GM products were sold to Japanese customers through Isuzu dealerships. The company assisted Isuzu to export also increased considerably as a result of being able to use GM networks, from 0.7% of production in 1973 to 35.2% by 1976; this while overall production increased more than fourfold in the same period.

Itoh absorbed Ataka & Co., the ninth largest general trading company in Japan, in 1977. Ataka had recently suffered major losses from an oil development project in the United States and had undergone restructuring at the direction of its main lender, Sumitomo Bank.

From the early 1970s Itoh was a major supplier of synthetic yarn (polyester) to India's Reliance Industries Limited. Over the years, the close collaboration between both companies culminated in the co-promotion of a world-scale Polypropylene Project with a capacity of 250,000 tonnes per annum at a total project cost of Rs. 525 Crores, at Hazira in the State of Gujarat. With a $50 million cost for a 15 percent stake, it was at that point, the largest investment in India by a Japanese firm. Itoh also marketed products—under their own label—as diverse as a line of bicycles (mostly manufactured by Bridgestone), and computer printers. Itochu began to develop a strong information technology business in the 1980s through its subsidiary C. Itoh Techno-Science (CTC), which acted as a Japan distributor for Sun Microsystems, Cisco, Oracle and others.

=== Economic recession period (1990–2000) ===
After the economic miracle and consequent asset price bubble the country experienced a recession period the lost decade. Trying to deflate speculation and keep inflation in check, the Bank of Japan sharply raised inter-bank lending rates in late 1989. This sharp policy caused the bursting of the bubble, and the Japanese stock market crashed. In the two decades starting from such period, the company experienced the challenges and restructured its portfolio.

On October 1, 1992, C. Itoh & Co. Ltd. changed its English name to Itochu Corporation, a more direct transliteration of its Japanese name. By the early 1990s Itochu had become the largest trading company in Japan, but losses from the Japanese asset price bubble, particularly domestic real estate investments, brought it down to third place by the middle of the decade. In the 1990s, Itochu made several investments in the media industry, including a minority stake in Time Warner and investments in cable and satellite delivery systems.

In 1997, the company introduced "Division Company" system, which is to till today. With ITOCHU's operations in Japan and overseas becoming more diversified and the management environment changing very quickly, the Company recognized that it needed to adopt a more autonomous management approach, enabling greater agility by delegating authority and responsibility to its divisions. The concept of developing a “Division Company” system was created. Consequently, an examination committee was set up in 1995 and the system was adopted in FY1997. The main purposes of the system were, first, to create an optimal management system with independent management by the Division Companies (to create a system geared to the characteristics of the Companies, enable prompt decision making through a bold decentralization of authority, and build a more sophisticated management system based on consolidated performance and balance sheets); second, to establish a small and efficient head office; and third, to achieve the minimum control required in line with the decentralization of authority. By adopting this new approach, ITOCHU sought to strengthen its performance and operations, while bolstering its earnings. ITOCHU becomes the first sogo shosha to receive environmental certificate ISO14001.

Uichirō Niwa became president of Itochu in 1998, implementing cuts to unprofitable businesses and cutting back executive perks enjoyed by his predecessor Murofushi. In 1999, Itochu became one of the first Japanese companies to move away from the traditional seniority-based pay scale, adopting a base pay scale based on responsibilities, impact and value of each position as well as a performance-linked bonus system. Itochu also spun off CTC in 1999, only to see CTC quickly achieve a market capitalization more than twice that of its former parent company.

In 2001, ITOCHU Corporation and Marubeni Corporation spin off and merge their respective steel divisions, launching Marubeni-Itochu Steel Inc. (MISI). At the period, both ITOCHU and Marubeni have been experiencing excessive competition in the domestic market of steel and metal products and the two entities who share the same history routes filed the dialogues towards merging the similar operations into MISI.

=== Period under current management (2010–present) ===
Masahiro Okafuji became president of Itochu in 2010 and announced a strategy to make Itochu the first-ranked sogo shosha in areas other than raw resources, particularly in food products and machinery. Under Okafuji's leadership, Itochu has led its way to be one of the most profitable sogo shosha. He remained as the president till he was appointed as Chairman-CEO in 2018.

On 11 March 2011, Itochu was criticized for holding a champagne soirée at LeSportsac's Omotesando flagship during Japan's so-called "3.11" chain of calamities that caused tens of thousands of deaths and $235 billion (World Bank) in damage.

In 2011, Itochu moved its Osaka headquarters to the North Gate Building adjacent to Osaka Station.

In 2013, Itochu implemented a general ban on work after 8 PM with an across-the-board "lights out" policy at 10 PM while encouraging that any necessary overtime be taken in the early morning hours, reducing the total amount of overtime across the company.

In 2014, Itochu entered into a cross-shareholding partnership with the Thai conglomerate Charoen Pokphand (CP), and together with CP, agreed to invest over $8 billion in the Chinese state-owned conglomerate CITIC Limited during 2015, the largest investment ever made by a Japanese general trading company. The transaction was also the largest acquisition in China by a Japanese company, and the largest investment by foreigners in a Chinese state-owned enterprise.

In March 2016, Itochu recorded JPY 352.2 bil in PAT in the fiscal year which ranked itself as the most profitable sogo shosha for its first time. The natural resources commodity price was decreased during the fiscal year ended in March 2016, which made its competitors Mitsubishi Corporation and Mitsui & Co Ltd fell in profits. In July 2016, an American short seller Glaucus Research Group published a report critical of Itochu's accounting practices, causing a stock price dip of around 10%.

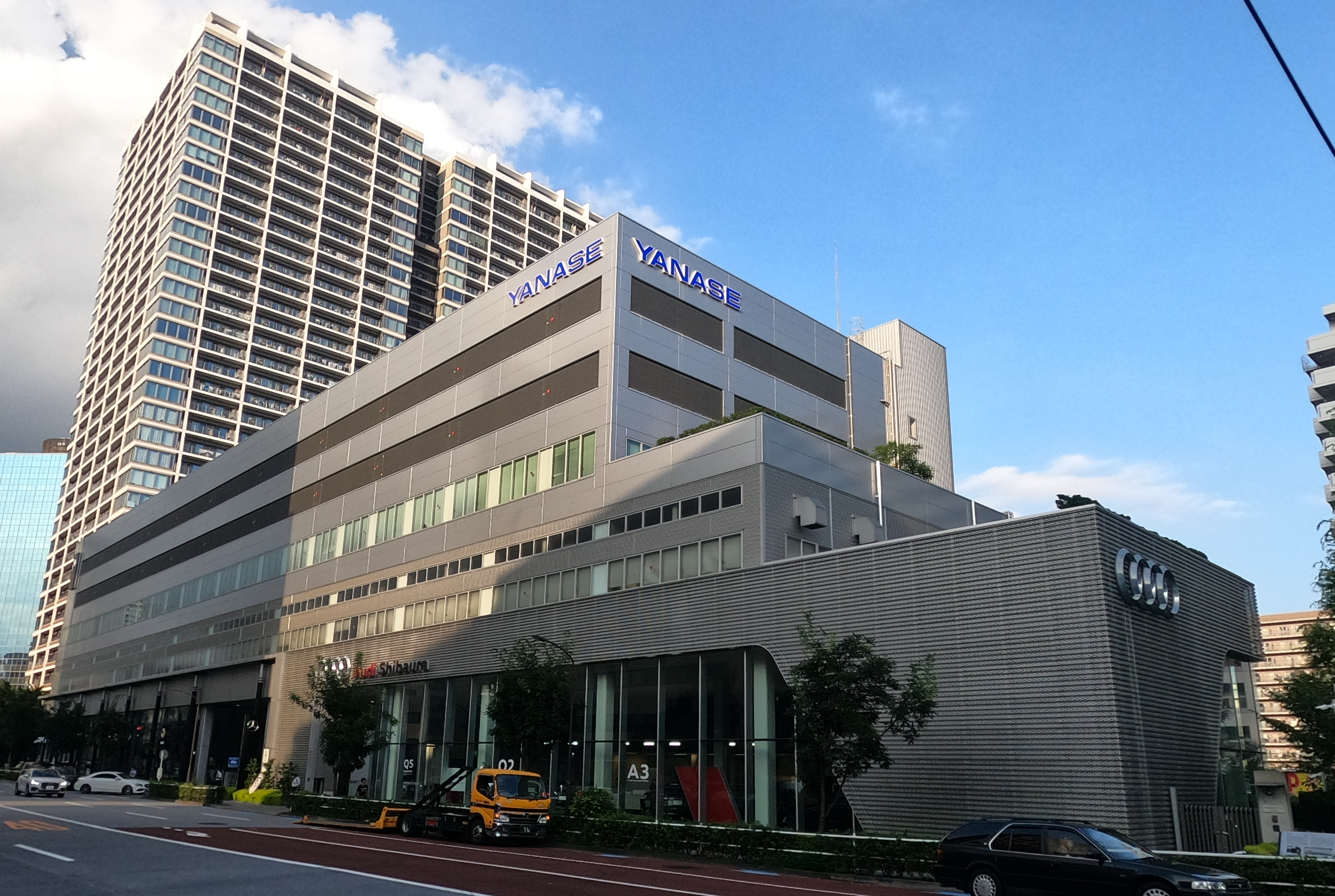
HQ of Yanase, the largest retailer and importer of European and North American vehicles to Japan (Shibaura, Minato, Tokyo)

In May 2017, Itochu acquired 10.1% share of Yanase which is an importer distributor of automobiles such as Mercedes-Benz, through TOB, which made Itochu to be 50.1% shareholder. Itochu participated in its equity earlier in 2003, and acquired further share to be a 66% shareholder in 2018.

In August 2018, Itochu acquired 8.6% share of FamilyMart which is Japan's second largest convenience store chain behind 7-Eleven, through TOB, which made Itochu the 50.1% shareholder. Itochu participated in its equity earlier in 1998, and, after merging other competitors including CircleK, acquired further share to be a 95% shareholder in 2021.

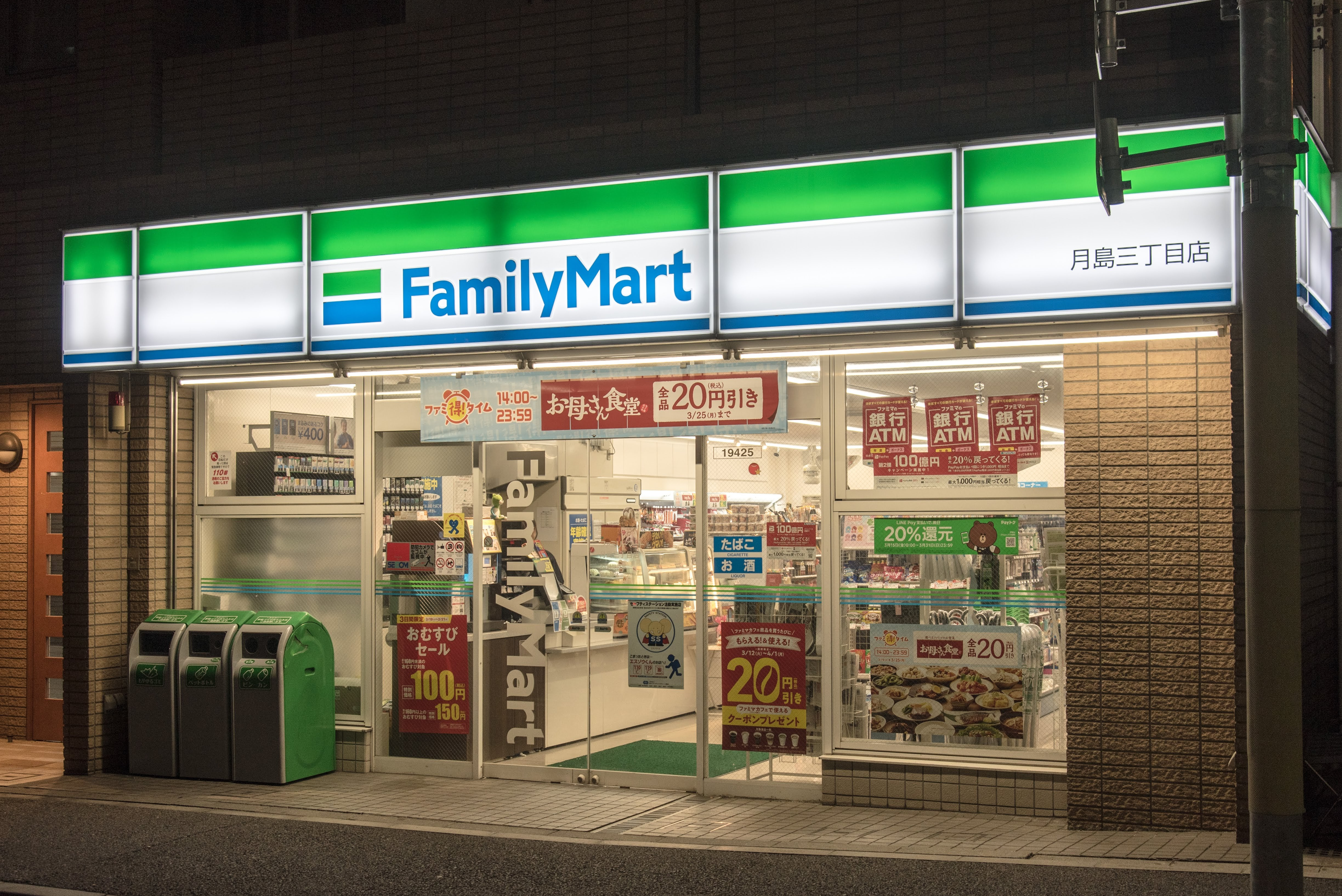
FamilyMart store

In 2019 and 2020, Itochu was ranked the most popular employer for newly minted Japanese university graduates. Itochu has remained one of the most popular employers for graduates of top Japanese universities since the 1990s due to their high compensation levels, employment stability and the diversity of opportunities available to prospective employees.

In September 2020, Warren Buffett's Berkshire Hathaway announced that it had acquired over 5% of the stock in the company, along with four other Japanese trading houses, over the 12-month period ending in August 2020. By April 2023, Berkshire increased the stake to 7.4%.

In March 2021, Itochu ended its fiscal year by becoming the most profitable (recording JPY 401.4 bil in PAT) and the most valued (recording JPY 5,685 bil in market capitalization) sogo shosha in Japan.

On 5 February 2024, Itochu Chief Financial Officer Tsuyoshi Hachimura, announced that the company was to end its partnership with the Israeli military technology company Elbit after the International Court of Justice ordered Israel the prior month to prevent alleged acts of genocide against Palestinians and to do more to help the region's civilians. It also purchased Big Motor following a series of scandals, finalising the transaction on 1 May.

== Notable people ==
- Mac Akasaka, rare earths trader, perennial candidate in Japanese elections
- Ichirō Fujisaki, former Japanese ambassador to the United States, currently member of the Board of Directors of Itochu
- Hiroyuki Nagahama, member of the House of Representatives and Environment Minister in 2012, worked for Itochu early in his professional career
- Uichirō Niwa, president from 1998 to 2004, later Japanese ambassador to China
- Ryūzō Sejima, chairman from 1978 to 1981, Kwantung Army staff officer during World War II
- Toshiyuki Takano, retired diplomat, currently executive advisor to Itochu
- Tsuneharu Takeda, former Imperial prince and later ambassador to Bulgaria, worked at Itochu from 1967 to 2005 and served as head of its subsidiaries in Australia and New Zealand.
- Teruhide Kikuchi, former official distributor of Nintendo in Mexico during the 1980s and early 1990s.
