= Richard Miller (agent) =

American FBI agent and convicted spy (1936-2013)

- Born: Richard William Miller; 1936; Wilmington, California, U.S.
- Died: October 16, 2013 (aged 76–77); Utah, U.S.
- Education: Brigham Young University
- Occupations: Agent, Federal Bureau of Investigation
- Years active: 1963–1984
- Known for: First FBI agent indicted and convicted of espionage

Richard William Miller (1936 – October 16, 2013) was an American FBI agent who was the first FBI agent indicted for and convicted of espionage. In 1991, he was sentenced to 20 years in prison but was freed after serving less than three years.

== Personal life ==
Richard William Miller was born in Wilmington, California in 1936. He graduated from high school in Lynwood, California. He completed a two-year mission for the Church of Jesus Christ of Latter-day Saints to Latino communities in Texas, and then attended Compton Junior College. He was a 1963 graduate of Brigham Young University, and a 20-year veteran of the FBI at the time of his arrest.

Colleagues who knew Miller described him as "bumbling", "inept", and "lunchy". The last description referred to his unkempt appearance, and the fact that he often was observed with food crumbs and stains on his clothing. Former FBI Special Agent and author Gary Aldrich described Miller in this manner:

Most agents assigned to Los Angeles during that time who knew Miller would probably agree that he should never have been hired in the first place. How he even got through the FBI Academy was a big mystery. But how Miller avoided losing his job for being one of the dumbest, most unkempt, most unpopular misfits the agency had ever hired was not a mystery. The management should have watched Miller more carefully.

Additionally, according to a Washington Monthly article by Matthew Miller (no relation), Miller was described in this fashion:

After 20 years with the bureau, Miller had a personnel file filled with doubts about his job performance. His superiors had repeatedly admonished him to control his ballooning weight. And in 1982, a psychologist examined Miller and told the FBI that he was emotionally unstable and should be nurtured along in some harmless post until retirement.

During a September, 1986 segment for the CBS news program 60 Minutes, colleagues interviewed on camera observed that Miller had been such a sub-par performer that he had at one time lost his gun and FBI credentials.

== Arrest ==
On October 3, 1984, Miller was arrested with Svetlana and Nikolai Ogorodnikov, Russian immigrants who had moved to Los Angeles in 1973 to seek refuge, but were access agents of the Soviet KGB. Miller was alleged to have provided classified documents, including an FBI Counterintelligence manual, to the Ogorodnikovs after demanding $50,000 in gold and $15,000 cash in return. Miller, who had eight children and was faced with financial difficulties, was having an affair with the married Svetlana Ogorodnikov, and was preparing to travel with her to Vienna at the time of his arrest. It was later alleged that Svetlana Ogorodnikov had been in touch with a KGB case officer working out of the Soviet Consulate in San Francisco and had made arrangements for Miller to meet with the KGB in Vienna.

After his arrest, a fuller portrait emerged of Miller. According to news accounts, Miller occasionally took three-hour "lunches" at the 7-Eleven near his Los Angeles office, gorging himself on stolen candy bars while reading comic books. He was alleged to have cheated his uncle by selling a muscle-relaxant device the uncle had patented, and to have skimmed bureau cash intended for an informant. Miller also ran vehicle registration checks and searched FBI criminal indexes for a local private investigator at $500 per search. In early 1984, the LDS Church excommunicated Miller for adultery. He was divorced from his wife Paula while awaiting trial.

== First and second trials ==
After a 10-week trial, in June 1985 each Ogorodnikov pleaded guilty to one count of conspiracy. Nikolai Ogorodnikov was immediately sentenced to eight years imprisonment. His wife received a sentence of 18 years, but maintained that Miller had never provided her with any classified information. Miller pleaded not guilty, and after 11 weeks of testimony, a mistrial was declared, with two jurors later indicating they believed Miller's claim of attempting to infiltrate the KGB without the knowledge of his superiors.

At his second trial, which ended on June 19, 1986, Miller again claimed his actions were the result of unapproved attempts to infiltrate the KGB as a double agent. Miller was found guilty of espionage and bribery, and on July 14, 1986, he was sentenced to two consecutive life terms plus 50 years. These convictions were overturned in 1989 on the grounds that U.S. District Judge David Vreeland Kenyon erred in admitting polygraph evidence during the trial. In October 1989, Miller was granted bail while awaiting a new trial.

Nikolai Ogorodnikov was released from prison in February 1990. He worked as a bus driver for a Los Angeles hotel, but the U.S. government later identified him as a security risk, targeted him for deportation, and held him in prison in Virginia during the proceedings. As of 2019, he was a resident of Beverly Hills, California.

== Third trial ==
For Miller's third trial, the lead prosecutor was Assistant U.S. Attorney Adam Schiff. On October 9, 1990, Miller was again convicted on all counts. On February 4, 1991, he was sentenced to 20 years in federal prison. On January 28, 1993, a Federal Appeals Court upheld his conviction. He later reported that during one of his prison terms he befriended fellow inmate Lyndon LaRouche. Schiff recounts his work on the Miller trial in his 2021 book Midnight in Washington.

While in prison, Miller trained to become a computer technician. On May 6, 1994, he was released from prison following the reduction of his sentence to 13 years by a federal judge. Svetlana Ogorodnikova was released the same year. She was targeted for deportation, but married Bruce Perlowin, a convicted drug trafficker she met while in prison, then moved to Tijuana, Mexico. After several years in Tijuana, she and her husband entered the U.S. illegally and resided in Fallbrook, California. In 2002, Ogorodnikova testified in the trial of Kimberly Bailey, who was accused of attempting to hire a hitman to kill witnesses to the murder of Bailey's boyfriend, private investigator Richard Post. The FBI approached Ogorodnikova, who knew Bailey, and was suspected of involvement in the plot, and Ogorodnikova agreed to covertly tape conversations with Bailey. Ogorodnikova also arranged a meeting between Bailey and the supposed hitman, who was in fact an FBI agent. Perlowin and Ogorodnikova were later active as entrepreneurs in the medical marijuana and hemp industries.

== Later life ==
Following his release, Miller relocated to Northern Utah. He married Tamara Lewis on September 23, 1995. Miller died in Utah on October 16, 2013.

== See also ==
- Sexpionage

== Additional references ==
- Howe, Russell Warren, Sleeping with the FBI: Sex, Booze, Russians and the Saga of an American Counterspy Who Couldn't, Washington, DC, National Press Books, 1993
- Verbitsky, Anatole, and Dick Adler, Sleeping with Moscow: The Authorized Account of the KGB's Bungled Infiltration of the FBI by Two of the Soviet Union's Most Unlikely Operatives, New York, Shapolsky, 1987
- "The FBI Managing Disaster?", Gary Aldrich, Law Enforcement Alliance Of America Website
- "Ma'am, what you need is a new, improved Hoover - J. Edgar Hoover: Management of FBI", Washington Monthly, Mathew Miller, January 1989
