= Ataka & Co. =

Ataka & Co. (安宅産業, Ataka Sangyo) was a major Japanese general trading company headquartered in Osaka.

Ataka opened its first US office in 1918 and had 39 overseas offices around the end of World War II in 1945. Like other Japanese trading companies, it embarked on a major overseas business expansion in the 1950s with new offices in the United States, Southeast Asia and South America. In the late 1950s it developed an iron mining operation in Malaya and a copper mining operation in Chile to meet Japanese consumption needs.

Ataka suffered major losses from an oil development project in the United States around 1975, and underwent extensive business and personnel restructuring at the direction of its main lender, Sumitomo Bank. As a result of this restructuring, its profitable iron and steel trading operation merged into C. Itoh & Co. in 1977. Sumitomo lost nearly $1 billion in the Ataka restructuring, but claimed that a complete collapse of Ataka could have major repercussions on other Japanese trading companies and on the Japanese economy in general. The liquidation of Ataka, combined with the contemporaneous bailout of Mazda, had a major impact on Sumitomo's finances, driving it down from the most profitable bank in Japan to being only ninth-ranked.
