= Marubeni =

Japanese company

Marubeni Corporation

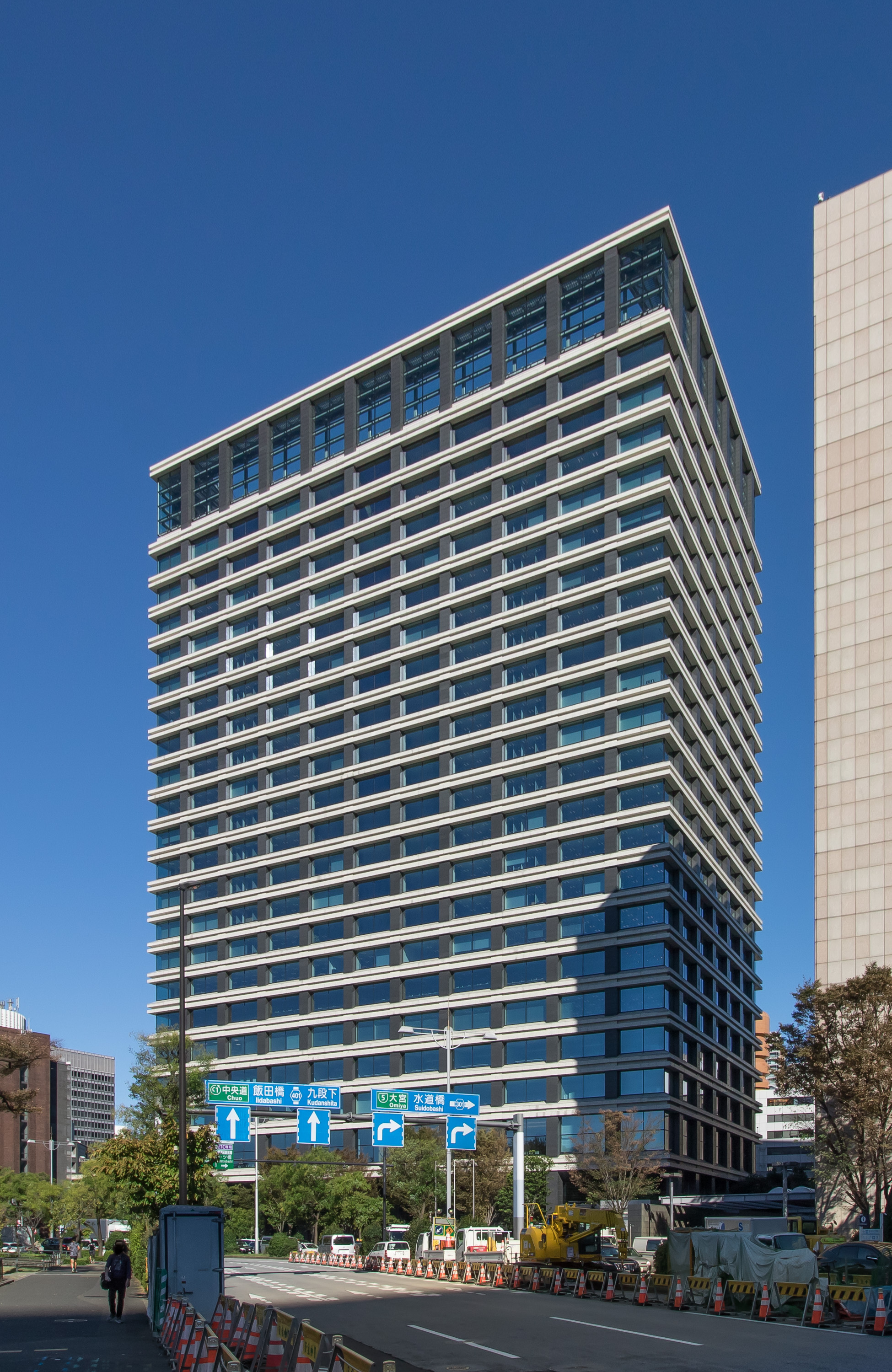
- Head office in Otemachi, Tokyo
- Native name: 丸紅株式会社
- Romanized name: Marubeni kabushiki-gaisha
- Formerly: Marubeni-Iida (1955–1972)
- Type: Public
- Traded as: TYO: 8002
- Industry: General trading company
- Founded: 1858; 168 years ago
- Headquarters: The Marubeni Building, 4-2, Otemachi 1-chome, Chiyoda, Tokyo, Japan
- Key people: Fumiya Kokubu (chairman); Masumi Kakinoki (president and CEO)
- Revenue: ▲¥6,332 billion (Mar. 31 2021)
- Net income: ▲¥225 billion (Mar. 2021)
- Total assets: ▲¥6,938 billion (Mar. 2021)
- Total equity: ▲¥1,912 billion (Mar. 2021)
- Owner: The Master Trust Bank of Japan Ltd. (Trust Account) (15.43%); Custody Bank of Japan, Ltd. (Trust Account) (6.86%); BNYM AS AGT/CLTS NON TREAT JASDEC] (6.01%); Meiji Yasuda Life Insurance Company (2.41%); Mizuho Bank, Ltd. (1.73%); STATE STREET BANK WEST CLIENT-TREATY 505234 (1.52%); The Dai-ichi Life Insurance Company (1.35%); JPMorgan Securities Japan Co., Ltd.(1.23%) (1.35%)
- Number of employees: 45,470 including subsidiaries (Mar. 2021)
- Website: marubeni.com

Marubeni Corporation (丸紅株式会社, Marubeni Kabushiki-gaisha) (TYO: 8002, OSE: 8002, NSE: 8002) is a sōgō shōsha (general trading company) headquartered in Otemachi, Chiyoda, Tokyo, Japan. It is one of the largest sogo shosha and has leading market shares in cereal and paper pulp trading as well as a strong electrical and industrial plant business. Marubeni is a member of the Fuyo keiretsu.

== History ==
Marubeni was founded in 1858, where the founder Chubei Itoh moved out of the family business and started a linen trading business with his uncle. It was established in 1918 as Itochu Shoten, Ltd. in a spin-off of certain sales divisions of C. Itoh & Co. (Itochu) into a separate entity. Itochu Shoten merged with Itoh Chobei Shoten in 1921 to form Marubeni Shoten, Ltd. under the leadership of Chobei Itoh IX. Marubeni started out as a textile trading firm and expanded to trade in other consumer and industrial goods during the 1920s.

Marubeni was re-combined with Itochu during World War II to form Sanko Kabushiki Kaisha Ltd. (1941–44) and Daiken Company, Ltd. (1944–48). This conglomerate was dismantled in the wake of the war and Marubeni again emerged as a separate trading company in 1949. Post-war Marubeni was predominantly a textile trading firm at its outset, but diversified into machinery, metals and chemicals, with textiles barely forming a majority of its business by the end of the decade.

Marubeni merged with Takashimaya-Iida, a trading company that owned the Takashimaya department store chain, in 1955, changing its name to Marubeni-Iida from 1955 to 1972. The merger was orchestrated by Fuji Bank in order to create a stronger trading company partner for the bank's corporate customers. Marubeni and Fuji Bank developed a network of corporate clients which was formalized as the Fuyo Group keiretsu in the 1960s, paralleling the development of the DKB Group and Sanwa Group. The Fuyo Group included Hitachi, Nissan, Canon, Showa Denko, Kubota and Nippon Steel.

Marubeni, like other sogo shosha, was hit hard by the collapse of the Japanese asset price bubble in the early 1990s and recorded its first annual net loss in 1998. The company again booked massive losses as part of a restructuring in 2001, with its stock price plummeting to 58 yen per share in December 2001.

Marubeni acquired a large minority stake in the Daiei supermarket chain in 2006, which it sold to Æon Group in 2013.

The Tokyo Stock Exchange recognized Marubeni as the best Japanese company at increasing enterprise value in 2013, citing management's efforts to maximize return on equity.

In September 2018, The Russian Direct Investment Fund (RDIF), Marubeni Corporation and Russia's AEON Corporation agreed to develop an industrial facility in Volgograd. The total investment is estimated at over $800 million with construction due to start in 2020.

In September 2018, Marubeni announced to shift from coal to renewable energy resources.

Berkshire Hathaway acquired over 5% of the stock in the company, along with four other Japanese trading houses, over the 12-month period ending in August 2020.

In October 2021, Marubeni invested in B2U Storage Solutions, a Santa Monica-based startup that reuses EV batteries to a battery storage system.

In January 2022, Marubeni won the sea bed rights of Scotland to construct an offshore wind farm. They have partnered with SSE Renewables and Copenhagen Infrastructure Partners. In addition, Marubeni is working on Japan's first offshore wind farm as well as floating turbine demonstrations.

In January 2026, Marubeni announced it acquired Jacobson Group, owner of Gola footwear.

== Offices ==
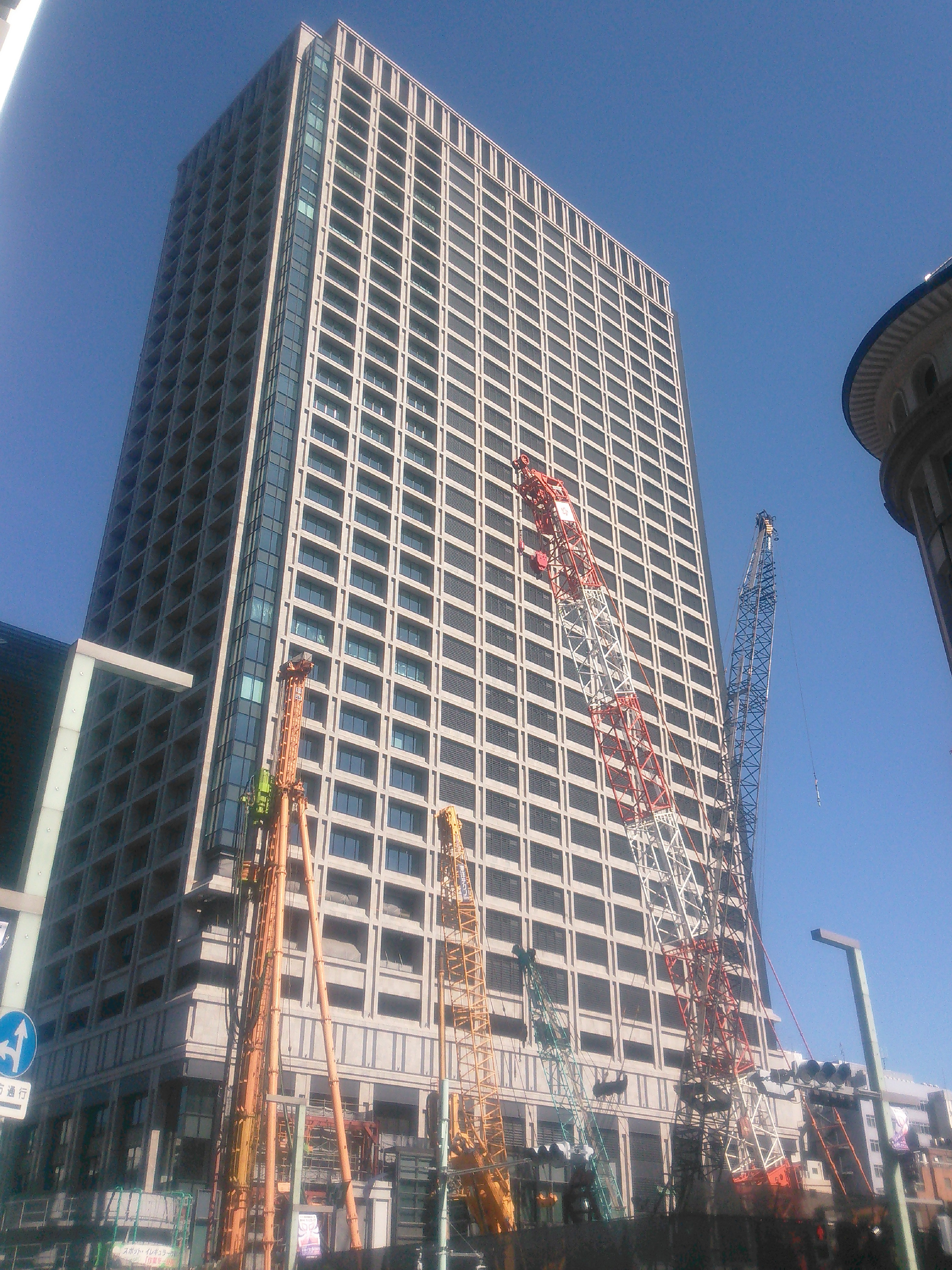
Previous head office in Nihonbashi, Chuo, Tokyo, Japan

Marubeni's head office moved to the Tokyo Nihombashi Tower in 2016. The company constructed a new dedicated head office building in 2021 and moved back to the original place in Chiyoda.

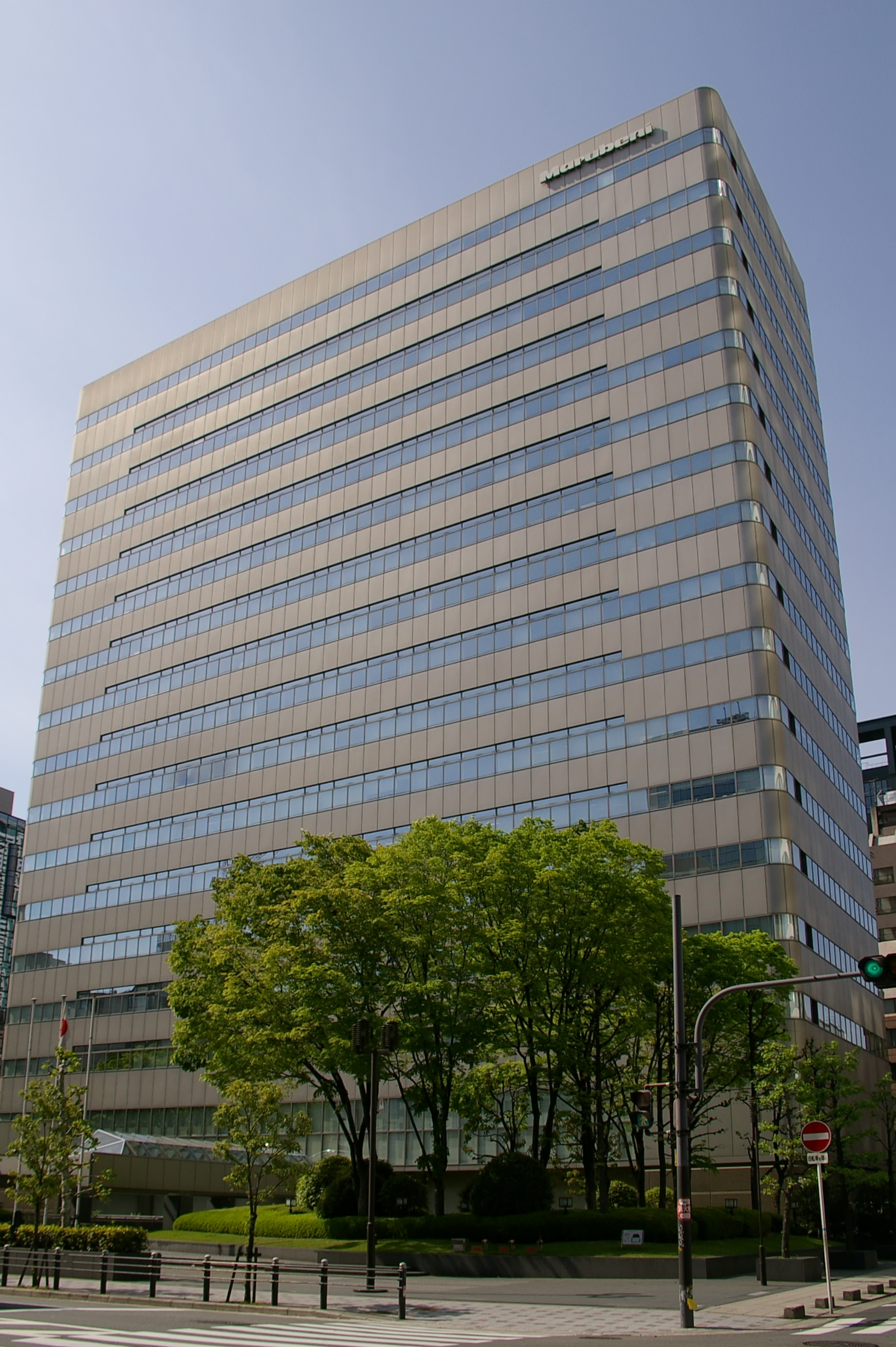
Previous Osaka Office in Hommachi, Chuo-ku, Osaka, Japan

The company has a total of twelve offices in Japan, 58 overseas offices and 29 overseas subsidiaries with 33 offices.

The head office of Marubeni in Otemachi (Tokyo) operates the Marubeni Gallery museum, which holds exhibitions mainly of textiles and paintings.

== Business ==
Marubeni Corporation and its consolidated subsidiaries use their broad business networks, both within Japan and overseas, to conduct importing and exporting (including third country trading), as well as domestic business, encompassing a diverse range of business activities across wide-ranging fields including lifestyle, ICT & real estate business, forest products, food, agri business, chemicals, energy, metals & mineral resources, power business, infrastructure project, aerospace & ship, finance & leasing business, construction, industrial machinery & mobility, and next generation business development. Additionally, the Marubeni Group offers a variety of services, makes internal and external investments, and is involved in resource development throughout all of the above industries.

Marubeni's business is organized in six groups (as of March 2022):

- Consumer Products Group – Lifestyle, ICT & Real Estate, Forest Products. Trades in apparel, functional materials and rubber, and provides logistics, insurance, finance, real estate services, pulp and paper. Has a strategic partnership with Want Want China.
- Food, Agriculture & Chemicals Group – Food, Agri Business, Chemicals. Trades in grain and food products, distributes solar panels and energy storage units. One major unit is the Helena Chemical Company, the second-largest agricultural chemical distributor in the US, which Marubeni acquired from Bayer in 1987.
- Energy & Metals Group - Trades in oil, gas, nuclear fuel, iron, steel, and other metals and minerals.
- Power Business & Infrastructure Group - Develops power plants, environmental plants, marine projects, industrial plants and transport infrastructure. Projects include the Westermost Rough Wind Farm in the UK, FSRU and FPSO projects in South America, and operation of the G:link light rail in Australia. Other subsidiary companies include SmartestEnergy, an electricity supplier and aggregator focusing on renewable energy, Solacle, a platform for buying Marubeni owned solar power stations, and Denki.
- Transportation & Industrial Machinery, Financial Business Group - Trades in aircraft (Aircastle), ships, automobiles, and construction and industrial machinery. The Marubeni Aerospace Corporation is a major component of this group, making up part of the group's Aerospace & Ship Division . MAC was formed in 1998 when Marubeni acquired the trading rights and other assets of the former aerospace division of Okura & Co., Ltd. (Okura Aerospace Co., Ltd.) In 2000, Marubeni obtained UK based Automotive dealer group, the RRG Group.

== Notable people ==
- Minoru Arakawa worked in overseas real estate development at Marubeni during the 1970s prior to founding Nintendo of America in 1980.
- Yohei Kono, member of the House of Representatives and former Foreign Minister, worked at Marubeni from 1959 to 1967 before entering politics.
- Toshimitsu Motegi, member of the House of Representatives and former State Minister and minister of foreign affairs in the Shinzo Abe and Yoshihide Suga governments, worked at Marubeni before entering politics.

== Scandals and incidents ==
In the early 1970s Marubeni was accused of hoarding rice on the black market for profiteering purposes. In 1976, numerous Marubeni and All Nippon Airways executives were arrested in connection with the bribery of Japanese government officials to support the sales of Lockheed aircraft in Japan; the scandal also led to several suicides and the arrest of Prime Minister Kakuei Tanaka. In 1986, Marubeni was found to have bribed Filipino President Ferdinand Marcos and several of his friends and associates in connection with Japanese ODA work in the Philippines.

In January 2012, Marubeni Corporation agreed to pay a US$54.6 million criminal penalty to settle multiple US Foreign Corrupt Practices Act (FCPA) charges relating to its work as an agent for the TSKJ joint venture. The TSKJ joint venture comprising Technip, Snamprogetti Netherlands, Kellogg Brown & Root (KBR) and JGC Corporation hired Marubeni to bribe lower-level Nigerian government officials to help it achieve contracts to build LNG facilities on Bonny Island in Nigeria. TSKJ paid Marubeni US$51 million which was intended, in part, to be used toward Nigerian officials. Two years later, and just months after its final settlement in the Nigerian case, Marubeni was charged under the FCPA for bribing Indonesian officials in order to secure a $118 million power project contract for a joint venture between Marubeni and Alstom; it agreed to pay an $88 million fine in connection with this case.

Marubeni Corporation continued its business operations in Russia despite international sanctions and geopolitical tensions following Russia's invasion of Ukraine. The company’s decision to maintain activities in the region attracted criticism from organizations advocating for ethical corporate practices during global conflicts.

== See also ==
- Factorenergia
