= Sogo shosha =

Japanese general trading companies

Seven major sōgō shōsha (billions of yen)
Name	Earnings (FY 2023)	Market capitalisation (May. 2024)
Mitsubishi	1,181	13,803
Mitsui	1,130	12,064
Itochu	801	11,744
Sumitomo	566	4,991
Marubeni	543	5,129
Toyota Tsusho	284	3,377
Sojitz	111	923

Sogo shosha (総合商社, sōgō shōsha; or general trading companies) are Japanese wholesale companies that trade in a wide range of products and materials. In addition to acting as intermediaries, sōgō shōsha also engage in logistics, plant development and other services, as well as international resource exploration. Unlike trading companies in other countries, which are generally specialized in certain types of products, sōgō shōsha have extremely diversified business lines, in which respect the business model is unique to Japan.

The structure of sōgō shōsha can give them advantages in international trade. First, they have extensive risk management capabilities in that they trade in many markets, keep balances in many foreign currencies and can generate captive supply and demand for their own operations. They also have large-scale in-house market information systems which give them economies of scale in pursuing new business opportunities. Their vast scale also allows them to provide capital in the form of credit, financing and export services at low cost. Mitsui CEO Masami Iijima described general trading companies as similar to investment funds such as private equity funds, but distinguished by their ability to identify and implement business opportunities in various industries using the information and human resources gleaned from their trading business.

Sōgō shōsha are among the highest-paying employers in Japan. Along with financial institutions, these companies have consistently been ranked among the most popular employers for the graduates of top Japanese universities for over thirty years due to their high compensation levels, employment stability and the diversity of opportunities available to prospective employees, of which has made the recruitment process highly competitive.

== Historical background ==
After the opening of Japan in the mid-1800s, trade between Japan and the outside world was initially dominated by foreign merchants and traders from Western countries. As Japan modernized, a number of existing family-run conglomerates known as zaibatsu (most notably Mitsubishi and Mitsui) developed captive trading companies to coordinate production, transportation and financing between the various enterprises within the group. A number of smaller and more specialized Japanese firms, particularly in the cotton supply industry, also took on a larger role in acting as intermediaries for foreign trade, initially in importing raw cotton and later in exporting finished products. These companies were characterized by handling a variety of products, targeting various regions for their trading, establishing modern institutionalized risk management methods for their trading, and making substantial investments in domestic industrial operations.

After World War II, foreign trade was briefly suspended and the zaibatsu were dismantled. The powerful trading arms of Mitsui and Mitsubishi were each dissolved into over a hundred smaller businesses. When trade resumed in 1950, the first diversified trading companies emerged as Kansai region-based textile traders (most notably Itochu, Marubeni, Toyo Cotton and Nichimen) and steel traders (most notably Iwai and Nissho, which later merged to form Nissho Iwai) diversified into new business lines. The remnants of the Mitsubishi and Mitsui zaibatsu also coalesced in the 1950s to form new large-scale trading concerns. The term sōgō shōsha came into use around 1955 to refer to this broad set of firms, which by 1960 had coalesced into ten large and highly diversified companies:

- Ataka & Co. (collapsed in 1977; iron and steel arm merged with C. Itoh)
- C. Itoh & Co. (now Itochu)
- Kanematsu Corporation (recharacterized as a specialized trading company in 1999)
- Marubeni
- Mitsubishi Corporation
- Mitsui & Co.
- Nichimen (now Sojitz)
- Nissho Iwai (now Sojitz)
- Sumitomo Corporation
- Toyota Tsusho Corporation

Sōgō shōsha became a core component of the postwar "keiretsu" business model, in which large commercial banks played a central role in each major keiretsu with a sōgō shōsha playing a secondary central role that diminished over time.

Until the 1980s, sōgō shōsha operations were largely concentrated on supporting Japanese manufacturers' international transactions, particularly in the textile and chemical industries. Since then, Japanese manufacturers have taken a more direct role in international procurement, sales and marketing, and the sōgō shōsha have shifted their business focus to services such as finance, insurance, transportation, project management and real estate development, with much of this business conducted outside Japan through local subsidiaries and affiliates.

The collapse of the Japanese asset price bubble in the early 1990s led to a wave of mergers and reorganizations among sōgō shōsha, reducing their total number to seven.

Headquarters of major sōgō shōsha
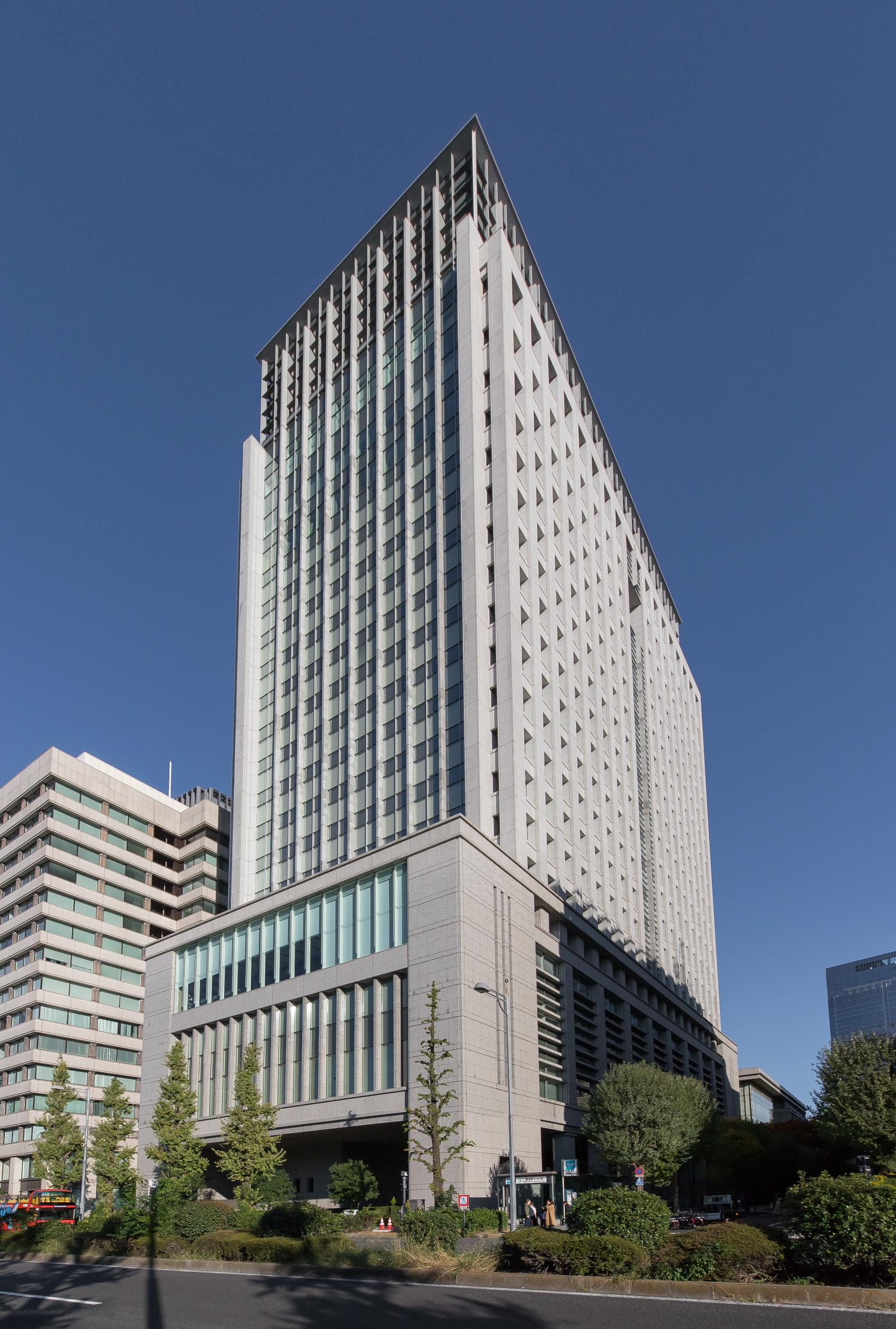
Mitsubishi
(Marunouchi, Tokyo)

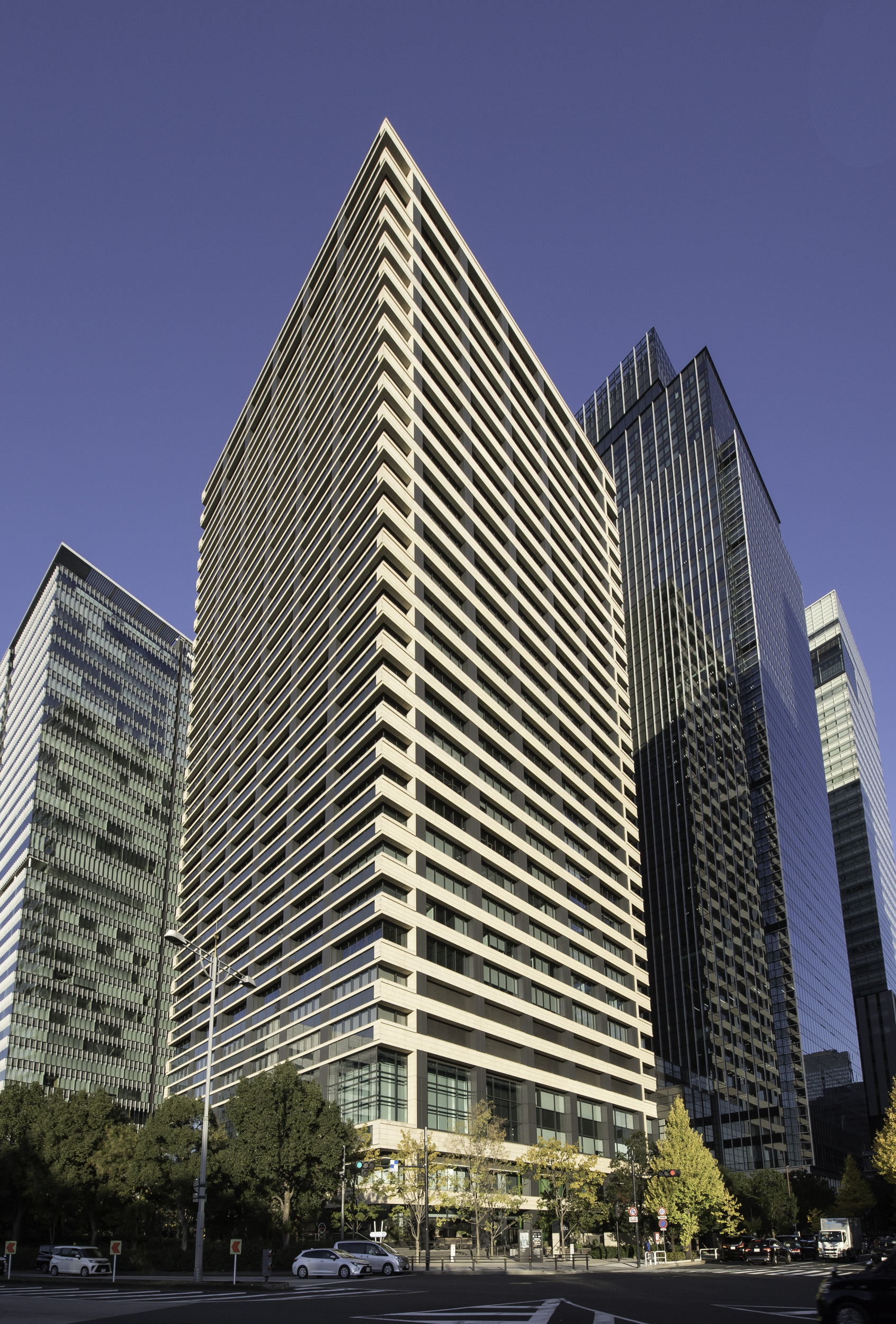
Mitsui
(Otemachi, Tokyo)

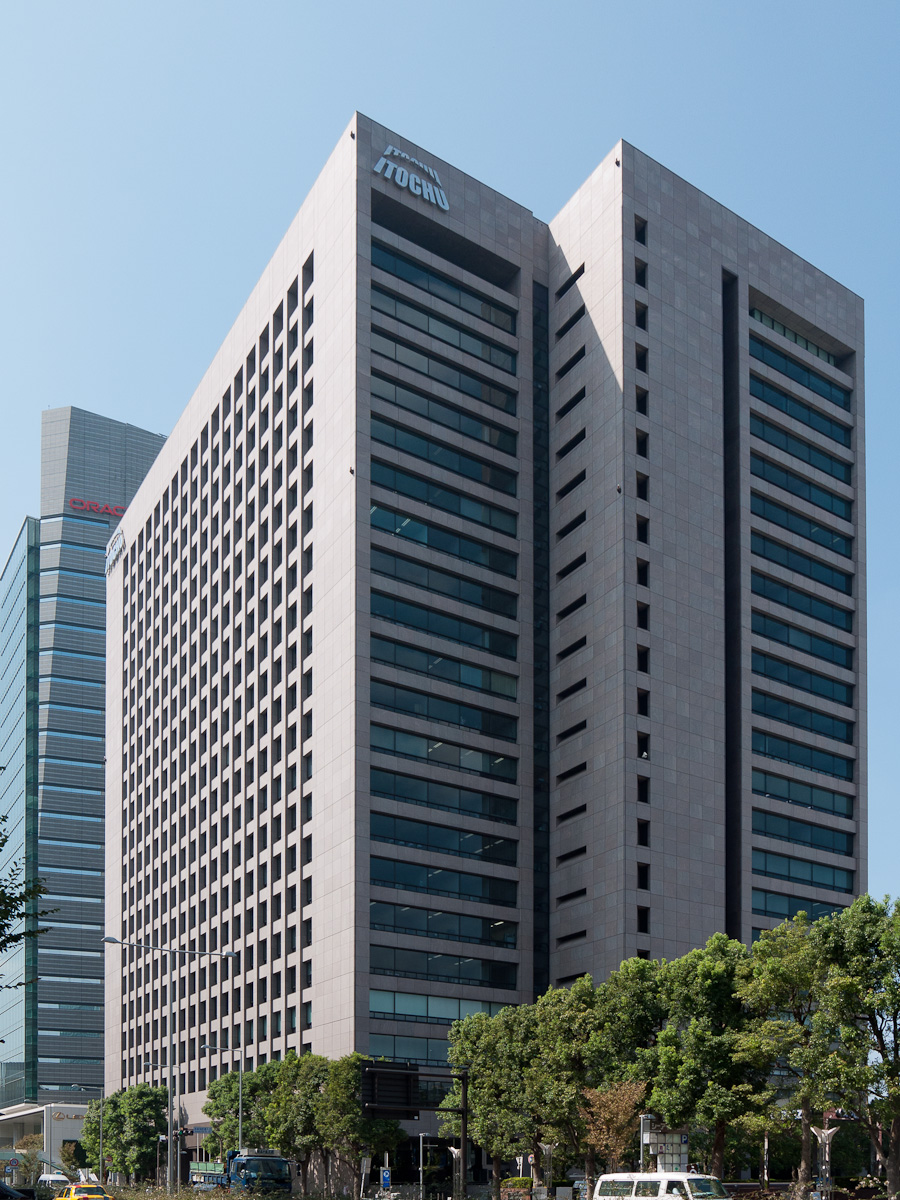
Itochu
(Aoyama, Tokyo)

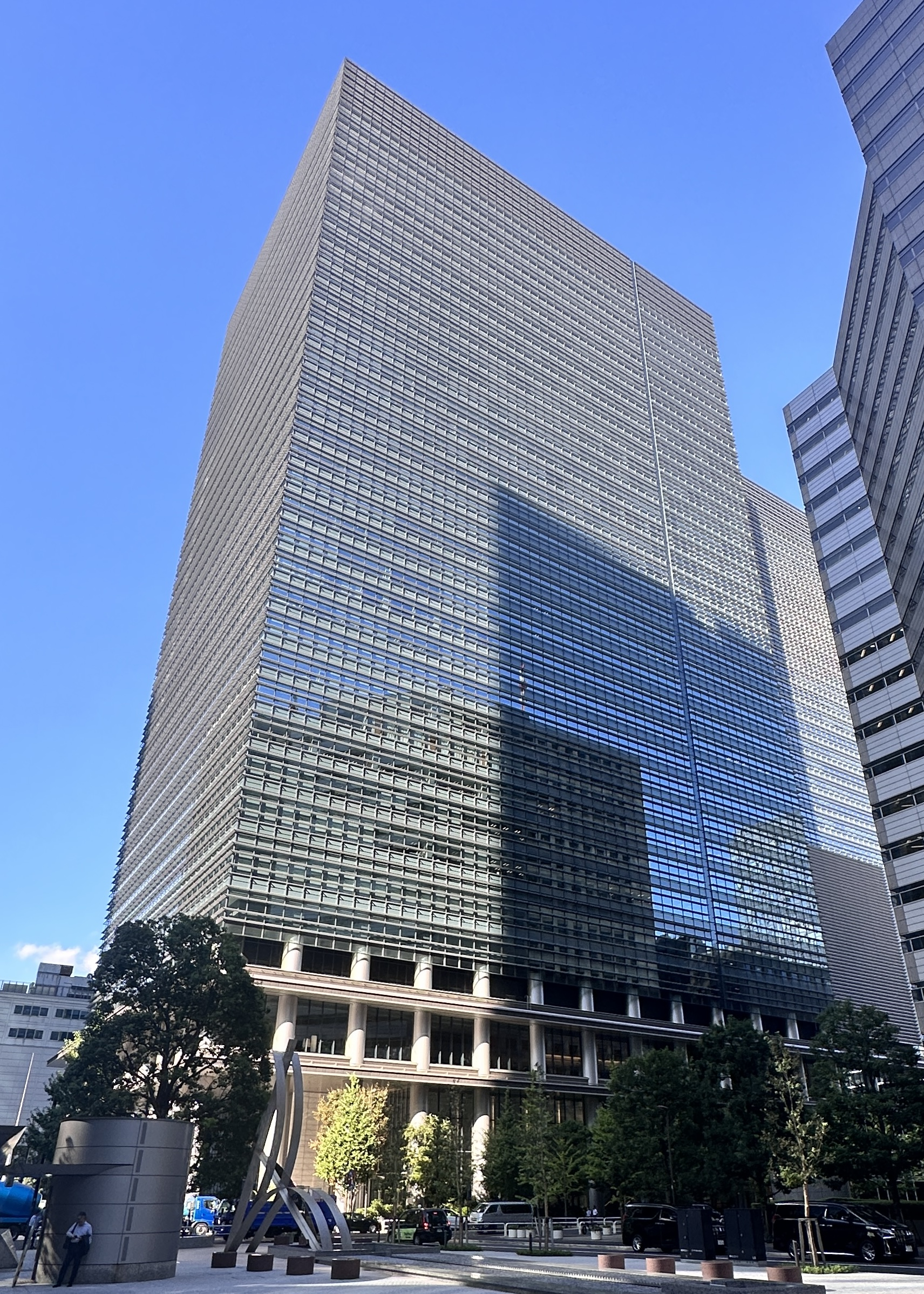
Sumitomo
(Harumi, Tokyo)

== Parallels in other countries ==
Sōgō shōsha developed in Japan as a result of several factors unique to Japan. Japan's geographical remoteness and unique language and culture all served to increase the costs of information and negotiation. Its closure from the outside world for over 200 years meant that trade had to be developed in a very short period of time relative to Europe, where networks could naturally develop over a longer period of time. Japan also lacked effective capital markets to fund companies, and its industrial base was largely composed of cottage industry enterprises that could not market on their own, in contrast to the larger firms prevalent in the West.

The chaebol of South Korea followed a similar path of developing trading companies in the mid-1970s. Similar conglomerate type organizations exist in India such as the Reliance Group and Tata Group.

The United States also attempted to emulate the business model to promote exports in the early 1980s by enacting the Export Trading Company Act of 1982.

At the time the law was debated, Mitsui & Co. was the sixth-largest exporter from the United States, and sogo shosha accounted for about half of Japan's inbound and outbound trade.

== See also ==
- Oguri Kozukenosuke
- CoBank
- Export credit agency § List of export credit agencies
