= Stephen Cohen (entrepreneur) =

American computer scientist (born 1982)

- Born: September 30, 1982 (age 44); California, U.S.
- Education: Stanford University (BS)
- Occupations: Entrepreneur, president
- Known for: Co-founder and president at Palantir Technologies
- Board member of: Palantir

Stephen Andrew Cohen (born September 30, 1982) is an American computer scientist and entrepreneur best known as a co-founder, president and secretary of Palantir Technologies, a platform for analyzing integration and visualizing data used by governments and businesses. He is credited with creating the initial prototype of Palantir in eight weeks. Since then, he has interviewed over 4,500 candidates and continues to be actively involved in Palantir. Previously to Palantir, Cohen worked with Peter Thiel at Clarium Capital. He also served as an adviser to BackType prior to its acquisition by Twitter in 2011. Cohen is a billionaire. By 9 August 2026, Forbes estimated his net worth as $6.1 billion.

== Early life ==
Cohen was born on September 30, 1982, and is of Ashkenazi Jewish descent.

Cohen graduated from Stanford University with a B.S. in computer science in 2005. While at Stanford he focused on machine learning, artificial intelligence, and natural language processing and did research with professor Andrew Ng, director of the Stanford Artificial Intelligence Lab.

== Career ==
=== Pre-Palantir experiences ===
Cohen earned a Bachelor of Science degree in computer science from Stanford University, completing his studies around 2003. Prior to co-founding Palantir, Cohen held the position of principal at Clarium Capital Management LLC, a global macro hedge fund established by Peter Thiel in 2002. This role involved working closely with Thiel, whose prior experience at PayPal and investment philosophy influenced early data analytics initiatives that later informed Palantir's development.

Cohen's time at Clarium provided exposure to quantitative analysis and financial modeling, bridging his academic background in software engineering with practical applications in data-intensive environments. These experiences positioned him to contribute technically to Palantir's prototype, which was developed shortly after under Thiel's initial funding in 2004

=== Palantir ===
Palantir Technologies was established in 2003 by Peter Thiel, a co-founder of PayPal, who sought to adapt fraud detection software techniques to intelligence analysis for counterterrorism purposes following the September 11th attacks. Thiel assembled a team including Alex Karp as CEO, Joe Lonsdale, a student from Stanford University, and Nathan Gettings, a former early PayPal engineer, incorporating the company in May of that year.

According to Steinberger, In the beginning, Karp, Gettings, Cohen, and Lonsdale personally met every job seeker, and all four had to approve each hire. In 2025, Nabeel Qureshi, a former Palantir engineer who left the company in 2023, told Business Insider that the hiring practice was that each candidate would be interviewed by one of the founders. Qureshi noted that Cohen would ask candidates about topics that were "impossible to prepare for", like philosophy, and tended to "pick a topic out of thin air."

==== Recent developments and share sales ====
On September 30, 2020, Cohen sold nearly 4 million shares in conjunction with the company’s initial public offering, generating approximately $38 million in proceeds. On February 20 and 21, 2025, Cohen sold shares totaling approximately $69.3 million. The transactions included 301,847 shares sold on February 21 at a price of $102.14 per share, amounting to $30.8 million. On the previous day, multiple sales were executed at prices ranging from $96.43 to $108.28 per share, generating proceeds of $38.4 million. In March 2025, he sold additional shares valued at over $310 million, representing around 23% of his total stake in the company, under a trading plan adopted in December 2024.

== Personal life ==
Cohen is known for his working discipline. Steinberger describes him as often retreating to the conference room without emerging for hours, and still pulling all-nighters.
