= Grant Moves South =

1983 American Civil War wargame

- Cover art by Bill Haggart
- Designers: Jon Southard
- Illustrators: Rodger B. MacGowan; Bill Haggart; Jan Johns
- Publishers: Quarterdeck Games
- Publication: 1983
- Genres: American Civil War

Grant Moves South, subtitled "The Fort Donalson–Shiloh Campaign", is a board wargame published by Quarterdeck Games in 1983 that simulates the West Tennessee campaign of Ulysses S. Grant in 1862 during the American Civil War from the siege of Fort Donelson to the Battle of Shiloh.

== Background ==
In August 1861, Ulysses S. Grant was promoted from colonel of the 21st Illinois Volunteer Infantry Regiment to brigadier general and rapidly made a name for himself in the Western Campaign, forcing the surrender of both Fort Belmont and Fort Donelson. Abraham Lincoln promoted Grant to major general, and Grant took his army south into Tennessee, seeking to take control of major Confederate towns. Faced with Grant's superior numbers, Confederate forces withdrew, waiting for an advantageous opportunity. At Shiloh, as Grant waited for reinforcements to be shuttled across the Missouri River, the Confederates attacked.

== Description ==
Grant Moves South is a board wargame for 2 players, where one player controls Union forces, while the other controls Confederate forces. The game has 200 counters and the rules have been described as of medium complexity. The 22" x 27" hex grid map is scaled at 5.25 miles (8.45 km) per hex.

The game combines land and river combat, and the rivers are also necessary for the Union forces to stay supplied. The late winter weather is a major factor, as rain happens frequently, blocking infantry movement across rivers and doubling movement costs on land.

The game uses double-sided counters to simulate the fog of war by reducing the information known by each player about opposing units: Counters start the game flipped over to their reverse side, revealing the type of unit, but not its the strength. The counters are only flipped over to reveal their full information when they are engaged in battle.

=== Victory conditions ===
Both sides receive Victory Points (VPs) for reducing enemy strength points and eliminating leaders. In addition, the Union player receives VPs for capturing Corinth, Memphis and Nashville, and the Confederate player receives points for capturing Cairo, Paducah and Smithland.

The game lasts for 18 turns, representing 4 days each. The player with the most VPs at the end of the game is the winner.

== Publication history ==
Quarterdeck Games was known for their naval combat wargames such as Ironbottom Sound and Destroyer Captain. It was Jon Southard's first game design, and was released as Quarterdeck's first land-based game in 1983 with cover art by Bill Haggart and interior art by Rodger B. MacGowan and Jan Johns.

== Reception ==
In Issue 26 of The Wargamer, Roger Nord liked the quality of the back-printed counters, but found that the dark colors of the map obscured forest terrain and made reading black lettering on the map difficult. Despite that, Nord found it "a playable, fascinating game." Nord especially liked the combat rules, calling them "the best part of the game." Nord did find some problems in the rules, pointing out that a Union army of 25,000 men that historically operated in the area under the command of General John Pope is completely absent from the game. Nord also felt the rules failed to make river boats and combat on the rivers historically accurate. Despite these problems, Nord concluded that the game "is a strategically challenging strategic simulation, especially if all optional rules are used ... For a first effort, designer Southard has done a commendable job. While the price tag ($22.50) is steep, the game is a must for Civil War enthusiasts."

Writing for the Australian game magazine Queensland Wargamer, Jack Ford called this game "an excellent simulation." Ford was also not a fan of the map graphics, complaining "Although the greens and browns add to the feel of the ruggedness of the terrain, it also makes some features hard to distinguish." Ford felt that naval rules favored the Union player, and pointed out that the rule making Union ships invulnerable to shellfire should only apply to the Union's ironclads, not to their wooden ships. Despite these issues, Ford concluded, "In the end, GMS is a gripping game ... Any two experienced gamers will find the victory will not be decided until the last turn!"

== Awards ==
At the 1984 Origins Awards, Grant Moves South was a finalist in the category "Best Pre-Twentieth Century Game".
