= Palantir =

US-based software and services company

Palantir Technologies Inc.

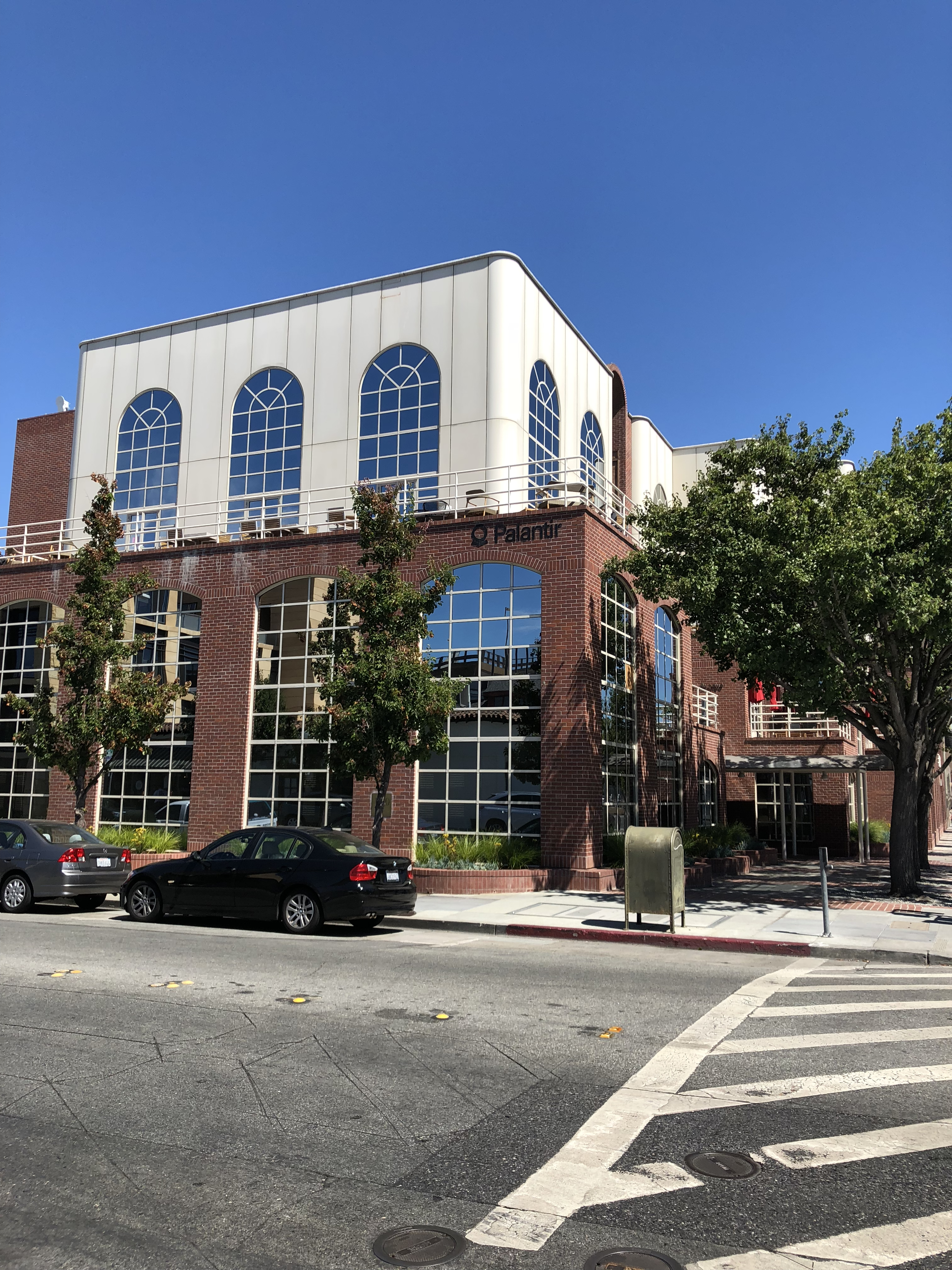
- Former headquarters in Palo Alto, California
- Type: Public
- Traded as: Nasdaq: PLTR (Class A); Nasdaq-100 component; S&P 100 component; S&P 500 component
- Industry: Software, AI
- Founded: May 6, 2003 (23 years ago)
- Founders: Peter Thiel; Stephen Cohen; Alex Karp; Joe Lonsdale; Nathan Gettings
- Headquarters: Miami, Florida, U.S.
- Key people: Peter Thiel (chairman); Alex Karp (CEO); Stephen Cohen (president)
- Products: Palantir Gotham; Palantir Foundry; Palantir Apollo
- Revenue: ▲US$4.48 billion (2025)
- Operating income: ▲US$1.41 billion (2025)
- Net income: ▲US$1.63 billion (2025)
- Total assets: ▲US$8.90 billion (2025)
- Total equity: ▲US$7.39 billion (2025)
- Number of employees: 4,429 (2025)
- Website: palantir.com

Palantir Technologies Inc. (/ˈpælənˌtɪər/ PAL-ən-TEER) is an American publicly traded company that develops data integration and analytics software. Palantir is currently headquartered in Miami, Florida. It was founded in Palo Alto, California in 2003 by Peter Thiel, Alex Karp, Stephen Cohen, Joe Lonsdale, and Nathan Gettings.

Palantir's customer base includes federal agencies, state and local governments, international organizations, and also private companies. The company has four main operating systems: Gotham, Foundry, Apollo, and AIP. Gotham is an intelligence tool used by militaries and counter-terrorism analysts, including the United States Intelligence Community and United States Department of Defense. Multiple police departments have used Gotham for crime analysis. Apollo is a platform to facilitate continuous integration/continuous delivery (CI/CD) across all environments.

Its software as a service (SaaS) is one of five offerings the U.S. Department of Defense authorized for Mission Critical National Security Systems (IL5). Palantir has been used for data integration and analysis by corporate clients such as Morgan Stanley, Merck KGaA, Airbus, Wejo, Lilium, PG&E and Fiat Chrysler Automobiles.

Palantir has been criticized for its involvement in expanding government surveillance through artificial intelligence and facial recognition systems. Critics have raised concerns about its contracts with the Trump administration and the aggregation of sensitive data on Americans. Civil liberties organizations have criticized Palantir's police technology as predictive policing. CEO Alex Karp disputes this characterization. Others observe that Palantir does not collect or store data, but only helps analyze data that customers have already collected and provides services and platforms where customers retain the rights, although examples of data management failures have been noted. Some note the active or passive responsibility of Thiel and Karp in allowing conspiracy theories about Palantir to spread.

== History ==
=== 2003–2008: Founding and early years ===
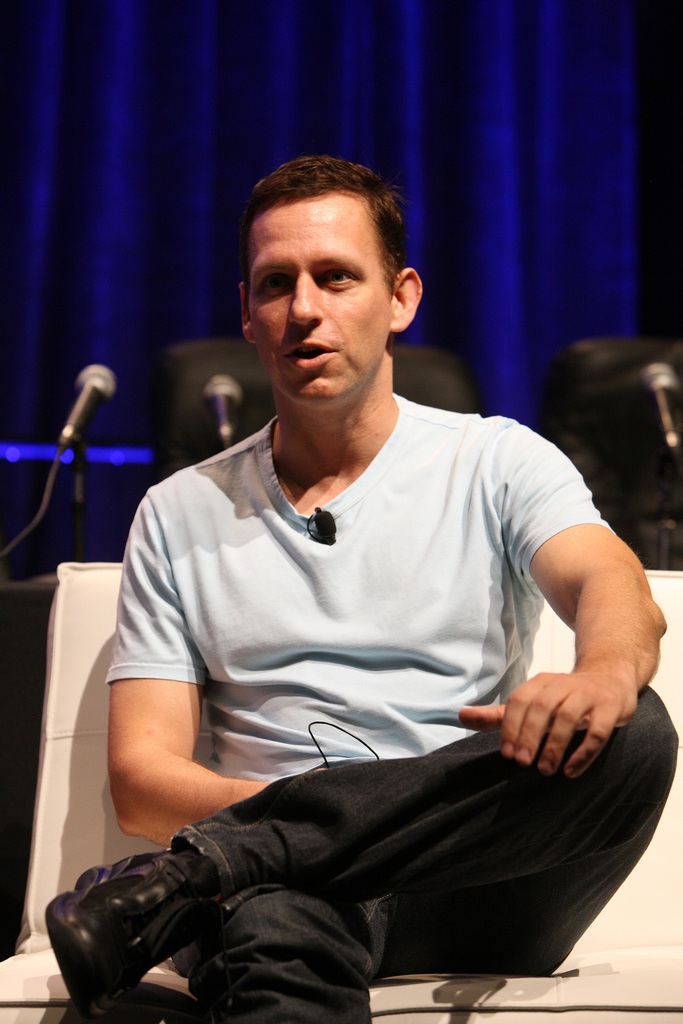
Palantir founder and chairman Peter Thiel in 2009

Palantir was founded in 2003. Thiel named the startup after the "seeing stone" in J. R. R. Tolkien's legendarium. Likewise, Palantir's office locations have names from Tolkien: The Shire (Palo Alto, California), Rivendell (McLean, Virginia), and Grey Havens (London, U.K.). In 2013, Thiel said Palantir was a "mission-oriented company" that could apply software similar to PayPal's fraud recognition systems to "reduce terrorism while preserving civil liberties". In 2004, Thiel bankrolled the creation of a prototype by PayPal engineer Nathan Gettings and Stanford University students Joe Lonsdale and Stephen Cohen. The same year, he hired Alex Karp, a former colleague of his from Stanford Law School, as chief executive officer.

There are at least four versions of the story of Palantir's founding, but they all say that Thiel and Karp produced software that others found applications for.

According to The Wall Street Journal, when Palantir launched in 2004, there were three investors other than Thiel and Karp but little interest from venture capital firms, so Thiel and his venture fund largely bankrolled the initial $30 million cost. CIA-affiliated venture capital firm In-Q-Tel invested about $2 million. According to Techcrunch, Oakhouse Partners led Palantir's $7.5 million Series A (June 2006) and REV led its $10.5 million Series B (November 2006). In its early years, Palantir maintained founder control by declining to offer board seats to investors, including In-Q-Tel. This practice continued through subsequent funding rounds.

The New Republic called Karp's formation of Palantir an embrace of techno-militarism to advance American global supremacy through hard power and targeted violence. The Wall Street Journal said Palantir had a "pro-America ethos" from its inception, highlighting a 2025 fellowship where fellows received a four-week seminar on Western civilization and whether it was worth defending.

According to the Journal, for two years the company continuously revised its technology based on the demands of analysts from the intelligence agencies, introduced to them by In-Q-Tel. A 2009 VentureBeat article said that most of the intelligence community knew about the company by word of mouth. In its early years its work included a subprime lender study for Center for Public Integrity and analyses of Somali piracy, Hezbollah, and the platform used to detect the Chinese GhostNet. Palantir said computers alone using artificial intelligence could not defeat an adaptive adversary. Instead, it proposed using human analysts to explore data from many sources, called intelligence augmentation.

=== 2010–2012: Expansion ===
In April 2010, Palantir announced a partnership with Thomson Reuters to sell the Palantir Metropolis product as "QA Studio" (a quantitative analysis tool). On June 18, 2010, Vice President of the United States Joe Biden and Office of Management and Budget Director Peter Orszag held a press conference at the White House announcing the success of fighting fraud in the stimulus by the Recovery Accountability and Transparency Board (RATB). Biden credited Palantir with supporting the Recovery Accountability and Transparency Board's fraud detection efforts, highlighting specific cases identified through the system. He announced that the capability would be deployed at other government agencies, starting with Medicare and Medicaid. Industry analysts estimated Palantir's 2011 revenues at approximately $250 million.

=== 2013–2017: Additional funding ===
"[As of 2013] the U.S. spy agencies also employed Palantir to connect databases across departments. Before this, most of the databases used by the CIA and FBI were siloed, forcing users to search each database individually. Now everything is linked together using Palantir."
— TechCrunch in January 2015

A document leaked to TechCrunch revealed that Palantir's clients as of 2013 included at least 12 groups in the U.S. government, including the CIA, the DHS, the NSA, the FBI, the CDC, the Marine Corps, the Air Force, the Special Operations Command, the United States Military Academy, the Joint Improvised-Threat Defeat Organization and Allies, the Recovery Accountability and Transparency Board and the National Center for Missing and Exploited Children. At the time, the United States Army continued to use its own data analysis tool. Also according to TechCrunch, U.S. intelligence agencies such as the CIA and FBI were linked for the first time with Palantir software, as their databases had previously been siloed.

In September 2013, Palantir disclosed over $196 million in funding, according to a U.S. Securities and Exchange Commission filing. It was estimated that the company would likely sign almost $1 billion in contracts in 2014. CEO Alex Karp announced in 2013 that the company would not pursue an IPO, as going public would make "running a company like ours very difficult". In December 2013, the company began a round of financing, raising around $450 million from private funders. This raised the company's value to $9 billion, according to Forbes, with the magazine reporting that the valuation made Palantir "among Silicon Valley's most valuable private technology companies".

In December 2014, Forbes reported that Palantir was looking to raise $400 million in an additional round of financing, after the company filed paperwork with the Securities and Exchange Commission the month before. The report was based on research by VC Experts. If completed, Forbes said Palantir's funding could reach $1.2 billion. As of December 2014, the company continued to have diverse private funders, Ken Langone and Stanley Druckenmiller, In-Q-Tel of the CIA, Tiger Global Management, and Founders Fund, a venture firm operated by Thiel.

Palantir was valued at $15 billion in November 2014. In June 2015, BuzzFeed reported the company was raising up to $500 million in new capital at a valuation of $20 billion. By December, it had raised a further $880 million, while the company was still valued at $20 billion. In February 2016, Palantir bought Kimono Labs, a startup that makes it easy to collect information from public-facing websites. In August 2016, Palantir acquired data visualization startup Silk. In 2017, BuzzFeed News reported that Palantir's footing at the CIA and especially the NSA were not stable. But according to Karp, Palantir had a firm hold at the FBI because "They'll have no choice".

=== 2018–present ===
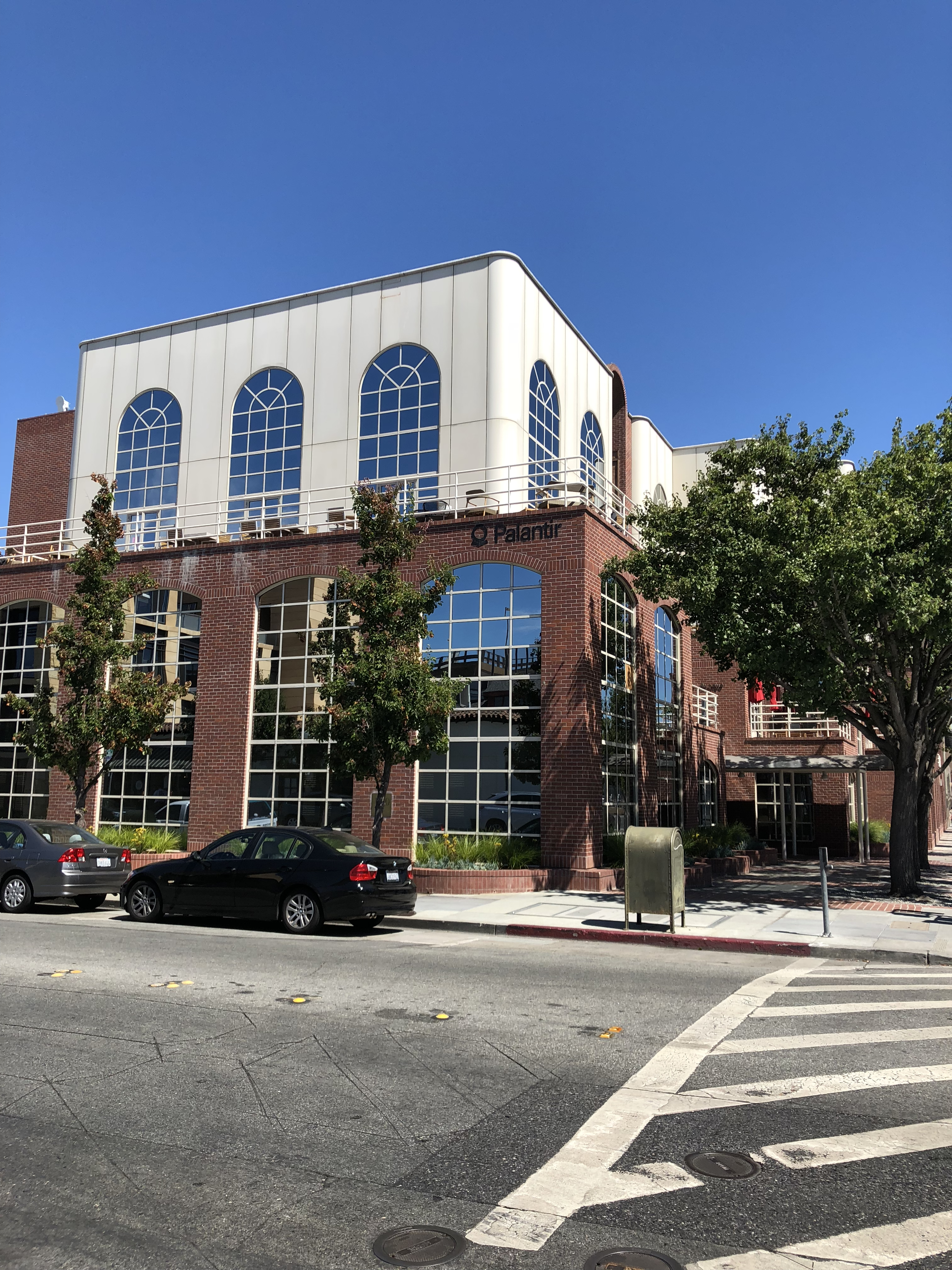
Palantir's former headquarters at Palo Alto, which remains an office

Palantir was one of four large technology firms to start working with the NHS on supporting COVID-19 efforts through the provision of software from Palantir Foundry, and by April 2020, several countries had used Palantir's technology to track contagion. Palantir also developed Tiberius, a software for vaccine allocation used in the United States.

In August 2020, Palantir Technologies moved its headquarters to Denver, Colorado, distancing itself from the "engineering elite of Silicon Valley ... they do not know more about how society should be organized or what justice requires". In September it became a publicly traded company with a direct listing on the NYSE, advertising a goal of becoming the "default operating system across the US". In December 2020, the U.S. Food and Drug Administration awarded Palantir a $44.4 million contract, boosting its shares by about 21%. In February 2023, Palantir reported its first quarter of positive GAAP net income, totaling $31 million. In November 2024, the Navy awarded Palantir a nearly $1 billion software contract. Various outlets have said that the company's actual business and size remain small.

In 2025, Fortune noted that Palantir, with a market capitalization exceeding $400 billion, ranked among the world's most valuable companies by market cap, yet would fail to meet Fortune 500 revenue thresholds (requiring $50+ billion annually in sales). The company's headcount in August 2025 was 4,100, but Karp wanted to reduce it to 3,600. As of May 2025, the second Trump administration had spent $113 million on existing and new contracts with the Department of Homeland Security and The Pentagon plus a contract of $795 million with the DOD, while deliberating contracts for the Social Security Administration and the Internal Revenue Service.

In 2025, Palantir helped fund Donald Trump's demolition of the White House East Wing and planned building of a ballroom.

In February 2026, Palantir announced plans to move its headquarters from Denver, Colorado, to Miami, Florida.

=== Valuation ===
The company was valued at $9 billion in December 2013 after raising an additional $107.5 million in funding. Forbes wrote that the valuation made Palantir "among Silicon Valley's most valuable private technology companies". Palantir's valuation rose to $15 billion after a $50 million round of funding in November 2014, and to $20 billion in late 2015 as the company closed an $880 million round of funding. In 2018, Morgan Stanley valued the company at $6 billion. On October 18, 2018, The Wall Street Journal reported that Palantir considered an IPO in the first half of 2019 following a $41 billion valuation. Before its IPO, Palantir had not made a profit. In July 2020, it filed for an IPO, and on September 30, 2020, it went public on the New York Stock Exchange through a direct public offering under the ticker symbol "PLTR".

On September 6, 2024, S&P Global announced that Palantir would be added to the S&P 500 index. Its share price rose 14% the next trading day. On November 14, Palantir announced transfer of its stock listing from the New York Stock Exchange to the Nasdaq Global Select Market effective November 26. The company's Class A Common Stock continued to trade under the symbol PLTR. In 2025, The Economist called Palantir possibly "the most over-valued firm of all time", with a market value of $430 billion—over 600 times its 2024 earnings. As of November 2025, its shares were the most expensive on the S&P 500, at 85 times expected forward annual sales.

Palantir was unprofitable for 20 years, reporting its first quarter of positive net income under non-GAAP metrics in Q4 2022 and its first quarter of positive GAAP net income in Q1 2023, totaling $31 million.

=== Investments ===
Palantir invested approximately $400 million in roughly 20 SPACs, a strategy that simultaneously positioned it as an investor in emerging companies and as a potential software provider to those portfolio companies, according to investment bank RBC Capital Markets.

== Products ==
=== Palantir Gotham ===
Released in 2008, Palantir Gotham is Palantir's defense and intelligence software. It is an evolution of Palantir's longstanding work in the United States Intelligence Community, and is used by intelligence and defense agencies. Among other things, the software supports alerts, geospatial analysis, and prediction. Foreign customers include the Ukrainian military. Palantir Gotham has also been used as a predictive policing system, which has elicited some controversy over racism in their AI analytics.

=== Palantir Foundry ===
Palantir Foundry is a software platform offered for use in commercial and civil government sectors. Foundry gained prominence in healthcare through deployment in the National COVID Cohort Collaborative, a federated network of electronic health records. Research using this platform generated extensive peer-reviewed publications and won the NIH/FASEB Dataworks Grand Prize. NHS England also used Foundry in dealing with the COVID-19 pandemic to analyze the operation of the vaccination program.

As of 2022, Foundry was also used for the administration of the UK Homes for Ukraine program to give caseworkers employed by local authorities access to data held by the Department for Levelling Up, Housing and Communities and the Home Office. In November 2023, NHS England awarded Palantir a seven-year contract valued at £330 million to design and operate a Federated Data Platform connecting patient data across England's healthcare system. The contract was immediately criticized by the British Medical Association, The Doctors' Association UK, and cybersecurity professionals, citing concerns about patient data privacy, procurement transparency, and Palantir's commercial contracts with the Israel Defense Forces. NHS England originally published the contract in December 2023 with more than 70% of its pages redacted, prompting legal action that resulted in its republication with partial disclosure. In 2024, medical professionals picketed outside NHS England HQ, demanding the deal's cancellation. As of May 2025, four US federal agencies, including the Department of Homeland Security and the Department of Health and Human Services, used Foundry.

=== Other products ===
The company has been involved in a number of business and consumer products, designing in part or in whole. For example, in 2014, it premiered Insightics, which according to The Wall Street Journal "extracts customer spending and demographic information from merchants' credit-card records". It was created in tandem with credit processing company First Data.

==== Artificial Intelligence Platform (AIP) ====
In April 2023, the company launched Artificial Intelligence Platform (AIP), which integrates large language models into privately operated networks. The company demonstrated its use in war, where a military operator could deploy operations and receive responses via an AI chatbot. Citing potential risks of generative AI, Karp said the product would not let the AI independently carry out targeting operations, but would require human oversight. Commercial companies have also used AIP across many domains. Applications include infrastructure planning, network analysis, and resource allocation.

AIP lets users create LLMs called "agents" through a graphical user interface. Agents can interact with a digital representation of a company's business known as an ontology. This lets the models access an organization's documents and other external resources. Users can define output schemas and test cases to validate AI-generated responses. AIP comes with a library of templates that can be extended by clients. Palantir also offers five-day boot camps to onboard prospective customers. Palantir hosts an annual AIPCon conference featuring demos from existing customers.

==== TITAN ====
Palantir's TITAN (Tactical Intelligence Targeting Access Node) is a mobile command vehicle equipped with AI and analytics software for military field intelligence operations. Developed with IRAD funding in partnership with Anduril Industries and Northrop Grumman, TITAN integrates intelligence and targeting data to support tactical decision-making. The company claims that TITAN can improve customers' ability to conduct long-range precision strikes. Palantir is under contract to deliver 10 units to the U.S. Army.

==== MetaConstellation ====
MetaConstellation is a satellite network that supports the deployment of AI models. Users can request information about specific locations, prompting the service to dispatch the necessary resources. MetaConstellation has been used by customers including the United States Northern Command.

==== MOSAIC ====
The AI-powered software platform MOSAIC was developed before 2015 and originally used by the International Atomic Energy Agency (IAEA) to enforce the JCPOA. It integrates over 400 million digital objects globally, such as social media feeds and satellite photographs, as well as surveillance cameras in Iran and the Middle East. This application transformed a civilian software modality into an active weapon during the Iran war, and was used to allocate human targets in Iran.

==== Skykit ====
Skykit is a portable toolbox that supports intelligence operations in adverse environments. Palantir offers "Skykit Backpack" and "Skykit Maritime" to be transported by individuals and boats respectively. Contents include battery packs, a ruggedized laptop with company software, and a quadcopter supporting computer vision applications. Skykit can also connect to the MetaConstellation satellite network. In 2023, various sources reported that the Ukrainian military had begun receiving Skykit units.

==== Palantir Metropolis ====
Palantir Metropolis (formerly known as Palantir Finance) was software for data integration, information management, and quantitative analytics. The software integrates data from commercial, proprietary, and public sources, enabling analysts to identify trends, relationships, anomalies, and predictive patterns. Aided by 120 "forward-deployed engineers" of Palantir in 2009, Peter Cavicchia III of JPMorgan used Metropolis to surveil employee communications and alert the insider threat team when an employee showed signs of potential disgruntlement: the insider alert team would further scrutinize the employee and possibly stalk them after hours with bank security personnel. The Metropolis team used emails, download activity, browser histories, and GPS locations from JPMorgan-owned smartphones and their transcripts of digitally recorded phone conversations to search, aggregate, sort, and analyze this information for specific keywords, phrases, and patterns of behavior. In 2013, Cavicchia may have shared this information with Frank Bisignano, who had become CEO of First Data Corporation. Palantir Metropolis was succeeded by Palantir Foundry.

==== ELITE ====
ELITE (Enhanced Leads Identification and Targeting for Enforcement) is a software tool Palantir developed for the US Immigration and Customs Enforcement (ICE) agency. The program provides a digital map populated with information about potential deportation targets, pulling data from the United States Department of Health and Human Services (which includes Medicaid), among other sources, to estimate the locations of the agency's targets.

== Customers ==
=== Corporate use ===
Sales by business (2024)
| Business | Sales in billion $ | Share |
|---|---|---|
| Government | 2.4 | 53.7% |
| Commercial | 2.07 | 46.3% |

Sales by region (2025)
| Region | Sales in billion $ | share |
|---|---|---|
| United Kingdom | 0.427 | 9.54% |
| United States | 3.32 | 74.4% |
| Rest of world | 0.728 | 16.27% |

Founded as a defense contractor, Palantir has since expanded to the private sector. These activities now provide a large proportion of the company's revenue. Palantir had 55% year-over-year growth in the U.S. commercial market in Q2 2024; it also serves foreign customers. Applications include telecommunications and infrastructure planning. Palantir Metropolis was used by hedge funds, banks, and financial services firms. Palantir Foundry clients include Merck KGaA, Airbus, and Ferrari. Palantir partner Information Warfare Monitor used Palantir software to uncover both the Ghostnet and the Shadow Network.

=== NATO ===
NATO acquired the Palantir Maven Smart System NATO on March 25, 2025. The system reached full technical operational capability on June 22, 2026. The initial report issued by NATO on June 30, 2026, said that it is compatible with any AI system such as the U.S.' Meta Platforms and France's Mistral AI, with integration of other systems planned. NATO commanders have reacted to the discussion on sovereignty in the EU member countries. In May 2026, Admiral Pierre Vandier, NATO's supreme allied commander transformation, said that currently there is no competitor for Palantir, and if European countries want alternatives, these alternatives should prove themselves in a few months or years, and not a decade. He advised countries to focus on control over processed data in the short term and development of infrastructure (like cloud and chips) in the long term, and not to mix these problems with dependence on single suppliers, which can be dealt with by pushing suppliers toward interoperable systems. Kai Rohrschneider, commander of Allied Joint Support and Enabling Command, criticized the distrust towards the United States and praised the Palantir software's "enormous value", noting that if member countries want to use different systems on the national level, connectivity between such systems and the programs of the NATO commands must be established.

=== United States ===
==== U.S. civil entities ====
Palantir's software was used by the Recovery Accountability and Transparency Board to detect and investigate fraud and abuse in the American Recovery and Reinvestment Act. Specifically, the Recovery Operations Center (ROC) used Palantir to integrate transactional data with open-source and private data sets to better screen the entities receiving stimulus funds. Other clients as of 2019 included Polaris Project, the Centers for Disease Control and Prevention, the National Center for Missing and Exploited Children (NCMEC), the National Institutes of Health, Team Rubicon, and the United Nations World Food Programme. NCMEC uses Palantir's software to solve cases of abduction and child abuses. NCMEC's CEO, Ernie Allen, said that Palantir offers "the ability to do the kind of link-and-pattern analysis we need to build cases, identify perpetrators, and rescue children". In October 2020, Palantir began helping the federal government set up a system to track the manufacture, distribution, and administration of COVID-19 vaccines across the country. From November 2023 to March 2026, NYC Health + Hospitals contracted with Palantir to increase revenue collection. In May 2026, the United States Department of Agriculture entered into a $3.9 million contract with Palantir to surveil employees to enforce its return-to-office policy.

==== U.S. military, intelligence, and police ====
Palantir Gotham is used by counter-terrorism analysts at offices in the United States Intelligence Community and United States Department of Defense, fraud investigators at the Recovery Accountability and Transparency Board, and cyber analysts at Information Warfare Monitor (responsible for the GhostNet and the Shadow Network investigation). Gotham was used by fraud investigators at the Recovery Accountability and Transparency Board, a former U.S. federal agency which operated from 2009 to 2015. Other clients as of 2013 included DHS, NSA, FBI, the U.S. Marine Corps, the U.S. Air Force, U.S. Special Operations Command, West Point, the Joint IED Defeat Organization, and Allies. The U.S. Army continued to use its own data analysis tool. According to TechCrunch, "The U.S. spy agencies also employed Palantir to connect databases across departments. Before this, most of the databases used by the CIA and FBI were siloed, forcing users to search each database individually. Now everything is linked together using Palantir."

U.S. military intelligence used the Palantir product to improve its ability to predict locations of improvised explosive devices in its war in Afghanistan. Field practitioners in Afghanistan reported that Palantir's analytical capabilities provided better support than the U.S. Army's Program of Record, the Distributed Common Ground System (DCGS-A), though adoption remained limited across the theater. Congressman Duncan D. Hunter complained of United States Department of Defense obstacles to its wider use in 2012. Palantir has also been reported to be working with various U.S. police departments, for example accepting a contract in 2013 to support the Northern California Regional Intelligence Center in developing a license plate reader database. Civil liberties organizations raised concerns about potential mass surveillance and privacy implications. In 2012, the New Orleans Police Department partnered with Palantir to create a predictive policing program.

In 2014, U.S. Immigration and Customs Enforcement (ICE) awarded Palantir a $41 million contract to build and maintain a new intelligence system called Investigative Case Management (ICM) to track personal and criminal records of legal and illegal immigrants. This application was originally conceived by ICE's office of Homeland Security Investigations (HSI), allowing its users access to other federal and private law enforcement entities' intelligence platforms. The system reached its "final operation capacity" under the Trump administration in September 2017. In 2021, ICE announced that it would terminate its contract with Palantir as it was developing its own technology. But a year later, as replacement proved unsuccessful, ICE reversed that decision.

Palantir took over the Pentagon's Project Maven contract in 2019 after Google decided not to continue developing AI unmanned drones used for bombings and intelligence. In 2024, Palantir emerged as a "Trump trade" for further enforcing the law on illegal immigrants and profiting on federal spending for national security and immigration. Palantir has a $30 million contract with ICE to track the movement of migrants. The Department of Government Efficiency asked Palantir to help it speed up deportation by creating a master database. On July 31, 2025, the U.S. Army awarded Palantir an "Enterprise Service Agreement" valued at up to $10 billion over 10 years. This contract vehicle consolidates 75 previously separate data and software contracts (in 15 of which Palantir is the prime contractor and in 60 of which it is a subcontractor) into a single software contract, streamlining the Army's procurement of Palantir's AI, data integration, and analytics tools.

=== United Kingdom ===
In 2014, The New York Times reported that Palantir was working with the British government, leading to a debate within the company due to British press laws. The Nerve reports that Palantir's known contracts with the UK government date back to 2012, and that some work without released dates might be earlier, while most are post-2018 contracts. Palantir's work spanned 10 departments, with contract values totaling at least £670m between 2012 and 2025. Most revenue comes from the Ministry of Defense and the National Health Service.

==== Financial Conduct Authority ====
In March 2026, the Financial Conduct Authority (FCA), the United Kingdom's primary financial regulatory body, awarded Palantir a contract to investigate its highly sensitive regulation data. The Guardian reported that Palantir beat one unnamed competitor to win the contract. The deal has raised serious concerns inside and outside the FCA, as it gives Palantir access to data including whole email accounts, phone calls, aggregated social media posts, and full financial records.

==== NHS England ====
Palantir has contracts relating to patient data from England's National Health Service. In 2020, it was awarded an emergency non-competitive contract to mine COVID-19 patient data and consolidate government databases to help ministers and officials respond to the pandemic. The contract was valued at more than £23.5 million and extended for two more years. The awarding of the contract without competition was heavily criticised, prompting the NHS to pledge an open and transparent procurement process for any future data contract. Liam Fox encouraged the firm "to expand their software business" in Britain. It was said to be "critical to the success of the vaccination and PPE programmes", but its involvement with the NHS was controversial among civil liberties groups. Conservative MP David Davis called for a judicial review into the sharing of patient data with Palantir.

The procurement of a £480m Federated Data Platform by NHS England, launched in January 2023, has been called a "must win" for Palantir. The procurement has been called a "farce" by civil liberties campaigners who allege that Palantir has a competitive advantage as it "already has its feet under the table in NHS England" and benefits from a short procurement window. In April 2023 it was revealed that a consortium of UK companies had unsuccessfully bid for the contract. In April 2023, Davis publicly expressed his concern over the procurement process, saying it could become a "battle royale". He was one of a dozen MPs pressing the government over privacy concerns with the use of data. Labour peer and former Health Minister Philip Hunt voiced his concern about Palantir's use of data, saying, "The current NHS and current government doesn't have a good track record of getting the details right, and the procurement shows no sign of going better."

Also in April 2023, The Guardian reported that 11 NHS trusts had suspended use of Palantir Foundry software pending resolution of technical implementation issues, according to a Department of Health and Social Care spokesperson. In March 2023, it was revealed that NHS hospitals had been ordered to share patient data with Palantir, prompting renewed criticism from civil liberties groups, including for supporting genocide, privacy and security practices, and "buying their way in". Groups including the Doctors' Association UK, National Pensioners' Convention, and Just Treatment subsequently threatened legal action over NHS England's procurement of the FDP contract, citing concerns over the use of patient data.

In 2022, Palantir recruited NHS England's former artificial intelligence chief, Indra Joshi. It said it was planning to increase its team in the UK by 250. Palantir's UK head, Louis Mosley, grandson of the former British Union of Fascists leader Oswald Mosley, was quoted internally as saying that Palantir's strategy for entry into the British health industry was to "Buy our way in" by acquiring smaller rival companies with existing relationships with the NHS to "take a lot of ground and take down a lot of political resistance". In November 2023, NHS England awarded Palantir a £330 million contract to create and manage the Federated Data Platform. In April 2024, medical professionals picketed at NHS England headquarters, demanding that it end its contract with Palantir over contracts with the IDF.

In September 2026 NHS Cheshire and Merseyside revealed that data from 5 GP practices had been shared into their local Federated Data Platform.

At least 20 NHS trusts in England had stopped using Palantir's waiting list tools by October 2026.

==== Ministry of Defence ====
Palantir has held contracts with the United Kingdom Ministry of Defence (MoD) relating to data analytics capabilities supporting strategic, tactical, and live decision-making.

In December 2022, Palantir was awarded a £75 million Enterprise Agreement to provide its software toolset to meet the UK MoD's requirements across all security classifications for a three-year period, aligned with defence data strategies.

On 30 December 2025, the Ministry of Defence awarded Palantir a further £240.6 million contract to support data analytics capabilities enabling critical strategic, tactical, and live decision-making across defence operations, including interoperability with NATO systems. This contract was a direct award, meaning no other companies were considered during the procurement process. The reasons given for this exception were that switching supplier (Palantir were awarded a previous contract) would cause technical difficulties, and that no other supplier could provide a similar service. The contract runs from 1 April 2026 to 31 March 2029.

The 2025 contract attracted political scrutiny, with critics raising concerns about transparency surrounding meetings between UK political figures and representatives of the company.

==== Metropolitan police ====
In February 2026, it was revealed that Scotland Yard was using AI tools supplied by Palantir to profile its officers, specifically to look at their illness levels, absences from duty and overtime patterns. Responding to FOI requests, the Metropolitan police refused to confirm or deny whether it had used Palantir's technology since 2021 but confirmed it had not used any between November 2019 and July 2021. Palantir is included as one of 29 possible suppliers for the Metropolitan police and the Mayor's Office for Policing and Crime between 3 December 2025 and 2 December 2030 as part of its "Precise Policing 2" dynamic market.

In May 2026, Mayor of London Sadiq Khan blocked a contract between Palantir and the Metropolitan Police worth up to £50 million. The Mayor's Office for Policing and Crime (MOPAC) cited concerns with Palantir's ethics and that the Metropolitan Police had failed to demonstrate sufficient value for money.

In October 2026, Palantir and MOPAC settled their legal dispute and withdrew their allegations against each other without an admission of liability or payment of damages. In a joint statement, MOPAC said its decision had been based on procurement rules, governance, affordability and value for money, rather than Palantir's ethics or reputation. The proposed contract was to be put out to a new procurement process, in which Palantir would be eligible to participate.

==== Territorial Police Forces ====
In November 2025, Bedfordshire police used Palantir tools to convict "Fuck the Police", a criminal gang suspected of stealing £800,000 from UK cash points in more than 3,000 withdrawals. Bedfordshire police seized the suspects' smartphones and used Palantir's Nectar to read and translate over 100,000 text messages from Romanian to English. Nectar analyzed their movements, combining images and text to suggest possible crimes, and created charts of connections among those investigated.

The East Midlands Special Operations Unit, made up of the Derbyshire, Leicestershire, Lincolnshire, Northamptonshire and Nottinghamshire police forces, started a project with Palantir's Foundry software in 2024 but discontinued it in 2026. Lancashire Police has a contract with the company it is not planning to renew. Hertfordshire Police also has a contract with the company.

=== Europol ===
Europol has used the Gotham system.

=== Denmark ===
The Danish POL-INTEL predictive policing project has been operational since 2017 and is based on the Gotham system. According to the AP, the Danish system "uses a mapping system to build a so-called heat map identifying areas with higher crime rates." In 2025, when the Danish government was integrating Palantir into the country's military, police and intelligence services, a major argument made by opponents was that the Praxis project (backed by Thiel through Pronomos) threatened Greenland. Other arguments were concerned with Thiel's politics in the U.S., Palantir's association with U.S. and other European intelligence services (Jacob Kaarsbo, a former chief analyst at Danish Defence Intelligence Service, could not name these intelligence services for reasons of confidentiality), and the security risk posed by giving Palantir citizens' data. The Danish National Police answered with a reference to a 2021 response to the Folketing, but otherwise, the Police, the Danish Security and Intelligence Service, and Minister of Justice Peter Hummelgaard refused to comment on the matter. In June 2026, Denmark granted Palantir access to the police force in Greenland.

=== Norway ===
Norwegian Customs uses Palantir Gotham to screen passengers and vehicles for control. Known inputs are prefiled freight documents, passenger lists, the national Currency Exchange database (tracks all cross-border currency exchanges), the Norwegian Labour and Welfare Administrations employer- and employee-registry, the Norwegian stock holder registry and 30 public databases from InfoTorg. InfoTorg provides access to more than 30 databases, including the Norwegian National Citizen registry, European Business Register, the Norwegian DMV vehicle registry, various credit databases etc. These databases are supplemented by the Norwegian Customs Departments own intelligence reports, including results of previous controls. The system is also augmented by data from public sources such as social media.

=== Germany ===
In 2023, German interior minister Nancy Faeser stopped the federal use of Palantir. As of July 2025, German police departments in three of its 16 states—Bavaria, Hesse, and Nordrhein-Westfalen—have used Palantir for data mining. In March, Baden-Württemberg entered a $25 million contract without a legal basis to use the software. In May 2026, the Bundeswehr leadership said that, for the moment, they would not give Palantir contracts on the national level, preferring a German or European company. Inspector of cyber and information space Thomas Daum said that the Bundeswehr is already working with Palantir on the NATO level, where Palantir not only provides the software but operates it, and while this operating model is efficient, it is "currently inconceivable" to hand over access to the national database to the industry's side, and the Bundeswehr wants to handle the operation of the software by the military side's personnel.

=== France ===
In France, after the November 2015 Paris attacks, the Directorate-General for Internal Security signed a contract with Palantir, which was extended in 2019. President Emmanuel Macron said Palantir would retain its role in the French intelligence sector until the end of his term in office, but a replacement program was launched in May 2017. In June 2026, after the US government suddenly cut off access to Anthropic's newest models, it was announced that France's General Directorate for Internal Security would replace Palantir with ChapsVision, a local alternative, with prime minister Sébastien Lecornu saying the government was worried about strategic dependence.

=== Ukraine ===
Mykhailo Fedorov, then Deputy Prime Minister and Minister of Digital Transformation, said that Karp was the first CEO to visit Kyiv after the 2022 Russian invasion. Ukraine uses Palantir for military purposes such as air defense, mining warfare, logistics, as well as management of the wartime economy, education system, refugees, and reconstruction activities, including organization of electronic services and demining.

Gotham uses data from drone videos, intercepted communications, satellite imagery, and civilian tips (using apps such as the Ukrainian "E-Enemy") to produce complete battlefield pictures that help commanders choose targets, thereby shortening the "kill chain". The Meta Constellation tool is used to organize satellite swarms while PRISMA is used to coordinate drone strikes. Other platforms Ukraine uses include AIP, Foundry, and a form of Maven. According to a December 2022 report by The Times, Palantir's AI has allowed Ukraine to increase its artillery strikes' accuracy, speed, and deadliness. The Prosecutor General of Ukraine also plans to use Palantir's software to help document alleged Russian war crimes. Palantir's software is used at command centers with strong internet connections, complementing Ukraine's Delta, which serves offline situations (Militarnyi links Palantir to Delta's development, but the details are not specified). Together with Ukraine's Ministry of Defense, Palantir organizes the Brave1 Dataroom, where 100 companies use real battlefield data to train more than 80 AI models. It is generally recognized that Palantir provides essential wartime capabilities for Ukraine; Zelenskyy has called the relationship between Ukraine and Palantir "mutually beneficial". Commentators also remark that these benefits (InDepthNews dubs the relationship "software-based guarantee") come with strategic dependency for the Ukraine side. In June 2026, analyst Markus Reisner said that Ukraine had gained the upper hand in its war with Russia through the use of Palantir. Reisner said Ukraine had become a laboratory for Palantir to test and develop AI capabilities, with implications for the US's effort to prevent a war in Taiwan.

=== Netherlands ===
In 2025, Dutch Justice Minister David van Weel publicly confirmed that Dutch police departments had used Palantir software since 2011, a use that had remained largely undisclosed. Over the subsequent decade, researchers seeking government transparency were repeatedly denied, with documents finally released only after litigation but with 99% of content redacted. They show that many contracts with Palantir were signed.

=== Israel ===
In 2014, The New York Times reported that Palantir had contracts with the Israeli government, leading to disagreement with some of its employees who criticized Israel's policies towards Palestinians.

In January 2024, Palantir agreed to a strategic partnership with the IDF under which it would provide the IDF with services to assist its "war-related missions". Karp has been emphatic in his public support for Israel. He has frequently criticized what he calls the inaction of other tech leaders. His position has prompted several employees to leave Palantir. Palantir says it plays no role in developing the AI-based systems (including "Gospel" and "Lavender") the Israeli military uses for target identification.

=== Switzerland ===
In late 2025, the left-leaning Swiss publication Republik revealed internal reports by the Swiss federal government that Switzerland had been courted as a client of Palantir since 2018. Palantir has offices in Zurich and Bern, and the Swiss Defence Department through Armasuisse was initially interested in buying Palantir's information systems, but larger deals with the Swiss government were rejected out of concern that data could be released to U.S. intelligence agencies. The publication also mentioned a possible reputational risk if Switzerland had adopted such surveillance software. Later it was made public that Palantir attempted to sue Republik for not having the right to reply to the allegations.

=== Spain ===
In July 2026, it was reported that the Spanish government has been directing government agencies and companies with stakes controlled by the sovereign wealth fund SEPI to avoid Palantir. A prospective contract with the company Navantia was reportedly blocked after the government interfered. Despite this, Palantir was awarded a contract with the Armed Forces Intelligence Center in 2023, and military commanders have reportedly defended the relationship with the company.

=== Italy ===
According to a July 2026 report by Turkey's Clash report, the government of Italy has been increasingly skeptical of a relationship with Palantir, and Palantir's only confirmed government contract in Italy is a minor, open-source data integration contract with the ministry of defense. A 2026 report by The good lobby notes that there is little transparency on the matter, but government documents show the existence of a series of contracts since 2015. The ministry of defense refused to answer questions about a 2024 initiative on "supply of the Palantir Gotham license", saying the information was classified.

=== Canada ===
The military forces started a contract with Palantir in 2020. 2025 documents showed that the contract's value has increased over the years. According to Public Services and Procurement Canada, 18 Palantir employees have received security clearance and access to sensitive data under Contract Security Program since March 28, 2019. Cyber analysts at Information Warfare Monitor, a Canadian public-private venture that operated from 2003 to 2012, used Palantir Gotham.

=== Ecuador ===
Ecuador's National Customs Service (SENAE) signed a contract with Palantir in May 2025, targeting drug trafficking and smuggling.

=== Brazil ===
While the federal government's Transparency Portal does not show any contract with Palantir, in 2024, the National Fund for the Development of Education mentioned a "success story that modernized the transfer of public funds from the agency to the federated entities", which an executive of Palantir Brazil confirmed. After a September 2025 meeting of members of the Special Committee on Artificial Intelligence of the Chamber of Deputies and Palantir in the US, federal deputy Rui Falcão asked the ministries of management and education to clarify which public bodies use Palantir's software, but got no answer.

=== Australia ===
The Australian Defence Force has been using Palantir since 2011. In February 2026, the Cyber and Electronic Warfare Division signed a contract that secured local military use of Palantir's ICT System Platform.

=== Other ===
The International Atomic Energy Agency (IAEA) used Palantir to verify whether Iran was in compliance with the 2015 agreement.

== Partnerships with corporations ==
=== United States ===
Palantir's partnership with Anduril Industries extends to many areas. In later 2024, there were reportedly building and leading a consortium with another dozen contractors, including SpaceX, OpenAI, and Saronic, to challenge the domination of the traditional "primes". They also partner with EVTOL company Archer Aviation. Alongside 8VC and General Catalyst, Palantir also helped create and is a member of the New American Industrial Alliance. The other members are other defense contractors and hardtech companies, such as Anduril, Andreessen Horowitz, Hadrian, Oklo Inc., Narya Capital, Booz Allen, Joby Aviation, Regent Craft, Atomic Industries, Impulse Space, and Dirac, which hope to reduce government regulations.

Palantir, TWG Global, and xAI have a joint venture. Palantir collaborates with Anthropic and Amazon Web Services to provide Anthropic's Claude AI models to U.S. intelligence and defense agencies. It also partners with the traditional defense "primes": Boeing (specifically its defense and space unit), Lockheed Martin, Northrop Grumman (TITAN system), and General Dynamics (through General Dynamics Land System).

Palantir is known to disrupt the traditional consulting business model. It also partners with traditional companies (and rivals in government contract) such as Deloitte, Booz Allen, and Accenture. On February 8, 2021, Palantir and IBM announced a partnership that would use IBM's hybrid cloud data platform alongside Palantir's operations platform for building applications. The product, Palantir for IBM Cloud Pak for Data, was expected to simplify the process of building and deploying AI-integrated applications with IBM Watson. On March 5, 2021, Palantir announced its partnership with Amazon AWS. Palantir's ERP Suite was optimized to run on Amazon Web Services. BP used the ERP suite. On August 8, 2024, Palantir and Microsoft announced a partnership whereby Palantir will deploy its suite of products on Microsoft Azure Government clouds.

=== Korea ===
In Korea, Palantir has strategic relationships with HD Hyundai and KT. It has a data alliance with HD Hyundai and partners with HD Hyundai and Siemens to automate shipbuilding for both Korea and the U.S. KT cooperates with Palantir to scale Foundry and AIP across Korean industries. In 2025, Samsung partnered with Palantir to increase the yield and quality of its chips.

=== Germany ===
SAP has strategic partnerships with Palantir and Perplexity, aiming to enhance SAP's business AI offerings. Palantir also partners with SAP's U.S.-based branch, SAP National Security Services, to offer AI systems to the U.S. public sector. Palantir has a partnership with Axel Springer SE, a publisher known to have a close relationship with Karp, who sat on its board, and Thiel, who employed Springer's Mathias Döpfner's son Moritz as his chief of staff and business associate. Some German media outlets have speculated about Thiel's political influence in Germany through his relationships with media executives and his investment in emerging political figures. Palantir partners with Merck KGaA through joint ventures Syntrophy, which focuses on cancer data analytics, and Athinia, which focuses on the semiconductor sector. Palantir is strategic partners with Helsing. Espreso TV has linked the unusual number of defense CEOs (Brian Schimpf of Anduril Industries, Gundbert Scherf of Helsing, and Karp) at the 2025 Bilderberg Conference to Thiel's influence.

=== United Arab Emirates ===
On November 4, 2025, a joint venture between Palantir and Dubai Holding, the Dubai government's investment arm, was announced. The New Arab noted that the partnership came just a day after Microsoft revealed plans to invest $15.2 billion in AI and cloud computing projects across the UAE.

== Controversies and conspiracy theories ==
Palantir has been criticized for its role in expanding government surveillance using artificial intelligence and facial recognition software. Some former employees and outside observers have also criticized the company's contracts under the second Trump Administration, which enable deportations and the aggregation of sensitive data on Americans across administrative agencies.

Wired wrote that some people think Palantir "maintains a giant, centralized database of information collected from all of its clients", which is untrue. The company's work does not affect how each organization collects its data but helps organizations "integrate and analyze data without needing to fix the underlying architecture", effectively functioning like "a technical band-aid". Palantir's customers "need to already have the data they want to work with—Palantir itself does not provide any". Citing a former Palantir employee, Wired reported that the government can rely on Gotham to "centralize everything an agency knows about a person in one place".

Others observe that Palantir does not collect or store data, but only helps analyze data that customers have already collected and provides services and platforms where customers retain the rights; still, it is generally accepted that abuses by governments and data management failures can happen. Michael Steinberger told Politico, "they [Palantir] do not collect data, they do not store data, and they definitely don't sell data." But the end users, such as companies and governments, can determine "how rigorously or not to use safety controls built into the platform", and this creates risks.

The researchers Andrew Iliadis and Amelia Acker wrote, "lines of critique concerning hypothetical data sourcing can be defended", but Palantir "remains open to the critique of potentially being an accessory to acts of deportation, imprisonment, and racism through its contracts". They also wrote that Palantir is in contact with sensitive data through its forward-deployed software engineers, and that the clients use Palantir's platform to track and collect data, as shown in Palantir's patents.

Incidents of data leaks or mismanagement have been noted, including the 2015 data leak in which Techcrunch received documents that revealed the tools Palantir used and a list of key customers; the 2021 software misconfiguration that allowed some FBI employees unwarranted access; and the 2025 lawsuit Palantir filed against former employees Radha Jain and Joanna Cohen for stealing data to launch a "copycat" company with the help of General Catalyst (the two had been entrusted with the source code and Cohen was noted to have interacted with Palantir's important customers). In December 2025, Palantir expanded its lawsuit to include the CEO of Percepta AI.

In May 2025, The New York Times wrote an article with the headline "Trump Taps Palantir to Compile Data on Americans". According to the article, an order Trump signed in March 2025, which called "for the federal government to share data across agencies", raised "questions over whether he might compile a master list of personal information on Americans that could give him untold surveillance power", and Palantir was involved with the effort. Palantir called the article "blatantly untrue". Snopes wrote that Palantir's tools are powerful enough for DOGE to construct such databases easily and that the Trump administration and Musk did issue statements about data consolidation, but that Palantir does not collect or store data and would not be the entity that centralizes data, which should be the work of the government. Additionally, citing an SSA source interviewed by Wired, Snopes said that building a connected network of databases and computers for DOGE would be "more feasible and quicker than putting all the data in a single place, which is probably what they really want."

Some commentators have said that many conspiracy theories about Palantir have arisen, partly due to the CIA's early involvement and Palantir's initial focus on intelligence contracts, but also partly because the founders, including Thiel and Karp, deliberately crafted an image that exaggerated Palantir's relationship with the CIA or its capacity during its early phase. In 2017, Fortune wrote, "rumors and conspiracy theories have swirled around Palantir." Among these, Fortune named the finding of Osama bin Laden, the national security mystique (the company was already being used for various mundane tasks ranging "from fraud detection to supermarket-shelf positioning, and by governments and nonprofits for everything from coordinating disaster relief to identifying human traffickers"), and the impression that Palantir was an "insider" because of the connection between Thiel and Trump and thus that its suit against the Army was just a power play—according to Fortune, the suit began before it was conceivable to predict that Trump would win the presidency, and the people more likely to influence the relationship between Palantir and the military were Generals Michael Flynn, H. R. McMaster, and James Mattis, who all supported Palantir.

It was reported that Palantir's technological phalanx was crucial in finding Osama bin Laden in 2011. But according to Anthony King, an expert on war studies who has worked with Royal Marine and NATO, the story was at best an exaggeration. King notes that this story about Bin Laden as well as the connection with the Total Information Awareness program were propaganda Thiel used to consolidate the small foothold Palantir had in the defense forces by 2011. In 2021, The New Republic wrote that even when Bloomberg ran an article (with the headline "PALANTIR KNOWS EVERYTHING ABOUT YOU" (2018)) that exaggerated the privacy concerns, Palantir's leaders did nothing, because the story helped raise Palantir's valuation, which reached $40 billion by January 2021.

On the other hand, there were occasions when Palantir's capabilities were underestimated due to non-technical factors like culture clash. In 2012, the Army Test and Evaluation Command (ATEC) produced a positive report about Palantir and recommended the Army install its system but was ordered to modify this report due to sensitivities "about purchased systems in use that came outside the normal acquisitions process". In 2013, the U.S. Army canceled an independent MITRE evaluation that was also mostly positive and found Palantir software to be interoperable with other systems such as DCGS-A. The Pentagon subsequently presented Congress with reports from the Army's acquisition office that contradicted these findings. Fortune notes that the mutual distrust came from differences in working cultures and that Palantir approached the Pentagon with the attitude that the Pentagon was incompetent in developing data platforms. In 2016, Palantir won a lawsuit against the Army for discriminating against its commercial solution in favor of DCGS-A, which was more expensive and risk-prone. The Army appealed in 2017, but the matter was settled after Palantir defeated Raytheon in a head-to-head competition and Palantir won the contract in 2019.

BuzzFeed News reported in 2017 that despite the reputation that connected Palantir to U.S. intelligence agencies (an impression Palantir created in order to win business), including the CIA, NSA, and FBI, the actual relationship was rocky for various reasons, with episodes of friction and recalcitrance. The NSA in particular had been resistant because it had plenty of its own talent and focused more on SIGINT while Palantir's software worked better for HUMINT. Meanwhile, the CIA had been so frustrated by the publicity associating Palantir with it that it tried to cancel the Palantir contract.

=== Algorithm development ===
i2 Inc sued Palantir in Federal Court, alleging fraud, conspiracy, and copyright infringement over Palantir's algorithm. Shyam Sankar, Palantir's then-director of business development, used a private eye company known as the cutout for obtaining i2's code. i2 settled out of court for $10 million in 2011.

=== WikiLeaks proposals (2010) ===
In 2010, Hunton & Williams LLP allegedly asked Berico Technologies, Palantir, and HBGary Federal to draft a response plan to "the WikiLeaks Threat". In early 2011 Anonymous publicly released HBGary-internal documents, including the plan. The plan proposed that Palantir software would "serve as the foundation for all the data collection, integration, analysis, and production efforts". The plan also included slides, allegedly authored by HBGary CEO Aaron Barr, which suggested "[spreading] disinformation" and "disrupting" Glenn Greenwald's support for WikiLeaks. Palantir CEO Alex Karp ended all ties to HBGary and issued a statement apologizing to "progressive organizations ... and Greenwald ... for any involvement that we may have had in these matters". Palantir placed an employee on leave pending a review by a third-party law firm. The employee was later reinstated.

=== Racial discrimination lawsuit (2016) ===
On September 26, 2016, the Office of Federal Contract Compliance Programs of the U.S. Department of Labor filed a lawsuit against Palantir alleging that the company discriminated against Asian job applicants on the basis of their race. According to the lawsuit, the company "routinely eliminated" Asian applicants during the hiring process, even when they were "as qualified as white applicants" for the same jobs. Palantir settled the suit in April 2017 for $1.7 million while not admitting wrongdoing.

=== UK ===
During questioning in front of the Digital, Culture, Media and Sport Select Committee, Christopher Wylie, the former research director of Cambridge Analytica, said that Palantir and Cambridge Analytica had had several meetings and that SCL chief executive Alexander Nix had facilitated its use of Aleksandr Kogan's data, which had been obtained from his app "thisisyourdigitallife" by mining personal surveys. Kogan later established Global Science Research to share the data with Cambridge Analytica and others. Wylie confirmed that employees from both Cambridge Analytica and Palantir used Kogan's Global Science Research and harvested Facebook data together in the same offices. Palantir said it had contact with Cambridge Analytica but decided not to move forward with a relationship. Palantir also said that it discovered only in March 2018 that one of its employees, Alfredas Chmieliauskas, had worked with Cambridge Analytica in a personal capacity. When shown proof of Chmieliauskas's activities, the company retracted its denial and issued a press release saying that Chmieliauskas had "engaged in an entirely personal capacity".

Testifying before British lawmakers the same day The Times published its story about Palantir and CA, Wylie said that "senior Palantir employees" had also been involved with CA: "Palantir staff would come into the [CA] office and work on the data". In an interview with The Times, Wylie said that he and Nix had visited Palantir's London office. The New York Times wrote, "emails reviewed by The Times indicate that Mr. Nix and Mr. Chmieliauskas sought to revive talks about a formal partnership through early 2014, but Palantir executives again declined." Wylie admitted that Palantir and Cambridge Analytica signed no contract and had no formal relationship. The New York Times also wrote that Wylie did not identify or specify the number of Palantir employees that he mentioned. In June 2021, reacting to the NHS's use of Foundry, the tech-justice nonprofit Foxglove began a campaign against Palantir because "Their background has generally been in contracts where people are harmed, not healed." Supporting the campaign, Clive Lewis MP said Palantir had an "appalling track record". Palantir UK is headed by Louis Mosley, grandson of British fascist leader Oswald Mosley.

Palantir UK came under scrutiny after allegations about former British Labour politician and Ambassador to the United States Peter Mandelson. In 2026, The Chartered Institute of Public Relations (CIPR) called for the immediate release of fully transparent information relating to Mandelson's lobbying firm, Global Counsel, and its role in securing government contracts for Palantir, warning that the current lobbying system is "failing the public".

=== ICE partnership (since 2014) ===
Palantir has come under criticism due to its partnership developing software for U.S. Immigration and Customs Enforcement (ICE). In a statement provided to The New York Times, the firm implied that because its contract was with HSI, a division of ICE focused on investigating criminal activities, it played no role in deportations. In 2017, The Intercept obtained documents that disprove this claim and show that ICE considers Palantir's ICM software "mission critical". The documents obtained by The Intercept and Mijente, an immigration advocacy group, show that in 2017 HSI and ERO undertook a joint operation using the ICM database to arrest and possibly deport family members of undocumented children caught trying to cross the border. In August 2019, when HSI, deploying FALCON, led a raid on food-processing plants in Mississippi, nearly 700 people were arrested. In an interview with CNBC a few months later, Karp acknowledged that Palantir's blanket denials had been misleading. But in 2019, he renewed Palantir's contract with ICE for $50 million over three years. Other groups critical of Palantir include the Brennan Center for Justice, National Immigration Project, the Immigrant Defense Project, the Tech Workers Coalition, and Mijente. In one internal ICE report Mijente acquired, Palantir's software was said to have been critical in an operation to arrest the parents of children residing illegally. In September 2020, Amnesty International released a report criticizing Palantir's failure to conduct human rights due diligence for its contracts with ICE. Palantir's human rights record has been scrutinized for contributing to human rights violations of asylum-seekers and migrants. In April 2025, Palantir signed a new $30 million contract with ICE to provide software for a new platform called ImmigrationOS, which would expedite deportations.

==== Immigration Lifecycle Operating System (Immigration OS) ====
In April 2025, Palantir was reported to be working closely with ICE to enable deportation in the second presidency of Donald Trump. ICE reportedly paid Palantir $30 million to develop the Immigration Lifecycle Operating System (Immigration OS). The Washington Post reported that Palantir developed the software to track undocumented immigrants with the goal of deporting them faster. The Immigration OS project was renewed in September 2025, despite facing some Palantir employees questioning whether "the contract should be discontinued if ICE's use of the technology veers into extrajudicial actions or violate the company's civil liberties principles". In an October 2025 interview with The New York Times, Palantir chief technology officer Shyam Sankar said that Immigration OS "tracked encounters at the border, asylum applications and applications for benefits". According to Palantir, Immigration OS "does not track information of U.S. citizens who are relatives of undocumented immigrants".

The Immigration OS project has also been criticized by Y Combinator co-founder Paul Graham, who wrote that Palantir is "building the infrastructure of the police state". Palantir's continued affiliation with ICE coincided with the changes to its employee code of conduct that were made in response to executive orders by President Trump forbidding federal contractors from diversity practices. In 2022, DHS awarded Palantir $139.3 million for "investigative case management operations, maintenance support services and custom enhancements"; the contract is ongoing as of January 2026.

=== "HHS Protect Now" and privacy concerns (2020) ===
The COVID-19 pandemic prompted tech companies to respond to growing demand for citizen information from governments in order to conduct contact tracing and to analyze patient data. Consequently, data collection companies such as Palantir had been contracted to partake in pandemic data collection practices. Palantir's participation in "HHS Protect Now", a program launched by the United States Department of Health and Human Services to track the spread of the coronavirus, attracted criticism from US lawmakers.

Palantir's participation in COVID-19 response projects reignited debates over its involvement in tracking illegal immigrants, especially its alleged effects on digital inequality and restrictions on online freedoms. Critics allege that confidential data acquired by HHS could be exploited by other federal agencies in unregulated and potentially harmful ways. Alternative proposals request greater transparency in the process to determine whether any of the data aggregated would be shared with the US Immigration and Customs Enforcement to single out illegal immigrants.

=== Second Trump administration (2025) ===
According to required financial disclosures, Stephen Miller, who as United States homeland security advisor has been actively involved in the second Trump administration's deportation efforts, owns between $100,000 and $250,000 of Palantir stock; some Trump critics have raised concerns about a potential conflict of interest. Similar financial disclosure requirements of U.S. government employees show that at least 10 other members of the Trump administration own Palantir stock. Advocacy groups such as the Alliance for Secure AI have also criticized Palantir's use of AI during the second Trump administration.

In February 2025, The New York Times reported that Trump and Palantir were compiling a master list of personal information on every American that could give Trump "untold surveillance power" by illegally combining information from various government departments.

In December 2025, it was reported that Palantir had begun to develop a portal for the Department of Education allowing universities to report foreign donations. The company is acting as a subcontractor of Monkton, a computer and network security company, which won a $9.8 million contract to design, develop, and deploy a "Section 117 Information Sharing Environment Capable of Providing Greater Transparency".

=== German police software (2020s) ===
There is considerable controversy about the use of Palantir by the state and the Federal Ministry of Interior's ongoing attempt to introduce it at the federal level. The controversy also elicits debate from neighboring countries, with De Tijd noting that even when a German court ruled the software unconstitutional in 2023, it was not abandoned, and the law was changed.

The controversy also touches on Thiel's and Karp's German origins and alleged relationships with powerful political and economic actors in Germany (especially in the wealthier, more powerful states, such as Bavaria, Baden-Württemberg, North Rhine-Westphalia, and Hesse). Hesse is Thiel's home state (he was born in Frankfurt), and Karp completed his PhD there. Hesse was the first federal state to introduce Palantir software (as Hessendata, since 2017) while Bavaria promotes its VeRA version at the federal level. Bavaria Minister of the Interior Joachim Herrmann has said that VeRA must be used nationwide to "create a uniform and effective security infrastructure".

There is also debate about the founders' application of the philosophy of René Girard, Nietzsche, Carl Schmitt, and the Frankfurt School at Palantir and in the surveillance industry. According to a 2025 documentary produced by Hessischer Rundfunk, Karp, like Thiel, seeks world domination. Franz-Josef Hanke, a spokesperson for the Humanist Union in Hesse, has also said that this is Thiel's goal with Palantir.

The German version of Jacobin has written that while Palantir does not steal data or carry out surveillance activity, its increased power in Germany is still worrisome, considering the founders' non-democratic tendencies, and that SPD and Alliance 90/The Greens also carry responsibility. The European has written that Thiel and Karp cause themselves trouble by trying to create a mysterious aura, which leads to a negative reaction to Palantir software despite its usefulness in civilian and defense applications.

According to an August 2025 Süddeutsche Zeitung article, a YouGov poll on behalf of the SZ Dossier found that a slim majority of Germans support federal agencies' use of Palantir: 51% of respondents partly or completely supported it, 30% partly or completely opposed it, and 19% did not give a response. Nevertheless, civil skepticism of the company and software remains prominent; a petition on the platform Campact gathered 84,000 signatures against Palantir within a few hours and has more than 400,000 as of September 2025.

=== Work with the IDF and Israel ===
Palantir's work with the IDF is often considered controversial, leading to criticism from organizations like Amnesty International. In 2024, Norwegian Storebrand withdrew its investment from the company, saying that the collaboration with Israel might risk "violating international humanitarian law and human rights".

In 2024, when the Social Democrats suspended Irish politician and former Palantir employee Eoin Hayes for giving incorrect information about when he sold his Palantir shares, politicians from People Before Profit–Solidarity, including Richard Boyd Barrett and Paul Murphy, said that Hayes had financial involvement with a genocide.

=== Corporate tax practices ===
An Institute on Taxation and Economic Policy (ITEP) report found that Palantir Technologies paid no U.S. federal income tax in 2025 despite reporting about $1.5 billion in domestic income. According to the analysis, the company's zero tax liability was largely due to provisions in recent U.S. tax legislation, particularly rules allowing immediate deduction of research and development expenses, which significantly reduced its taxable income. The report also noted that Palantir has benefited from substantial government contracts, including work with U.S. Immigration and Customs Enforcement (ICE), while simultaneously receiving tax advantages through the federal tax code.

=== AI-assisted targeting tools ===
In April 2026, Palantir published a manifesto based on a book co-authored by Alex Karp that frames AI weapons proliferation using Cold War-style deterrence logic, warning that adversaries "will proceed" regardless of ethical debate, which has faced backlash for framing AI weapons development as inevitable and necessary for US hegemony. The manifesto's claim that "No other country in the history of the world has advanced progressive values more than this one" has been criticized by academics and analysts for Western supremacism.

In June 2025, Francesca Albanese's report for the United Nations on corporations complicit in the Gaza genocide named Palantir as a source of AI tools linked to the Israeli military's activities in Gaza.

== Corporate affairs ==
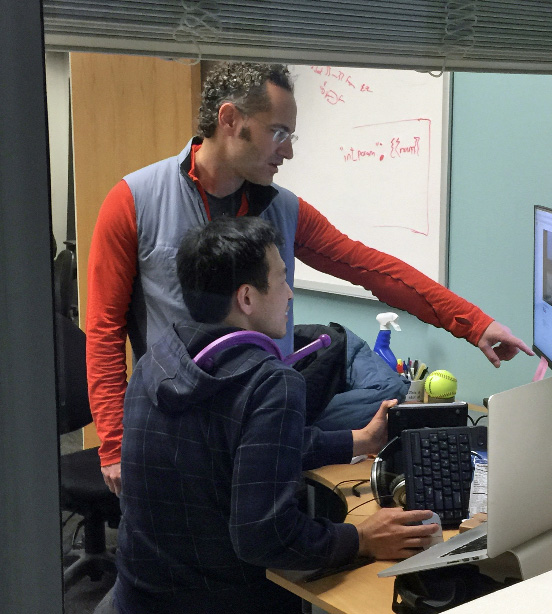
Alex Karp at work, December 2015

=== Leadership ===
==== Board of directors ====
As of January 2026, the board of directors of Palantir includes:

- Alex Karp, CEO of Palantir
- Alexander Moore, co-founder and former CEO of NodePrime
- Alexandra Schiff, former reporter of The Wall Street Journal
- Stephen Cohen, president of Palantir
- Peter Thiel, chairman of Palantir
- Lauren Friedman Stat, former Fractional Chief Administration Officer at Friendly Force
- Eric Woersching, former general partner at Initialized Capital

==== Executive management ====
As of October 2025, the executive management of Palantir includes:

- Alex Karp, CEO. He is also co-managing director at Frankfurt-based Palantir Technologies Gmbh.
- Stephen Cohen, Co-Founder, President, Secretary, and Director
- Shyam Sankar, Chief Technology Officer and Executive Vice President
- David Glazer, Chief Financial Officer and Treasurer
- Ryan Taylor, Chief Revenue Officer and Chief Legal Officer

=== Other personnel ===
Jamie Fly, former Radio Free Europe president and CEO, serves as senior counselor to the CEO. Fabrice Brégier is president of Palantir France. He is the former COO and president of commercial aircraft at Airbus. Koichi Narasaki is CEO of Palantir Japan. Previously, he was group chief digital officer of SOMPO Holdings, with which Palantir has a joint venture. Louis Mosley is the head and executive vice president of Palantir Technologies UK. Details about Palantir Korea's boards of directors are not fully known, but one board member is Shawn Pelsinger, who is also Acrisure's chief administrative officer.

As a firm doing sensitive work for governments, Palantir has connections with politicians, and some of its former employees have become public officials. This type of relationship (sometimes called a "revolving door") can cause controversy. Laura Rudas is the executive vice president of strategy. She is a former Austrian politician, having served as secretary-general of the Social Democrats and as a member of the Austrian Parliament. She left for Palantir despite having won a national reelection campaign. Mike Gallagher, former Chair of the House Committee on the Chinese Communist Party (2023–2024), is head of defense.

French politician Julie Martinez (Socialist Party) is the global data protection officer (she has worked for Palantir for three years) and her party's spokesperson, having been appointed to this office in September 2025. She and Palantir's reputation have caused controversy in France, but her party says the situation is not problematic. She also heads the think tank France Positive.

David MacNaughton, former ambassador of Canada to the United States (2016–2019), is president of Palantir Technologies Canada. He resigned his ambassadorship to join the firm. His activities involving Palantir before and after his resignation have been controversial. Jacob Helberg, former senior advisor to Karp, is now the U.S. Under Secretary of State for Economic Growth, Energy, and the Environment. Mike Kelly is president of Palantir Australia. He served as Parliamentary Secretary for Defence from 2011 to 2013 and Minister for Defence Materiel in 2013. Matthew Turpin, former director for China at the White House National Security Council and senior advisor for China to the Secretary of Commerce during the first Trump administration, serves as senior advisor.

In September 2026 Tom Watson, former deputy leader of the UK Labour party under Jeremy Corbyn, joined Palantir as a senior vice president.

=== Ownership ===
The largest shareholders of Palantir in early 2024 were:

| Shareholder name | Percentage |
|---|---|
| The Vanguard Group | 9.4% |
| Peter Thiel | 7.2% |
| BlackRock | 4.7% |
| SOMPO Holdings | 3.9% |
| Alex Karp | 2.5% |
| Renaissance Technologies | 2.1% |
| State Street Corporation | 1.9% |
| Geode Capital Management | 1.4% |
| Jane Street Capital | 1.1% |
| Eaton Vance | 1.1% |
| D. E. Shaw & Co. | 1.0% |
| Others | 66.2% |

=== Voting structure ===
Palantir has a special voting structure, tied to the classification of shares into Class A, Class B and Class F. The Class F shares, totaling 1,005,000, are managed by the Founder Voting Trust and owned equally by the three founders Thiel, Karp, and Cohen, which ensures them a 49.99% voting interest regardless of the number of other shares they hold or the number of new shares the company issues. In response to criticism that the founders wanted to remain "emperors for life", they said the creation of the Class F shares did not violate the law or the company charter and had been approved by a majority of other Palantir investors when the firm went public in 2020. In 2025, Bloomberg wrote:

Because of the company's growing role in world affairs, super voting shares also confer real power onto Thiel, Karp and Cohen that will extend to the company's relationships with militaries and other agencies.

That could come in handy if, say, the company received a takeover bid from a foreign adversary. And it could prevent the company from bending to pressure from bad actors, domestically or otherwise, while allowing management to stay the course on long-term plans. But it also insulates an increasingly powerful company from a measure of accountability offered by the public markets.

The founders, executives, and "insiders" also hold Class B shares, each of which carries ten votes, while the publicly traded Class A shares carry only one vote each. Class B shares can be converted to Class A shares on a 1-to-1 basis to be sold to outsiders.

=== Finances ===
For the fiscal year 2024, Palantir reported earnings of $462 million, with annual revenue of $2.9 billion, an increase of 28.8% over the previous fiscal cycle.

| Year | Revenue (US$ ml.) | Net income (US$ ml.) | Total assets (US$ ml.) | Employees |
|---|---|---|---|---|
| 2018 | 595 | −598 | − | − |
| 2019 | 743 | −588 | 3,735 | 2,391 |
| 2020 | 1,093 | −1,166 | 2,691 | 2,439 |
| 2021 | 1,542 | −520 | 3,247 | 2,920 |
| 2022 | 1,906 | −374 | 3,461 | 3,838 |
| 2023 | 2,225 | 210 | 4,522 | 3,735 |
| 2024 | 2,866 | 462 | 6,341 | 3,936 |
| 2025 | 4,628 | 1,133 | — | 4,127 |

For Q4 2025, Palantir reported revenue of $1.4 billion, a 70% increase year-over-year, driven largely by rapid enterprise adoption of its AI Platform (AIP). U.S. commercial revenue rose 137% year-over-year to $507 million. Total contract value reached a record $4.3 billion in the quarter. For 2026, management guided revenue of approximately $2.2 billion, implying 61% growth.

In December 2025, the UK Ministry of Defence awarded Palantir a £240 million three-year contract.

== Influence on other companies ==
Palantir's success has led a new wave of companies (mostly in the defense sector) to follow its business model, often connected to its personnel. The Wall Street Journal and Business Insider have described a "Palantir Mafia" that they compared to the PayPal Mafia. The Wall Street Journal has written that venture-capital firms, such as Palumni VC and XYZ Capital, have emerged with a mission to invest in startups founded by former Palantir employees. Those mentioned include founders of companies like Anduril Industries, 8VC, Addepar, and Ironclad. Joe Lonsdale also co-founded anti-drone tech startup Epirus.

The German unicorn Helsing was built as a German or European answer to Palantir. Thiel also had a role in Helsing's success, and the company is considered part of the "Thiel ecosystem", though he does not directly invest in it. Govradar is a startup focused on public procurement for the German government and Bundeswehr. It was founded in 2020 by former Palantir employee Sascha Goyk, who has also served as a Bundeswehr reserve officer since 2005. His task at Palantir was developing solutions to make the company's data analytics platform accessible to German police and intelligence agencies, but because Palantir faced intense scrutiny, he left and founded his own company. Nordic Air Defence (NAV) is a Swedish startup developing counter-drone missile technology that is staffed by former employees of Palantir and Quantum-Systems, which is backed by Thiel Capital. Thiel-backed SNÖ Ventures invests in NAV.

The French startup Comand AI, founded in 2023 by Antoine Chassang (ex-Snapchat) and Loïc Mougeolle (ex-Naval Group), aims to be a more adaptive alternative to Palantir. Its team was poached from Palantir, OpenAI, and Anduril. The British company Arondite was founded by Will Blyth (also CEO), a former British Army officer who had also worked for Palantir and Helsing. The Israeli defense tech startup Kela was founded by Hamutal Meridor (president, former officer in the Israeli army, and former head of Palantir's general operations in Israel), Alon Dror (CEO and former Israeli tank platoon commander), Jason Manne, and Omer Bar Ilan. Like Palantir, Kela develops commercial and military systems "in service of Western defense". London-based Conduct is a company founded by three ex-Palantir employees to overhaul legacy ERP systems, with a focus on SAP.

In 2024, alongside General Catalyst and Red Cell Partners, the Founders Fund incubated the defense incubator Valinor Enterprises. The co-founders are former Palantir senior vice president Julie Bush (CEO), Trae Stephens, General Catalyst's Paul Kwan, and Red Cell's Grant Verstandig. The team is sourced from Palantir, Anduril, and Helsing. The firm also has strategic relationships with these companies. In 2025, biodefense company Valthos emerged from stealth, with backing from Lux Capital, OpenAI, and Founders Fund. Its co-founders are Kathleen McMahon (CEO), who previously served as leader of Palantir's life sciences division, and Lux Capital partner Tess van Stekelenburg. Beijing-based Deepexi (滴普科技) is seen as China's effort to build a version of Palantir. It went public in Hong Kong on October 28, 2025. Its website calls it an "enterprise- large-model artificial intelligence (AI) application solution provider and a National Specialised and Innovative 'Little Giant' Enterprise", using a "general-purpose enterprise operational decision-making large model". The IPO prompted Brijesh Singh, a senior IPS officer, to call on India to build a similar company to treat data as strategic infrastructure and fuse the military and civil spheres.

In 2025, a Dutch start-up called Onodrim (named after the Elvish term for treelike Ents in Lord of the Rings) was founded by Palantir alumni. Its mission is to "help Europe's defence industry increase its production capacity and deliver on government orders" and to strengthen industrial foundations in Europe, focussing on defence. In 2026, Onodrim raised $300 million at a $1.3 billion valuation. It aims to use the money to buy stakes in dual-use businesses that have "technologies [they] think are critical for European supply chains".

=== Palantir Startup Fellowship ===
Palantir Startup Fellowship is a global program designed to accelerate AI startups and help them to integrate their infrastructure with Palantir's software. Companies selected for the first cohort include Korean Enhans (solutions for real-time decision making), and Rune Technologies (a military logistics company founded by Anduril alumni and backed by Andreessen Horowitz).

== See also ==
- Government by algorithm
- Military AI
- Data management platform
