= Nathan Gettings =

American engineer and entrepreneur

Nathan Dale Gettings
- Education: University of Illinois Urbana-Champaign
- Occupations: Software engineer, entrepreneur
- Known for: Palantir, RoboteX, Affirm Holdings

Nathan Dale Gettings is a software engineer and entrepreneur who has served as co-founder and CTO of Palantir Technologies, co-founder and CEO of RoboteX, co-founder and chief risk officer at Affirm Holdings, and chief data advisor to Leeo, Inc.

== Early life ==
The New Yorker says that Gettings was 32 in 2009. Max Chafkin notes that he was in his late twenties when Palantir was founded. In 2019, Marcus Roth notes that although it is known that Gettings is a "key mind behind the United States' current intelligence software", his past including academic records seems to be kept obscured for security-related reasons. Nathan Gettings and his younger brother Adam grew up in a Southern Illinois farm.

Gettings graduated from University of Illinois Urbana-Champaign with a degree in mathematics in 1998. Wired notes that Gettings graduated from Illinois Mathematics and Science Academy in 1995.

== Career ==
=== PayPal ===
Gettings worked as an engineer at PayPal as an early employee. He served under Max Levchin, who was also from the University of Urbana Illinois-Champaign and presided over PayPal's software Igor, a fraud-detection system primarily used by the company to catch Russian cybercriminals. Gettings was director of risk and R&D at PayPal. Levchin later notes that Gettings was "my chief risk guy at PayPal." James da Costa writes that the solution (for combatting fraud) Levchin, Gettings, Jawed Karim and Joe Lonsdale developed at PayPal "accidentally developed another industry entirely: fraud detection."

=== Palantir Technologies (2003–2012) ===
Gettings was a co-founder of the defense technology company Palantir alongside Peter Thiel, Alex Karp, Stephen Cohen and Joe Lonsdale, and served as its long-time CTO. Palantir was incorporated in 2003. Thiel, Gettings and Stanford alumni Cohen and Lonsdale had started Palantir from the office of Thiel's Clarium Capital Later, they were joined by Karp, whom Gettings, Cohen, and Lonsdale persuaded Thiel to make the CEO. Thiel paid for Gettings, Cohen and Lonsdale to build a prototype for Palantir. The technology is based on the previous work on PayPal's Igor. He played an important role "in building the core data and product architecture of Palantir in its early days". According to author Max Chafkin, among the three (dubbed by Chafkin as "a mix of Stanford conservatives and a genius coder"), Gettings, was considered the senior.

Igor served as the inspiration but it could not be used to directly combat terrorism. Chafkin notes that intelligence work is noticeably messier in comparison with preventing financial fraud, because intelligence work deals with reports written by human analysts who disagree with each other, and then are stored in different, sometimes incompatible software and hardware formats, thus requiring a large pool of personnel to clean up the data. In addition, the founders had no connection with the government; the comparatively low pay and the arcane nature of Palantir's work, according to Gettings, also made it hard to attract talented employees. At the beginning, the goal set for Gettings and Cohen was modest: building a prototype that could prove the idea of Palantir as plausible. When they showed the prototype, built by Gettings (or Gettings and Cohen according to Michael Steinberger), the potential customers' and investors' reaction was that it was interesting but could never work. Gettings, Cohen and Lonsdale almost gave up, but Thiel pushed the company forward. After a failed pitch to Sequoia in 2004, Palantir was recommended by an investor to meet with In-Q-Tel. After an initial meeting, In-Q-Tel's Gilman Louie told them to improve the interface. Cohen and Gettings then built a demo, which was praised by Louie. The In-Q-Tel investment led to connections with defense and intelligence communities.

Gettings left the company in 2012 to start Affirm with Max Levchin.

=== Affirm ===
Gettings served as co-founder and chief risk officer for Affirm. Together with Max Levchin and Jeff Kaditz, he "started Affirm on the belief that the current FICO-based credit rating system is not working for many consumers". Levchin recounted Gettings told him that one thing PayPal should have done was lending, since "FICO score is so old, and it's so inaccurate". That conversation and similar ones led to Levchin's decision to start Affirm.

=== RoboteX ===
In 2007, he co-founded the company RoboteX with his brother Adam Gettings and Terry Izumi. Some sources including the SEC file dated 2008 list Nathan Gettings as the CEO or executive officer. Other sources list Alex Karp as the chief executive. In 2016, Le Point notes that Karp ran RoboteX in his spare time. The company provided remote-controlled security robots for firefighters, police and SWAT teams. The company was the idea of Thiel. Thiel also served on the board as director and investor. After Robotex presented some early robot prototypes, clients said that they wanted smaller, easier-to-carry machines, so the Gettings brothers changed their focus and built mini robots with tank treads. In 2021, the company was listed as the provider of robots for the police department in Fairfield city. The company later went out of business.

=== Others ===
He served as chief data advisor to Leeo, Inc., a startup that was co-founded by his brother Adam Gettings and provided smart home services and products.

Gettings is an early investor in the company Tala Finance (Series A).

Gettings is president of the committee of founding at the CHiwi Foundation (Stiftung CHiwi), which is a grant-giving research foundation in Zug, Switzerland. It backs programs such as ETH Zurich's LunarLeaper, and USC Information Sciences Institute's Space Engineering Research Center's PhD program.

== Personal life ==
Gettings is noted to have a low-profile lifestyle and has been known as the quietest of the co-founders of Palantir.
