= Wejo =

British vehicle data company

Wejo Group Ltd
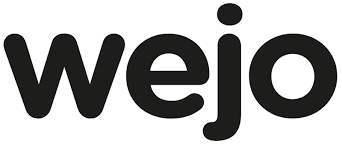
- Wejo logo
- Company type: Public company
- Traded as: OTC Pink: WEJOQ; Nasdaq: WEJO (2021–23)
- Industry: Automotive Data
- Founded: 2013; 13 years ago
- Founder: Richard Barlow
- Defunct: June 2023
- Headquarters: Manchester, England, UK
- Products: Connected Vehicle Data
- Revenue: US$8.4 million (2022)
- Number of employees: 275 (2022)
- Website: wejo.com(no longer updated)

Wejo Group Ltd was a British connected vehicle data start-up founded by entrepreneur Richard Barlow, headquartered in Greater Manchester, England. Wejo served customers worldwide and was founded in 2013.

The company, which was backed by General Motors, went through a special purpose acquisition (SPAC) merger in 2021. The merger raised $330M for Wejo including $230M from the SPAC company Virtuoso and the other $125M from private investment in public equity (PIPE) financing.

Wejo called in administrators at the end of May 2023, following a loss of investment capital.

== History ==
Wejo was founded in 2013 above a Greek restaurant in Manchester. "Wejo" stands for "we journey.

In November 2019, Wejo opened a second UK office in the centre of Manchester's technology and enterprise zone.

Wejo participated in 3 rounds of funding following its founding and raised $120.2M in capital. At one point, it was classed as one of the UK’s prospective billion dollar-valued firms.

At the end of May 2023, Wejo called in administrators as it ran out of investment capital.

== Partnerships ==
On 29 June 2021, it was announced that Microsoft and Japanese insurance giant Sompo had joined Palantir in partnering with Wejo.

== Technology ==
Wejo streamed and standardized high volumes of anonymized vehicle data. The data was delivered from the vehicle source to the end-user customer within 32 seconds.

Wejo had the largest number of accessible connected vehicles on its platform, with 42 million in 2019. Up to July 2020, Wejo had curated over 140 billion miles of data.
