= Shivani Siroya =

American businessperson

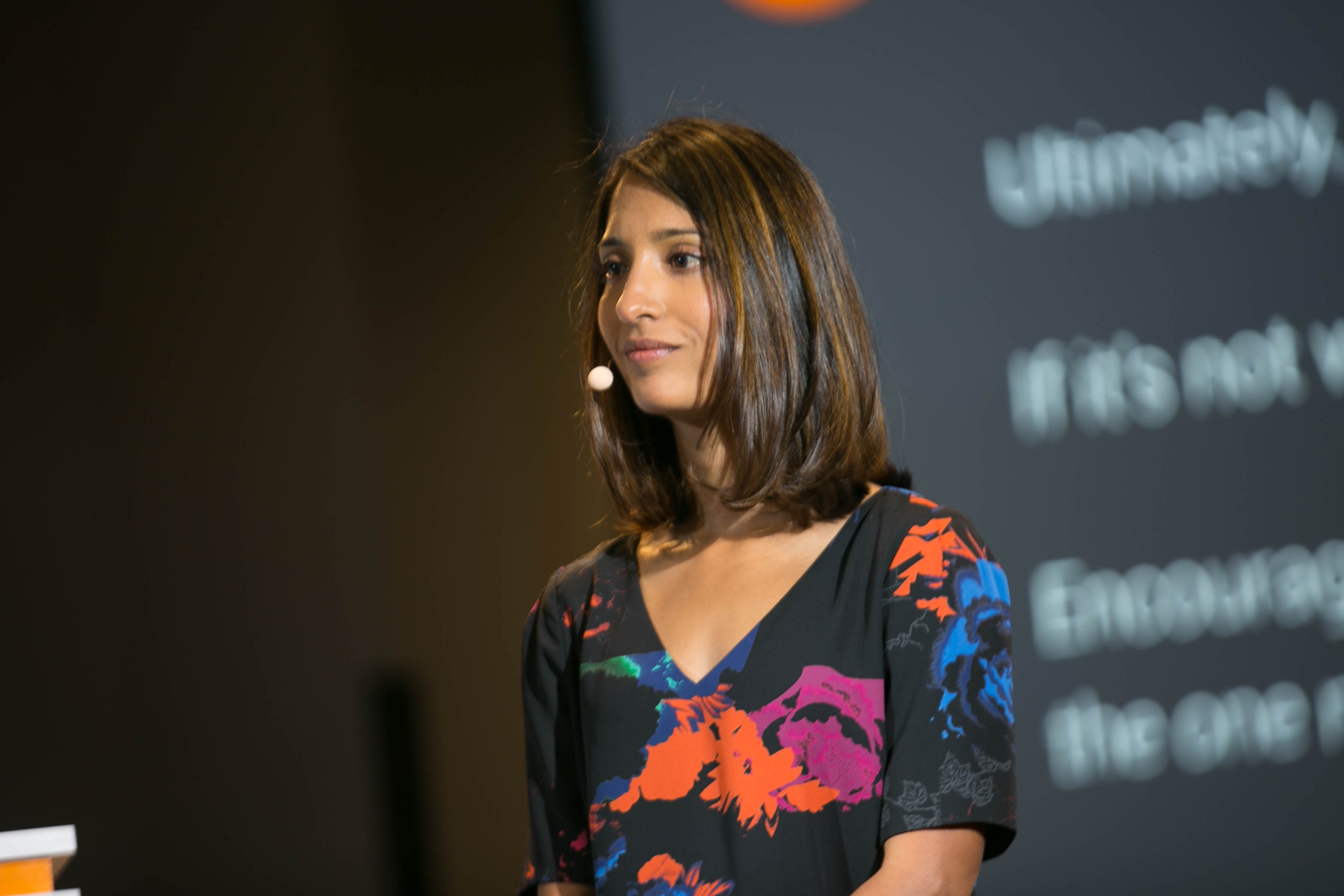
- Employer: Tala
- Title: Founder and CEO
- Website: tala.co

Shivani Siroya is the founder and chief executive officer of Tala, a smartphone lending app. She founded the app in 2011 to offer instant credit scores to people in underrepresented markets such as Kenya, Tanzania, India, and the Philippines. The app also acts as a lender and has granted more than $225M in microloans as of 2018.

In April 2018, the app secured $65 million in funding from Female Founders Fund, Lowercase Capital and Revolution Capital, among others. Its total funding is over $105 million.

Prior to founding Tala, Siroya worked for the UN Population Fund. She also worked at Citi, UBS and Credit Suisse in microfinance jobs.

Siroya has a M.P.H. in Health Economics and Policy from Columbia University and a B.A. from Wesleyan University in International Relations.

Melinda Gates nominated Siroya in 2018 as a Wired Icon.

Siroya was named an Ashoka Fellow in 2013. Fellows are leading social entrepreneurs recognized for their innovative solutions to social problems and potential to change patterns across society.

Tala was named to the CNBC Disruptor 50 list in 2024.
