= Matthew Turpin =

American security analyst

- Education: United States Military Academy (BS); University of North Carolina at Chapel Hill (MA)
- Occupations: Security analyst, former U.S. defense official
- Employer(s): Palantir Technologies; Hoover Institution

Matthew Turpin is an American security analyst and former U.S. Army Officer specializing in US-China relations, economic statecraft, and technological innovation. He is currently a visiting fellow at the Hoover Institution and a senior advisor at Palantir Technologies. Between 2018 and 2019, Turpin served as director for China at the White House National Security Council and senior advisor for China to the Secretary of Commerce during the Trump administration.

== Life and career ==
Turpin holds a BS in history from the United States Military Academy and a MA in history from the University of North Carolina at Chapel Hill. He served in the U.S. Army in multiple combat units in the US, Europe and the Middle East. He was also an assistant professor of history at the US Military Academy.

From 2010 to 2013, Turpin was the Chief of Crisis Planning at the United States Pacific Command. From 2013 to 2017, he served a China advisor to the chairman and Vice Chairman of the Joint Chiefs of Staff at the Pentagon. He retired from the Army in 2017.

Turpin was reportedly involved in discussions about which PRC companies to add to the U.S. Commerce Department's black list in 2019. In a September 2022 interview with Politico about the Biden administration's restrictions on microchip transfers to Russia, he said: "China and Russia share a 4,300-kilometer border. There is absolutely no way we could detect if those chips are passed from China to Russia.”

== Views on US-China relations ==
Turpin believes the US and China are already in a new cold war, an argument he first made in a November 2021 op-ed for The Wire China. In a September 2023 written debate on the same topic hosted by the Brookings Institution, he stressed the importance for Americans to understand the Chinese government perceived US engagement strategy "as an existential threat to the party" and explained:

For the last few years, a new geopolitical condition has emerged. The United States and the People's Republic of China coexist in a multipolar world in which each side is deeply suspicious of and hostile to the worldview of the other. Simultaneously, both countries recognize that they cannot overpower their rival, which compels both to avoid direct military conflict, while pushing their rivalry into other domains. This geopolitical condition is called a cold war.

Turpin defined "cold war" as a condition rather than strategy, noting it is:

A term synonymous with a long-term, acute geopolitical rivalry across all domains short of direct military conflict. The objective of a “cold war” is to outlast your rival and win without fighting. States that find themselves in a cold war must develop a strategy that fits the circumstances.

== Publications ==
=== Reports ===
- Crafting a Competitive Response: A Framework for Countering China's Digital Ambitions, National Bureau of Asian Research, March 1, 2022
- Chapter 9: Mitigating the Impact of China's Nonmarket Behavior in Semiconductors, in Silicon Triangle: The United States, Taiwan, China, and Global Semiconductor Security (Hoover Institution & Asia Society), July 2023 (co-authored with Robert Daly)

=== Articles ===
- Yes, This is a Cold War, The Wire China, November 14, 2021
- China's spy balloon: A new cold war unfolds before our eyes, The Hill, February 7, 2023
