= Ironclad (disambiguation) =

An ironclad is a wooden ship, or ship of composite construction, sheathed with thick iron plates.

Ironclad may also refer to:

- Casemate ironclad, a particular type of ironclad warship in use during the American Civil War-era
- Ironclad (film), a 2011 action film
- Ironclad (game), a 1973 miniatures wargaming series by Guidon Games
- Ironclad (video game), a video game for the Neo Geo CD console
- Ironclad (comics), a Marvel comic book supervillain
- Ironclad (software), a contract management software company
- "Ironclad", a song by Sleater-Kinney from All Hands on the Bad One
- "Ironclad", a song by Yngwie Malmsteen from Attack!!
- Ironclads (film), a 1991 TNT television film
- Ironclads: American Civil War, a computer game
- Ironclads: High Seas, a computer game
- Operation Ironclad or the Battle of Madagascar, the World War II British occupation of Diego Suarez, Madagascar
- Ironclad Games, a video game developer
- Legio VI Ferrata (Legion 6 Ironclad), a Roman legion
- Ironclad, a steam locomotive on the Keighley and Worth Valley Railway
- Ironclads (novella), a 2017 novella by Adrian Tchaikovsky
- Battle of Ironclads, 1862 battle of the American Civil War
