= Sompo Japan =

Japanese insurance company

Sompo Japan Insurance Inc.
- Logo used since 2020

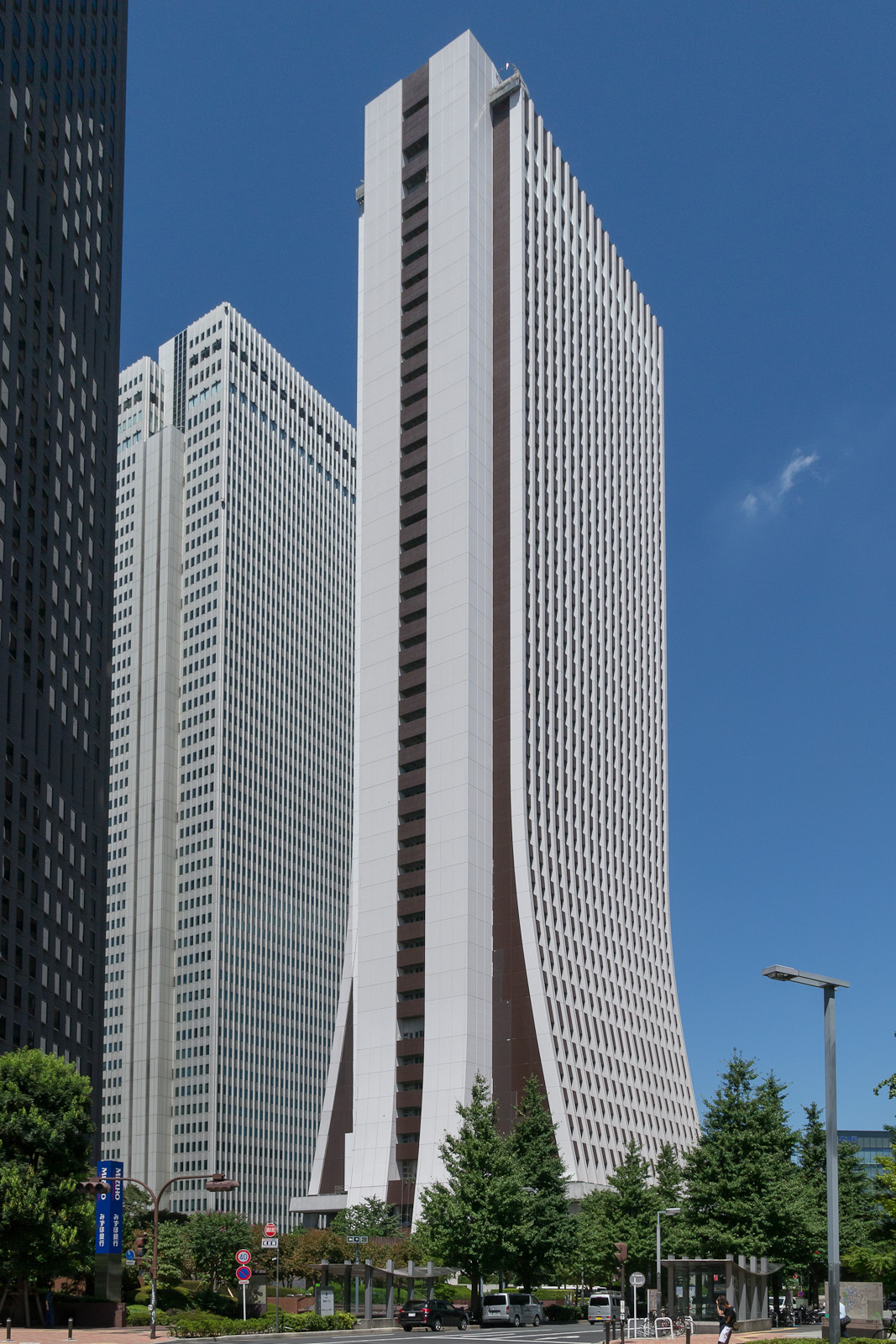
- The Sompo Japan Building, in Shinjuku, Tokyo
- Native name: 損害保険ジャパン株式会社
- Romanized name: Songai Hoken Japan Kabushiki-gaisha
- Formerly: Tokyo Fire Insurance (1887-1944); The Yasuda Fire & Marine Insurance Co., Ltd. (1944-2002); Sompo Japan Insurance Inc. (2002-2015); Sompo Japan Nipponkoa Insurance Inc. (2015-2020)
- Company type: Subsidiary
- Traded as: TYO: 8755
- Industry: Insurance
- Founded: 1887; 139 years ago (as Tokyo Fire Insurance)
- Headquarters: Nishi-Shinjuku, Shinjuku Tokyo, Japan
- Area served: Worldwide
- Key people: Koji Ishikawa (President & CEO)
- Revenue: ▲JPY ¥ 4,167.4 billion (FY 2022)
- Net income: ▲JPY ¥ 224.8 billion (FY 2022)
- Owner: SOMPO Holdings
- Number of employees: 47,776 (March, 2022)
- Website: www.sompo-japan.co.jp/english/

Sompo Japan, Inc. (損害保険ジャパン株式会社, Songai Hoken Japan Kabushiki-gaisha; lit. "General Insurance Japan"), formerly known as Sompo Japan Nipponkoa Insurance, Inc. (損害保険ジャパン日本興亜株式会社, Songai Hoken Japan Nihonkoa), is a Japanese insurance company. It is the second-largest property insurance company in Japan only behind Tokio Marine, with market share of 19.3% in 2007. As of 2010, the company is a wholly owned subsidiary of SOMPO Holdings.

The “Sompo” in the company's name means “general insurance" (損害保険, songai hoken) in Japanese, though Sompo Japan offers a range of financial services including life insurance, securities, asset management and venture capital businesses.

== History ==
Tokyo Fire Insurance Company, Ltd. was established in 1887 as Japan's first fire insurance company. The company worked to cultivate an awareness of fire insurance, and five branch offices were added within a year. The major Yokosuka fire of 1890, however, nearly toppled the fledgling company.

In 1893, Japanese entrepreneur Zenjiro Yasuda absorbed the Tokyo Fire Insurance Company into the Yasuda zaibatsu. Later, in 1944, Tokyo Fire Insurance, Imperial Marine Insurance, and First Engine & Boiler Insurance merged to become the Yasuda Fire & Marine Insurance Company (安田火災海上保険).

Yasuda Fire made a successful bid for Van Gogh's "Sunflower" paintings for about 5.3 billion yen in 1987.

On July 1, 2002, Yasuda Fire and Nissan Fire & Marine Insurance (日産火災海上保険) merged into a new company, Sompo Japan Insurance Inc.

In December 2002, Sompo Japan acquired Taisei Fire & Marine Insurance.

In September 2014, Sompo Japan acquired Nipponkoa Insurance.

In December 2022, the heirs to the Jewish banker and art collector Paul von Mendelsohn-Bartholdly filed suit in Chicago to reclaim the Van Gogh, alleging that the insurance company ignored the Holocaust-linked history of the painting during its acquisition in 1987.

In 2023, Sompo Japan was implicated in an insurance fraud scandal along with Big Motor, then the largest used car dealer in Japan. According to the Financial Services Agency, despite being alerted to systematic insurance fraud at Big Motor in 2022, Sompo Japan decided to continue business with the dealer, despite two other major insurers suspending business and conducting an investigation. When this investigation confirmed systematic and pervasive insurance fraud at Big Motor, suspicion fell on Sompo Japan due to their close business relationship with Big Motor. On September 19 2023, Sompo Japan's offices in Shinjuku, Tokyo were raided by the Financial Services Agency, and it was revealed that Sompo Japan's management was aware of the fraud but decided to ignore it in exchange for Big Motor prioritizing selling Sompo Japan insurance. After the Financial Services Agency ordered Sompo Japan to improve managerial practices in the wake of the scandal, President Giichi Shirakawa resigned on 26 January 2024, and CEO Kengo Sakurada stepped down in March 2024.

== International operations ==
Sompo Japan Nipponkoa has offices and subsidiaries in 28 countries, providing insurance services and risk management.

=== Asia Pacific ===
In 1991, PGA Yasuda Insurance Company, Inc., was established in Partnership with Prudential Guarantee and Assurance Inc. In September 2014, upon acquisition of Nippon Koa, it is now named PGA Sompo Insurance Corporation.

In June 2005, Sompo Japan established Sompo Japan Insurance (China) Co., Ltd. in Dalian, China.

Sompo Japan's Australian branch has more than 35 years of operating history.

In 2007, Sompo Japan developed its business in Malaysia by purchasing a 30% stake of Berjaya General Insurance Bhd, now Berjaya Sompo Insurance.

In 2008, Sompo Japan established a joint venture with Karnataka Bank, Indian Overseas Bank and Allahabad Bank (Which later merged with Indian Bank and Dabur Investment Corp. in India, Universal Sompo General Insurance (main office in Mumbai).

In 2022, Sompo Indonesia partnered with Roojai Insurance to provide online car insurance services.

=== Europe ===
Sompo Japan has been serving clients in Europe for about 50 years with offices in the United Kingdom, Belgium, France, Germany, Italy, the Netherlands, Spain and Turkey. Sompo Japan Insurance Company of Europe, a corporate member of Lloyd's of London since 1993, conducts underwriting and provides claim settlement, risk management and insurance information mainly to Japanese companies.

In April 2014, Sompo concluded the purchase of specialist Lloyd's of London market company Canopius Group for £594m.

=== Americas ===
Through its subsidiary Sompo Japan Insurance Company of America, headquartered in New York, Sompo Japan conducts property and casualty insurance operations in the United States and Canada. Sompo Japan Insurance De Mexico S.A. de C.V. started local operation in Mexico in 1998.

In South America, Sompo Japan's main base of operations is its subsidiary in Brazil, Yasuda Seguros S.A., established in 1958. The majority of Yasuda Seguros clients are local businesses and individuals.

In October 2016, Sompo Japan Nipponkoa has completed its acquisition of Bermuda-based insurer Endurance and will integrate it into its newly launched, fully integrated re/insurance platform in Bermuda, named Sompo International.

The new organization will have a board of its own, led by John Charman as chairman and CEO. He will report to Sompo CEO Kengo Sakurada. Charman was chairman and CEO of Endurance prior to its acquisition.

In October 2016, Sompo announced the initiation of processes to buy 100% of Endurance for the sum of US$6.3 billion. Endurance was delisted from the New York Stock Exchange upon completion of the transaction.
