= Ironclad (software) =

Software company

- Type: Private
- Industry: Technology
- Founders: Jason Boehmig, Cai GoGwilt
- Headquarters: San Francisco, United States
- Products: Contract lifecycle management software
- Number of employees: 700
- Website: ironcladapp.com

Ironclad is a software as a service company that makes contract management software. Founded in 2014 and headquartered in San Francisco, California, Ironclad provides a platform for legal and business teams to create, store, and manage contracts online in a process known as contract lifecycle management.

== Product and features ==
Ironclad, which is delivered as a cloud software application for a subscription fee, offers the ability to create customizable workflows to generate and sign digital contracts. In addition to traditional contracts, Ironclad supports clickwrap agreement tracking. Ironclad also allows legal teams to use AI to automatically scan contracts to extract key legal terms and assist lawyers with contract redlining, which is built using an integration with OpenAI's GPT-3 and GPT-4 large language models. Signed contracts are then accessible in Ironclad's contract repository, with integrations to store files in cloud storage services like OneDrive, Dropbox, Box, and Google Drive.

== History ==
Ironclad was founded in 2014 by Jason Boehmig, a former attorney at Fenwick & West, and Cai GoGwilt, a former software engineer at Palantir. The company participated in the summer 2015 batch of startup accelerator Y Combinator who provided the seed funding, and it launched with 200 companies already using the product in beta. By 2019, Ironclad was listed as one of the top 50 largest Y Combinator companies according to valuation.

=== Funding ===
Ironclad has received several rounds of funding since its founding. The company's Series A, led by Accel, raised $8 million in 2017. The Series B funding round was led by Sequoia Capital in 2018, raising $23 million. In 2019, Ironclad raised $50 million in a Series C round led by Y Combinator and joined by Emergence Capital, with participation from Accel and other investors. The company raised $100 million in Series D financing in 2021, and this round was led by Mary Meeker's BOND. In January 2022, Ironclad announced that it had raised $150 million in a Series E round funded entirely by existing investors, bringing the total private valuation to $3.2 billion.
