= Alex Karp =

American businessman (born 1967)

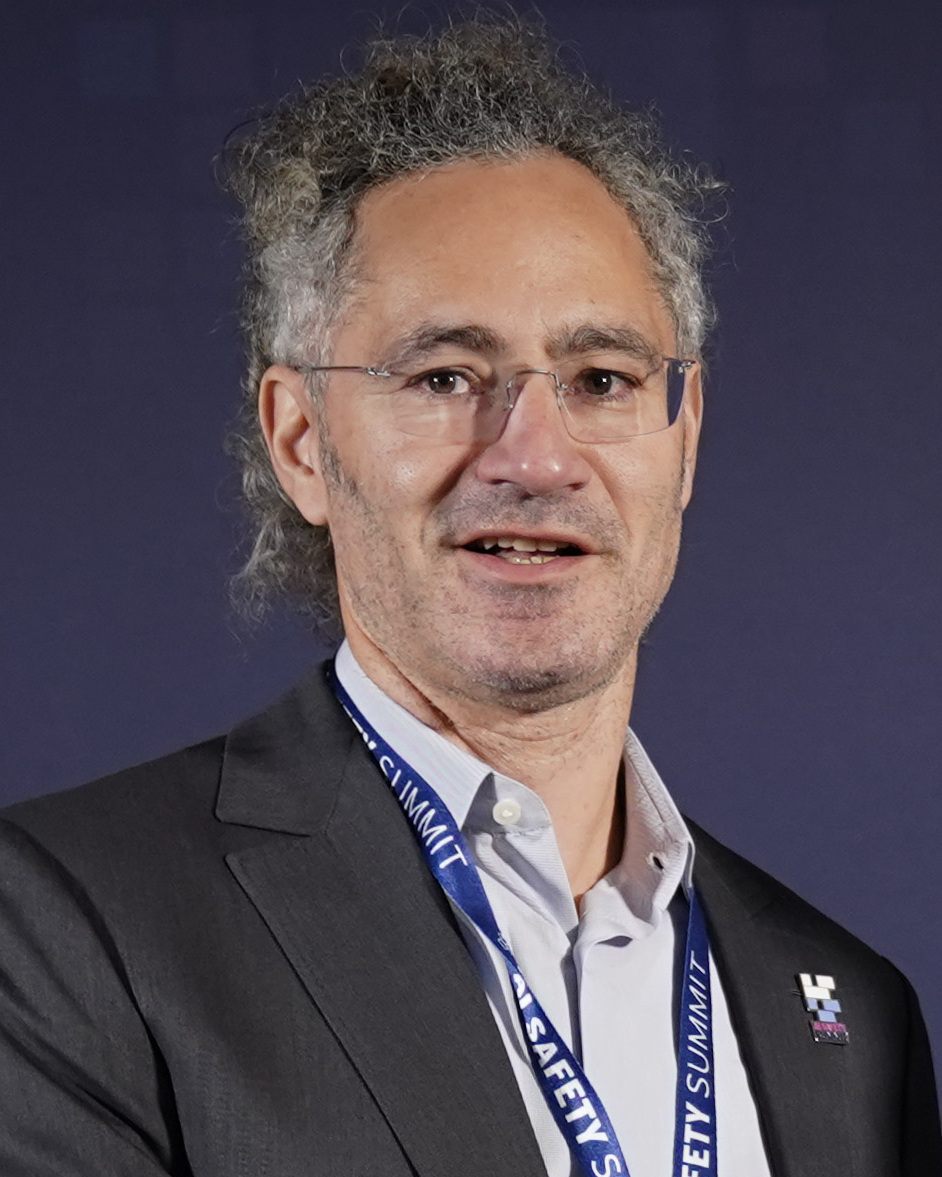
- Karp attending the AI Safety Summit in London, November 2023
- Born: Alexander Caedmon Karp; October 2, 1967 (age 59); New York City, U.S.
- Education: Haverford College (BA); Stanford University (JD); Goethe University Frankfurt (PhD)
- Occupation: Businessman
- Title: Co-founder and CEO, Palantir Technologies

Alexander Caedmon Karp (born October 2, 1967) is an American billionaire businessman and entrepreneur. He is the co-founder and CEO of the Silicon Valley-based software firm Palantir Technologies.

Karp earned his J.D. degree from Stanford Law School and a doctorate in social theory from Goethe University Frankfurt. He subsequently worked in finance, founding the investment firm Caedmon Group, where he managed money for clients including wealthy European investors and invested in start-up companies and stocks. At Stanford, he met Peter Thiel and in 2003, they alongside three others co-founded Palantir.

In 2025, Karp's net worth exceeded $18 billion, making him among the wealthiest 200 people in the world as reported by Forbes and the Bloomberg Billionaires Index, and Time magazine named him on the Time 100 list of the world's most influential people of that year.

== Early life and education ==
Alexander Caedmon Karp was born on October 2, 1967 in New York City, the eldest son of Robert Joseph Karp, a Jewish clinical pediatrician, and Leah Jaynes Karp, an African American artist. He grew up with his younger brother, Oliver "Ben" Karp, in Philadelphia.

Like his father, Karp attended Central High School in Philadelphia, graduating in 1985. He said he struggled with dyslexia from an early age. He was influenced by his parents' activism for civil rights and social justice during his youth and went to many protests. He said what he inherited from his maternal side was "a strong affinity to fighting discrimination". Karp stated that "some black people considered me black while some did not", and said, "I view me as me. And I'm very honored to be honored by all groups that will have me." Karp's recent ancestry on the paternal side of the family is from Germany. He said that before he went to Germany, he had underestimated how German his upbringing had been.

Karp initially wanted to be a social theorist. He earned a bachelor's degree in philosophy from Haverford College in Haverford, Pennsylvania, in 1989, then enrolled at Stanford Law School, where he earned a J.D. in 1992. While at Stanford, Karp met Peter Thiel. The two bonded over their exasperation with the law school and a passion for political debates. Thiel recalled that, "He was more the socialist, I was more the capitalist. He was always talking about Marxist theories of alienated labor and how this was true of all the people around us." Karp said that he felt different at "every institution I interacted with".

After his undergraduate studies and law school, Karp earned a Ph.D. in neoclassical social theory from Goethe University Frankfurt, Germany, in 2002. Thiel was the only one who supported his decision to pursue a doctorate at Frankfurt. His doctoral thesis was titled "Aggression in der Lebenswelt: Die Erweiterung des Parsonsschen Konzepts der Aggression durch die Beschreibung des Zusammenhangs von Jargon, Aggression und Kultur" (Aggression in the Lifeworld: The Extension of Parsons' Concept of Aggression by Describing the Connection Between Jargon, Aggression, and Culture). Karola Brede told him he could write the thesis in English, but he replied that it was important to him that he could write it in German. He lived in Frankfurt from the mid-1990s to 2001 and considered staying permanently, but ultimately decided to go back to the U.S. for work.

== Career ==
=== Business career ===
Karp began a career as a research associate at the Sigmund Freud Institute in Frankfurt. He received an inheritance of $12,000 from his paternal grandfather, with which he founded London-based money management firm Caedmon Group. After he gained some successes with the stock market, some European high-net-worth individuals invested in his company. Karp later claimed that his goal at the time was to amass $250,000 to return to Berlin to read and write as a dilettante, though he failed to explain how it was possible to build "a London-based money management firm" attracting "high net-worth investors" with $12,000.

For some time, he helped Thiel to gather funding for Clarium Capital. In 2004, along with Thiel and others, Karp co-founded Palantir Technologies, becoming its CEO.

The New York Times ranked Karp the highest-paid CEO of a publicly traded company in 2020, the year the company went public, with compensation worth $1.1 billion. In 2024, he was the highest-paid CEO of a publicly traded company in the United States, with a "compensation actually paid" of almost $6.8 billion. The Economist chose Karp, a former director of the publication, as the 2024 CEO of the Year. He is also co-managing director at Frankfurt-based Palantir Technologies Gmbh, and sits on the board of Palantir Technologies UK Ltd.

According to Steinberger, Karp had no previous technical or business training, but his background in philosophy helped with understanding ethical or political concerns. Karp criticizes companies like Google and Facebook for their attitude to data protection. Facebook became the foil against which Palantir defined its identity; when Palantir expanded in Palo Alto and took over a former Facebook office, they painted over a famous wall associated with Facebook. Among Palantir leadership, there were differences in philosophy, with Thiel complaining about Karp always choosing the hard, complex way when a more straightforward path might have sufficed. Despite this, Thiel largely left the operation of the company in Karp's hands.

In 2024, Karp was 1143rd on the Forbes annual World's Billionaires List with a net worth of $2.9 billion. In 2025 his net worth at times exceeded $18 billion, ranking him among the 200 wealthiest people in the world on the Forbes Real-Time Billionaires List and the Bloomberg Billionaires Index.

In 2026, Karp registered Cladonia Skog AB in Sweden; the company purchased 37,000 acres of forest in Härjedalen from paper manufacturer Svenska Cellulosa Aktiebolaget to "carry out forestry and other related activities".

==== Board and advisory roles ====
- Axel Springer SE, member of the board of directors (2018–2020) and shareholders committee (2022–2025)
- BASF, member of the board of directors (until 2020)
- The Business Council, member
- The Economist Group, former member of the board of directors
- RoboteX

Thiel initiated the idea of the company RoboteX, which was established in 2007 and headed by their Palantir co-founder Nathan Gettings. It provided robots for police, firefighters and SWAT teams. Thiel and Karp also served on the board as directors and investors.

=== Political activities ===
He is a frequent participant of the Reagan National Defense forum, which is an annual gathering of "generals, military strategists, and defense industrial companies", now also open to the technology side, as shown in the participation of Karp and Jeff Bezos. At the 2023 edition of the forum, he stated that "Somehow the corporate elite of this country thinks when it’s time to make money, you stand up, and when it’s time to stand up, you go play golf. And we’ve got to change that. That’s our fault".

The 2025 documentary Watching You: The World of Palantir and Alex Karp explores the political and business network that Karp has built in Germany. He helps build connections between American and German politicians through transatlantic organizations such as the Atlantik-Brücke.

He is a member of the steering committee of Bilderberg Meeting. The secret meeting between Karp, Thiel and Sweden's prime minister Ulf Kristersson at the 2025 Bilderberg meeting has caused controversies in Sweden (Kristersson was not on the official list). Karp also participates in the Munich Security Conference.

Dutch MEP Sophie in ’t Veld tracks the close proximity between Karp and his company Palantir with EU leaders like Ursula von der Leyen and Margrethe Vestager, noting that when the EU delegation visited Washington in 2019, the only private company they contacted was Palantir. In June 2022, he was the first CEO of a major Western company to meet president Volodymyr Zelenskyy after Russia invaded Ukraine. In June 2026, following Karp's visit to Ukraine, Ukraine's defense minister Mykhailo Fedorov said that it was an advantage for Ukraine to have Alex Karp, as well as others like Elon Musk and Eric Schmidt on their side. Fedorov described Palantir as an "effective IT weapon" that the Ukrainians had, but the Russians did not. Fedorov also recalled that Karp was very impressed with the way Ukraine integrated Palantir's technologies "into the general logic of warfare", thus contributing to the Western side's developed combat control systems (Palantir initially provided the software and services to Ukraine pro bono, including financing the new personnel they hired in Ukraine. Later as costs climbed, Ukraine's allies stepped in to offset the expenses).

== Views ==
=== Political views ===
==== On the West ====
In 2025 Time magazine listed Karp as one of the world's 100 most influential people, calling him "the embodiment of a new kind of Silicon Valley billionaire: an unashamed techno-nationalist who evangelizes Western power". In naming him to the Time 100 list, the magazine noted that Karp had once quoted Samuel P. Huntington's The Clash of Civilizations in a letter he wrote to investors: "The rise of the West was not made possible 'by the superiority of its ideas or values or religion ... but rather by its superiority in applying organized violence. [...] Westerners often forget this fact; non-Westerners never do.'" During a New York Times interview, Karp said that "you scare the crap out of your adversaries", asking, "Are we tough enough to scare our adversaries so we don’t go to war? Do the Chinese, Russians and Persians think we’re strong?" Maureen Dowd, a journalist, said the interview was "brim[ming] with American chauvinism".

In 2024 The New York Times again quoted Karp, who said that he and his company, Palantir, had "a consistently pro-Western view, that the West has a superior way of living and organizing itself". In the same interview, Karp said that the US would very likely face a three-front war against China, Russia, and Iran in the future. He opined that the best way to prepare for such a war would be developing autonomous weapons. In Karp's opinion, the West and the China-Russia-Iran axis were at technological parity. However, he added, the West had a disadvantage when it came to moral disparity because the West would likely not use nuclear weapons, although their adversaries might. He also told the Times that he favored military conscription.

==== On US politics ====
In 2018, Karp said he is a socialist and a progressive ("but not woke"). In addition he said he voted for Hillary Clinton. In 2024, the Financial Times identified Karp as "a major Biden donor". Current Affairs editor Nathan J. Robinson wrote in 2024 that Karp "seems to have some idiosyncratic personal definition in mind that has nothing in common with the socialist tradition". In 2024, Karp said that while he was "not thrilled" with the direction of the Democratic Party, he would still be "voting against Trump". That same year, he called for the Democrats to project more strength. He has also protested open-border immigration policies in the U.S. and Europe: "You have an open border, you get the far right. [...] And once you get them, you can't get rid of them." In 2025, he said that he views himself as a "classic liberal".

In a November 2025 interview with Wired, he said that to a family member that disagreed with him in a private conversation, "I would be pointing out that Trump’s decisions on AI, and his decisions on the Middle East, are very different than people in the Democratic Party would have made, and very good." Also, he would consider the Democratic Party to have left him if the Zohran Mamdani wing took over, which he viewed as the result of "[the] role played [by] universities and elite institutions [that are] teaching pagan religion views", describing one "[portraying an] AI-driven, AGI environment where no one has a job [because] labor is going to be valueless".

Interviewed by his biographer Michael Steinberger (whose book The Philosopher in the Valley: Alex Karp, Palantir, and the Rise of the Surveillance State was published in November 2025), Karp cites the Democrats' unresponsiveness to immigration, Iran and attitude to antisemitism ("They talk all the time about racism but won't talk about antisemitism") as reasons for his disillusion with the party. Steinberger remarks that Karp was particularly concerned about the anti-Israel protests that erupted after the October 7 attacks in Israel.

Karp has condemned "woke" ways of thinking, calling them the central risk to his company Palantir and to the United States as a whole. He has called Palantir a "counter-example" to companies he considers "woke". In 2025, he adopted the framing woke left and woke right, defining the former as the aforementioned Mamdani wing and the latter as "everything is a conspiracy, any use of technology is actually going to only be used to eviscerate and attack us", categorizing both as "[opposed to] meritocracy".

==== On the United States government ====
Karp said that technology companies like Palantir have an obligation to support the U.S. military. He said that he and Palantir are "active in defending the values of the West" and "our belief that the West is a superior way to live". He defended Palantir's contract with U.S. Immigration and Customs Enforcement (ICE) during the controversy over family separations, saying that while separations are "a really tough, complex, jarring moral issue", he favors "a fair but rigorous immigration policy". He said the U.S. government should have a strong hand in tech regulation and that western countries should dominate AI research.

==== Israel and the Gaza war ====
Karp has made a number of remarks about the Gaza war strongly supporting Israel. He strongly condemned the 2024 pro-Palestinian protests on university campuses, calling their views a "pagan religion" and "an infection inside of our society". At the AI Expo for National Competitiveness, he remarked that "the peace activists are war activists" and said that protestors should do an exchange program in North Korea.

In December 2023, during the demonstrations at Columbia University in Manhattan, New York, Karp said: "There is literally no way to explain the investment in our elite schools, and the output is a pagan religion—a pagan religion of mediocrity, and discrimination, and intolerance, and violence." Palantir announced that they would set aside 180 positions for Jewish college graduates, citing "antisemitism" on college campuses related to the protests.

==== On Germany ====
When Karp was a PhD student at Frankfurt, he criticized Martin Walser's opposition to Germany's culture of Holocaust remembrance. (Walser had argued that it was a moral cudgel that the liberal intelligentsia used to suppress nationalism in the newly united Germany.) Decades later, Karp and Nicholas Zamiska published The Technological Republic, which embraces Walser's idea, saying that it represented "the forbidden desires and feelings of a nation". Karola Brede, who served as referee for Karp’s doctoral dissertation, notes that Karp always had a type of political agility associated with liberalism. When Karp was young, he had an affinity with the FDP. He tried to persuade CDU member Michel Friedman, who lived on the same street in Frankfurt, that Friedman had chosen the wrong party. In 2019, however, Karp said that in Germany he would vote for the CDU. In 2026, Süddeutsche Zeitung notes that he is now close to the Christian Social Union (CSU).

In September 2025, Karp called on German leaders to "talk about the crisis". He suggested a plan to improve the situation in Germany and save the industry: (1) promoting the political power of the founders and business leaders, who would bring about the change, rather than promoting the power of the political class. He specifically referred to SAP CEO Christian Klein; (2) creating special technological zones with fewer regulations and laxer labor rules; (3) creating specialized micromodels of economic structures (instead of copying Silicon Valley) that focused on Germany's strengths in industrial AI for cars, pharmaceuticals, chemicals, and mechanical engineering; (4) informing the population about a looming economic crisis, explaining that both prosperity and the welfare state could only be maintained if industrial and technological development could be secured, while noting that German pacifism was the country's Achilles' heel and should be dealt with so that country could create sufficient deterrents; and (5) countering misguided policies on immigration, energy (especially nuclear energy policy) and technology, all of which had squandered the German advantage and should be changed. He saw his company Palantir as a continuation of Germany's cultural legacy and virtues. He also complained about the public's perception of his friend and co-founder Peter Thiel, who he said was undeservingly vilified by the media.

At the 2023 opening of Dimensions: Digital Art since 1859, an exhibit in Leipzig supported and sponsored by Karp, former German vice chancellor Sigmar Gabriel, and CEO Tim Höttges of Deutsche Telekom (an advocate for more creative control in the U.S. but a more innovative spirit in Europe), Karp stated: "We can't leave the entire future to the Americans."

In 2026, Palantir summarized one of the arguments in Karp and Zamiska's Technological Republic as "The postwar neutering of Germany and Japan must be undone".

=== Business views ===
Karp is a critic of short sellers, and said he loves "burning the short sellers". He compared them to cocaine addicts and said that they "just love pulling down great American companies". In 2024, he received criticism for selling $1.9 billion of Palantir shares. In February 2025, during a talk promoting his book, he said, "I love the idea of getting a drone and having light fentanyl-laced urine spraying on analysts that tried to screw us."

=== Book on Silicon Valley ===
Karp co-authored, with Nicholas Zamiska, The Technological Republic: Hard Power, Soft Belief, and the Future of the West, published in February 2025. The book offers a critical perspective on what it deems Silicon Valley's complacency and the West's waning ambition, arguing that the software industry must partner with government to tackle urgent challenges, particularly the AI arms race.

== Personal life ==
Karp lives in Lyman, New Hampshire, and owns 11 houses around the world. In a 2024 interview he described himself as Jewish, commenting (after being asked) in another interview that while his background informed Palantir having Israel as a client, he did not believe it expressly did so. In June 2026, Süddeutsche Zeitung reported that Karp is building a house on a 6,000-square-meter plot in Schaan, Liechtenstein, and suggests that he is now a long-term resident in the country (he first moved to Liechtenstein from Switzerland on November 8, 2022), considering the privileges he has received despite Liechtenstein's very strict residental regulations. Officials have refused to discuss the issue despite press inquiries.

As of 2025, Karp is in long-term relationships with two women. He was described as "geographically monogamous".

Karp never learned to drive a car. He said, "I was too poor. And then I was too rich." He has said that the thought of having children "gives [him] hives". His uncle, Gerald Jaynes, is the A. Whitney Griswold Professor of Economics, African American Studies, and Urban Studies at Yale.

Karp is fluent in German and speaks French. According to Michael Steinberger, "No matter where [Karp] is, he still speaks German for half the day. He has Austrian assistants who are also his closest confidants — two or three of them are almost always with him. In every Palantir branch, he has his own office, and when he's there, German is often spoken."

In 2025, he received the Lamplighter award, presented to him by Rabbi Levi Shemtov.

== In media ==
Karp is the subject of the 2024 German documentary film Watching You: The World of Palantir and Alex Karp, directed by Klaus Stern, which explores Palantir's influence and Karp's career, including interviews with former colleagues, politicians, and critics; Karp chose not to participate in the documentary.
