= Tala Finance =

California-based lending company

InVenture Capital Corporation
- Trade name: Tala
- Type: Privately held company
- Industry: Financial services
- Founded: 2010; 16 years ago in California
- Founder: Shivani Siroya
- Headquarters: Santa Monica, United States
- Area served: Latin America, South East Asia and East Africa
- Products: Financial Services
- Number of employees: 733 (2025)
- Website: tala.co

Tala is an American financial infrastructure company providing credit, lending and other services to people in Latin America, Asia and East Africa.

The company is headquartered in Santa Monica, California and was founded by Shivani Siroya, who is Chief Executive Officer. Tala states that its mission is to provide financial services to individuals who lack traditional access due to the absence of a formal financial history.(also referred to as the "unbanked"). As of 2025, the company has raised $350 million from PayPal Ventures, Revolution Growth, IVP, and GV.

By 2024, the company had over 12 million customers and had disbursed over $7 billion in credit. It has offices in the United States as well as Nairobi (Kenya), Mexico City, (Mexico), Manila (Philippines) and Bangalore (India).

== History ==
Founder and CEO Shivani Siroya started the financial infrastructure company in 2011. One of her goals was to reimagine traditional credit lending based on her experience studying health and microfinance in sub-Saharan and West African countries while working for the United Nations Population Fund. After interviewing 3,500 micro-entrepreneurs, Siroya concluded that these individuals needed a pathway into a formal financial system. The company developed an Android app that leveraged alternative data to assign instant credit scores to users, the majority of whom are women.

== Business model ==
Potential clients can apply or personal loans and other financial services directly through Tala's mobile app. The company uses mobile phone data to determine risk based on activities such as phone bill payments, regular travel, and interactions with the Tala app. A credit score is then created, and approved clients receive funds directly. Loans tend to range from $10 to $500, with $50 being the average. Tala has been criticized for granting rapid access to small amounts of funds, with critics claiming that it increases impulsive debt acquisition and charges high interest rates. The repayment rate is more than 90%, although some users have reported aggressive collection tactics that have been detrimental. The company added a wallet feature to the platform in 2017 to help customers manage their expenses.

In 2024, Tala partnered with financial service regulator CONDUSEF in Mexico to promote best practices for digital financial services. The company also paired up with Bayad Center in the Philippines to provide bill payment in the app for users and became a licensed digital credit provider by the Central Bank of Kenya.

== Social impact and awards ==
As of 2025, Tala has more than 10 million clients globally, including Southeast Asia and East Africa, with more than three million clients in Mexico and 3.5 million in Kenya. In Mexico, women make up 50% of Tala’s lending portfolio. This has been both lauded as empowering the underbanked and criticized as preying on those with less access to capital.

In 2024, Tala, which is female-founded, was named one of the Greatest Workplaces for Women, according to Newsweek magazine. Other accolades include: Fortune’s Impact 20 (2020), CNBC's Disruptor 50 (2024), and Forbes’ Fintech 50 list (2025). Tala Kenya was named the Best Digital Credit Provider in Risk Management of 2025 according to Think Business.

== See also ==
- Microcredit
