= SOMPO Holdings =

Japanese insurance holdings company

SOMPO Holdings, Inc.

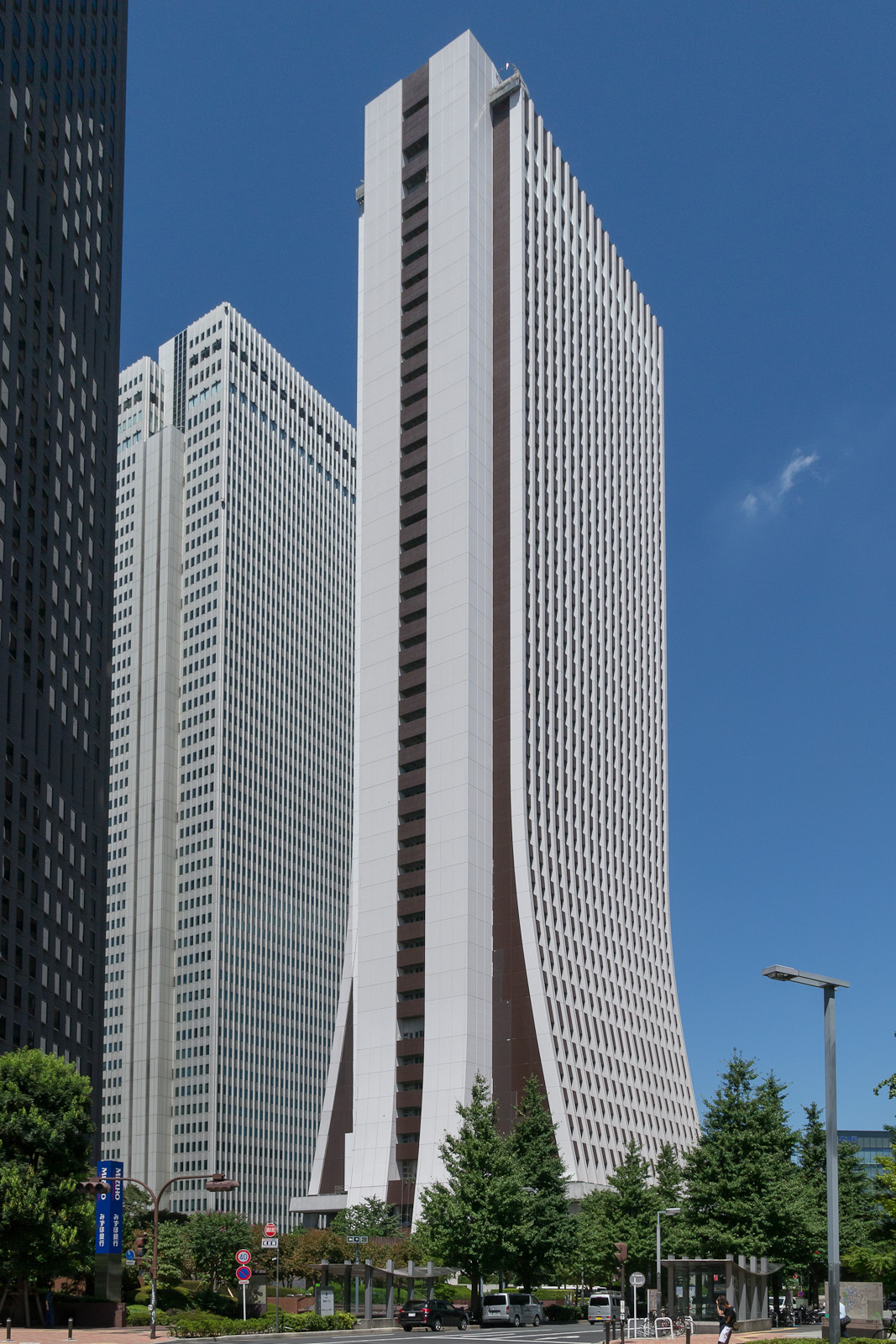
- Headquarters in Shinjuku, Tokyo
- Native name: SOMPOホールディングス株式会社
- Romanized name: SOMPO Hōrudingusu Kabushiki-kaisha
- Formerly: NKSJ Holdings, Inc. (2010-2014); Sompo Japan Nipponkoa Holdings Inc. (2014-2016)
- Type: Public (K.K)
- Traded as: TYO: 8630; Nikkei 225 component
- Founded: April 1, 2010; 16 years ago
- Headquarters: Nishi-Shinjuku, Shinjuku, Tokyo, Japan
- Key people: Mikio Okumura (CEO)
- Number of employees: 440
- Subsidiaries: Sompo Japan Nipponkoa; Sompo Direct Insurance; Capital Insurance Corporation; Sompo Himawari Life
- Website: https://www.sompo-hd.com/en/

SOMPO Holdings, Inc. (SOMPOホールディングス株式会社, SOMPO Hōrudingusu Kabushiki-kaisha) is a Japanese insurance holding company formed on April 1, 2010, from the merger of Sompo Japan with Nipponkoa Insurance. The firm is considered one of three top insurers in Japan. The company currently trades on the Tokyo Stock Exchange and is a constituent of the Nikkei 225 index.

The group’s principal subsidiaries include Sompo Japan Insurance Inc., a major domestic non-life insurer; Sompo Himawari Life Insurance Inc., its life insurance division; and Sompo International Holdings Ltd., which manages the company’s global commercial insurance and reinsurance operations. SOMPO Holdings also owns Sompo Care Inc., one of Japan’s largest elderly-care and nursing service providers.

Internationally, the company operates through subsidiaries and affiliates in Asia, Europe, and the Americas, including businesses in Singapore, Indonesia, Malaysia, Brazil, Turkey, China, and Hong Kong. SOMPO expanded its overseas presence significantly through the acquisition of Bermuda-based insurer Endurance Specialty Holdings, which was later integrated into Sompo International.

In addition to insurance operations, SOMPO Holdings is involved in risk management, healthcare services, pension administration, and asset management through subsidiaries such as Sompo Risk Management Inc. and Sompo Asset Management Co., Ltd.

== See also ==
- Sompo Japan Nipponkoa
