= Thiel Capital =

Los Angeles-based venture capital firm

- Type: Family office, investment firm, venture capital fund
- Industry: Venture capital
- Founded: 2011
- Founder: Peter Thiel
- Headquarters: Los Angeles
- Key people: Peter Thiel; Jason Camm; Jack Selby; Matt Danzeisen; Blake Masters
- Website: thielcapital.com

Thiel Capital is an American company described as a family office, venture capital firm or an investment firm, founded by Peter Thiel. In a 2023 article, Barron's described Thiel Capital as the venture capital arm of Thiel's family trust office Rivendell Trust. It was formed in 2011 and is based in Los Angeles. Thiel Capital provides "strategic and operational support" for many of Peter Thiel's initiatives and ventures. Thiel Capital has incubated several major investment firms—Founders Fund, Mithril, and Valar Ventures—as well as other business and philanthropic initiatives like the Thiel Fellowship and Breakout Labs.

== Function and history ==
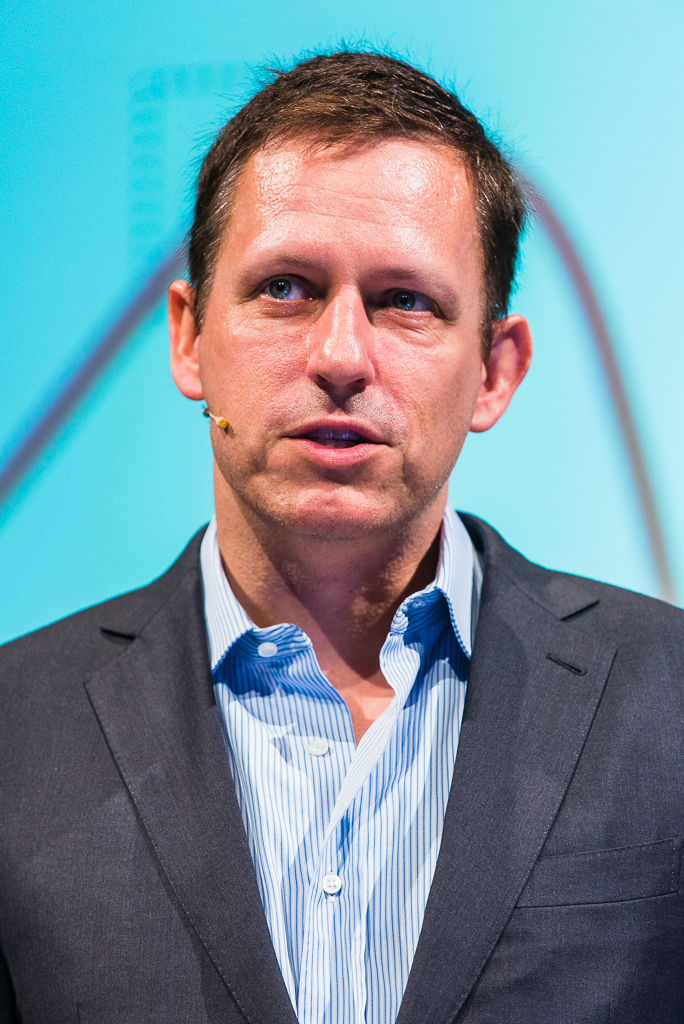
Peter Thiel in 2014

The firm should not be mistaken for Thiel Capital Management, which was founded by Peter Thiel in 1996 and was the predecessor of Clarium, which had Thiel Capital as its successor.

There is also another company named Thiel Capital (operates on the internet through websites like thiel-capital.com and thiel-capitals.com), which is banned by BaFin from conducting custody business. BaFin remarks that there is no certifiable connection between this company and Clarium Capital's Peter Andreas Thiel. Dasinvestment comments that this is likely sheer coincidence.

A registration paper involving Bridgetown Holdings Limited (whose chairman is Matt Danzeisen, the spouse of Peter Thiel) sent to the SEC states that, "Thiel Capital and its predecessors have incubated and launched several investment firms now with billions of dollars under management, including Founders Fund, Mithril and Valar Ventures. Numerous other business and philanthropic ventures, including the Thiel Fellowship and Breakout Labs, have also started under the Thiel Capital umbrella."

In a 2019 questionnaire sent to the U.S. Congress, Michael Kratsios described Founders Fund, Thiel Macro, Mithril Capital, Valar Ventures, Clarium Capital, and The Thiel Foundation as "related subsidiaries" of Thiel Capital.

Max Moran of CounterPunch and the watchdog The Revolving Door Project calls Thiel Capital the most secretive of Thiel's funds and "an enigma": "Its website is just a logo. The only public information about it comes, again, from a LinkedIn page, declaring that it 'provides strategic and operational support for Peter's many investment initiatives and entrepreneurial endeavors.' (LinkedIn, by the way, was created by a Paypal mafioso.) Another sign that Thiel Capital isn't looking for the spotlight is the name: Thiel's better-known venture capital funds are all named after Lord of the Rings references, such as the godlike Valar, or magical metal Mithril. Thiel Capital appears, then, to be a means of overseeing and managing the other, flashier pieces of the Thiel empire."

The firm reportedly has a notable role in Thiel's political activities. In 2017, Politico wrote that Rob Morrow, then a principal at the firm (and longtime associate who has worked in various Thiel firms including Clarium Capital) was Thiel's political consigliere and was consulted when Thiel considered a bid for California governorship. Thiel's biographer Max Chafkin notes, though, that although Thiel's entourage has become more structured in recent years, unlike other billionaires, he never has a real political team or an adviser who directs activities on his behalf. Instead, his investment firm Thiel Capital and other friends and associates form an inner circle that is similar to the court of a king.

Describing his job with Thiel and Thiel Capital, Jack Selby said that "the nest is very important".

It was one of the most active family offices in venture capital worldwide in 2024 (tied for sixth, by the number of deals: 14) .

== Investments and business activities ==
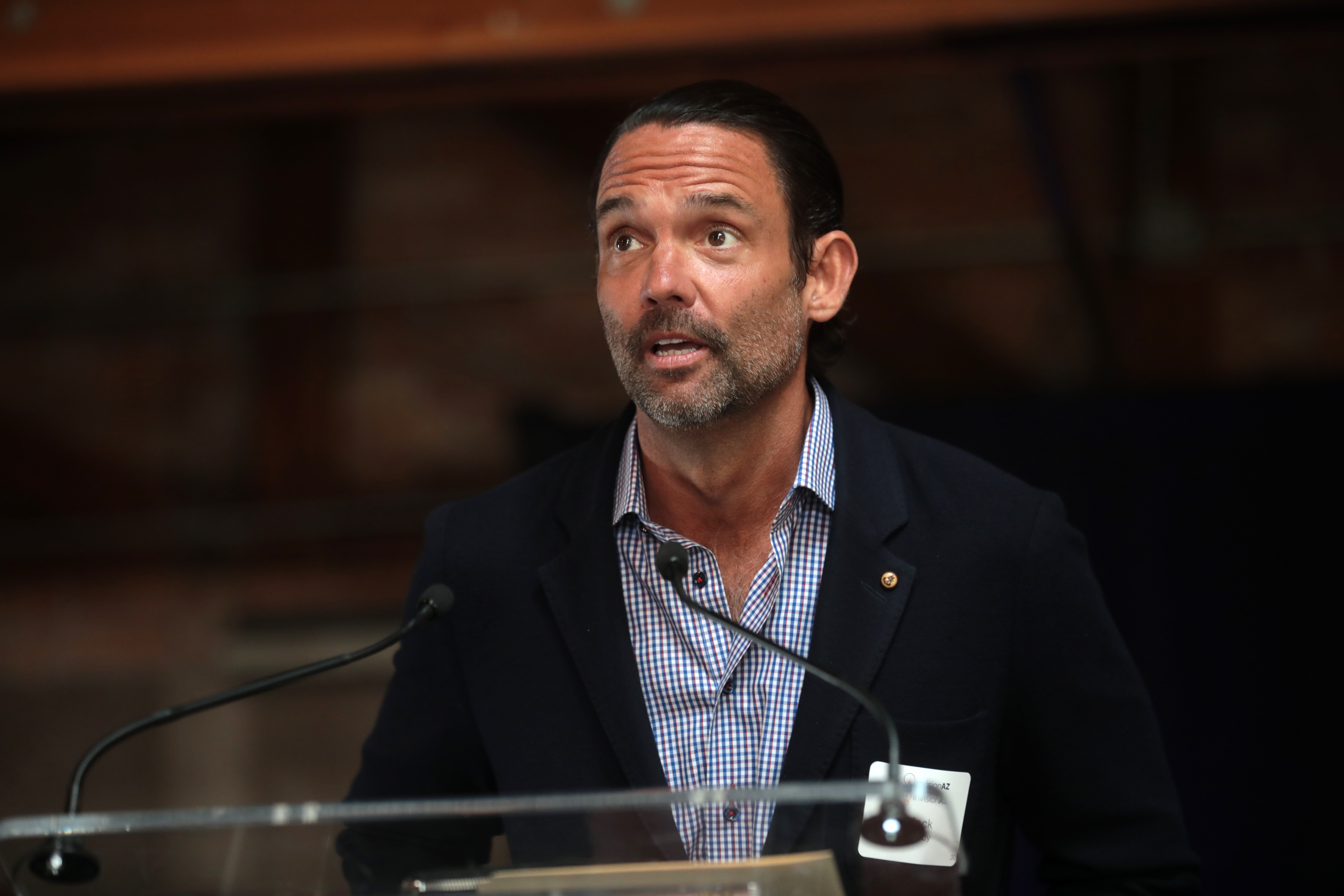
Jack Selby in 2019

The firm's investments include:

- Bio- and med-tech:
  - Alloy Therapeutics: startup developing a line of "humanized" mice to support antibody discovery. The startup's investors include not only Thiel Capital, but also the Founders Fund, and 8VC which Thiel invests in.
  - EnClear Therapies: biotechnology company advancing device-based therapeutic solutions for neurodegenerative disorders. Jason Camm became a board member in 2020.
  - ATAI Life Sciences: German unicorn found by Thiel's friend, the biotech billionaire Christian Angermayer.
  - Compass Pathways: also partly owned by ATAI.
  - Peptilogics: A clinical-stage biotechnology company developing innovative surgical therapeutics to prevent and treat medical device infections. The company is also backed by Founders Fund and Thiel Bio. Jason Camm and Hannes Holste are on the board.
  - ChemomAb: Israel-based company developing treatment for inflammatory and fibrotic diseases.
  - Rational Vaccines: herpes vaccine company that carried out secret trials in Saint Kitts. Thiel Capital and the Founders Fund backed the company. The company was led by Bill Halford, professor at Southern Illinois University, who at the time had a fatal illness and felt that he could not wait for the government's approval. The company was criticized for violating ethical norms and FDA's rules. Supporters said that the 17 people injected with the vaccine already had herpes so risks were minimal; the current rules and processes were too burdensome so companies had to search for ways to speed up the development of drugs. The State Journal Register said that the affair led to development of proposals that could change the current drug-development system drastically including making new treatments accessible as much as seven years earlier. Jim O'Neill was an advisor for the company.
  - 3T Biosciences: T-Cell therapy startup that develop solutions strengthening the immune system to fight cancer. Thiel Capital co-led a $12 million round with Sean Parker in 2017.
  - SPARK Neuro: neuroanalytics company, which tracks brain activities and emotional responses. Thiel Capital led the $13.5 million Series A.
- Femtech
  - Hugoboom: startup which launches the controversial app 28.
  - Rhea: Singaporean fertility clinic incubated by Recharge Capital. Thiel Capital provided early funding.
- Defense, aerospace and dual use:
  - Pilgrim: startup founded by Thiel Fellow Jake Adler, the startup creates solutions for nanoparticle-enabled vaccines and applications in defense. Among its products is Kingsfoil (a wound-stopping hemostatic dressing; name comes from Tolkien's). The investment is noted for the fact the founder cut open his leg to dress the wound on camera. Thiel backs the seed round together with Cantos and others.
  - Rollup: software platform to develop complex hardware for aerospace and defense. In 2024, when the startup emerged from stealth, Thiel Capital and Andreessen Horowitz co-led the $5.6 million funding round. The founder, Mickels, worked at Varda Space Industries.
  - Advano: dual-use battery materials company. Thiel Capital joined the Series A.
  - AngieX: startup that develops nuclear-delivered cancer therapy. Its AGX101, an antibody that aims at treatment of solid cancers, has passed FDA and entered clinical trial. It collaborates closely with U.S. National Laboratories and ISS National Laboratory to develop drugs in space. The research was funded by U.S. Department of Defense (DoD)'s Congressionally Directed Medical Research Programs (CDMRP). Thiel Capital is known as an investor. Founder Paul Jaminet said Peter Thiel was the first investor (as angel), who invested in the company since the seed round. The website of the startup says Angermayer's Presight Capital led Series B with Thiel's participation. Jason Camm is on the board.
  - Kodex: govtech company that serves the DoD. The company advertises itself as "leading food safety and industrial X-ray inspection systems". According to Bloomberg News, it does data request and partners with Flock Safety (backed by Founders Fund). The company also manufactures hardware, like weapons detectors, computed radiography system, aircraft maintenance and repair shop specialized equipment. Thiel Capital is among its seed backers alongside a16z, GovTech Fund, Sound Ventures and others.
  - Neros: found by Thiel Fellow Soren Monroe-Anderson. The company's supply chain eliminates Chinese components, resulting in it becoming "one of just two U.S. FPV drone makers approved by the Defense Innovation Unit" and being sanctioned by Beijing. It is also backed by the Founders Fund. It allies with Quantum-Systems (backed by Thiel through Thiel Capital), which makes the carrier drone Radiant, which can launch Neros's Archer.
  - Mynaric: Thiel Capital is an investor (including post-IPO financial investment as major backer) of the dual-use German laser communications startup Mynaric. Angermayer also backs Mynaric.
  - Regent Craft: electric seaglider startup (invested together with Founders Fund).
  - Quantum-Systems
  - Stark
  - Panthalassa: In May 2026, Thiel led a $140 million Series B for the ocean technology company through Thiel Capital. Founders Fund had invested in the company before that. The startup builds floating data centers powered by wave energy.
- Semiconductor:
  - Etched: startup that makes inference chips for LLMs, founded by three Thiel Fellows. It is valued at $21bn and shipped its first hardware rack in July 2026.
- Cryptocurrency and fintech
  - Bullish Global: It was spun out of Block.one with initial capital from Thiel Capital, Founders Fund and others including Angermayer, Mike Novogratz.
  - FTX: also received investment from Rivendell LLC.
  - Nextmarkets – a data analytics platform for investing, based in Cologne. The Founders Fund also invested in 2016.
  - SoFi: fintech company that offers a wide range of financial services. Thiel was one of the largest backers through Thiel Capital.
  - Kreditech: Hamburg-based fintech startup. Thiel Capital invested in its $40 million funding round in 2015. The startup met troubles with overextension, problematic algorithm and finally went down during Covid.
- Software
  - QA Wolf
  - Zest AI: lending fintech platform. Thiel Capital invested $20M in the company in 2013.
- Entertainment
  - Legendary Entertainment: invested alongside Eric Schmidt’s Tomorrow Ventures and Morgan Stanley Investment Management.
- Chess
  - Take Take Take: chess startup that aims to make chess a spectator sport. Thiel's approval was key to the startup's development. The two founders, Magnus Carlsen and Mats André Kristiansen, came to know Thiel through SNÖ Ventures. Thiel initially refused to support but was persuaded after Carlsen and Kristiansen took 45 minutes to explain to him at his house.
- Pet food
  - Wild Earth: vegan high-protein pet food startup. Thiel Capital invests alongside the Founders Fund.

Thiel Capital acts as the main gateway in many of Thiel's business initiatives in Asia-Pacific. The firm have sponsored Bridgetown 1, 2, 3 (all with Matt Danzeisen as chairman). It also sponsors Korea-based Crescendo Equity Partners (founded by Matt Danzeisen, Peter Thiel and others), which by 2020 had invested over $550 million across South Korea and Southeast Asia.

In 2014, Thiel Capital set up a venture fund together with Korea Development Bank (KDB). Business Korea saw the move as signalling the interest of the PayPal Mafia in the country, as it was followed by the move of Dave McClure and his firm 500 Startups, associated with former PayPal employees and founders, to invest in Korea.

In 2023, Thiel backed Singapore- and New York-based based Recharge Capital's new $200m women's healthcare fund Women's Healthcare Investment Vehicle through Thiel Capital.

=== Thiel Macro ===
Thiel Macro is a hedge fund that has held shares of Tesla, Microsoft and Apple. At the end of 2017, it took a large position tied to a rise in the Cboe Volatility Index (VIX). Gizmodo notes that Thiel Capital and Thiel Macro seem to be intertwined, as they share the same address and Kevin Harrington worked for both organizations. Another notable former employee is Curt Mills, who is now the executive director of The American Conservative.

In late 2025, Thiel Macro sold off its entire position in NVIDIA worth ~$100 million amid ongoing concerns an AI bubble was forming.

=== Haymaker Ventures ===
Haymaker Ventures, a venture firm focused on fintech and early stage startups, was spun out of Thiel Capital. Danzeisen serves as head of the investment advisory committee of Haymaker Ventures, while his former working partner at Thiel Capital, Phin Upham, is a managing partner. The company has invested in Latin countries. The fund is anchored by Peter Thiel's investment. Haymaker Growth (providing checks of $25-75 million per deal) is its growth investment strategy platform, created on the basis of a partnership between Thiel Capital and CDPQ.

=== Quantum-Systems and Stark ===
In October 2022, Peter Thiel invested in the Gilching-based surveillance drone startup Quantum-Systems founded by the former Bundeswehr officer Florian Seibel, through Thiel Capital. His involvement with the company, as well as his subsequent backing of the Berlin-based attack drone startup Stark, also found by Seibel (a new company needed to be found because some of Quantum Systems' investors were not allowed to invest in weaponized drones), are sometimes considered controversial, due to Thiel's politics. Seibel said he knew about Thiel's politics, explaining "I do not share political views with him but selected him in 2021 for his network into tech and being one of the most successful investors worldwide." The firm also hoped to gain access to the U.S. military expertise through Thiel's investment. In May 2025, Quantum Systems became Europe's first dual-use unicorn and third defense unicorn, after fellow Bavarian startup Helsing and the Portuguese Tekever (Thiel has a role in the success of Helsing too and the startup is considered a part of the "Thiel ecosystem", although he does not directly invest in it). Thiel's mentee Moritz Döpfner brokered the deal with Quantum Systems on Thiel's behalf and sits on its board. His venture fund Doepfner Capital also invests in Stark.

== Personnel ==
In 2018, when Thiel moved from San Francisco to Los Angeles, Thiel Capital's and Thiel Foundation's headquarters were relocated to Los Angeles, too. It was noted that there were 50 employees who made up the two organizations at the time and also followed Thiel to Los Angeles.

Matt Danzeisen is head of private investments, focusing on the U.S. and Asia. Other than his job at Thiel Capital and Haymaker Ventures, Crescendo and Bridgetown, he serves on the boards of companies like iText and Coru Holdings, a personal financial management platform which he and Thiel were among largest owners. Since 2021, Thiel Capital is a shareholder in Malta-based EUM, which Thiel, Danzeisen, Richard Li and investors from Coru established. He married Thiel in October 2017.

Jason Camm is the former chief medical officer of Thiel Capital, founder of the newly founded biotech fund Thiel Bio, and CEO of pharma company Beren.

Hannes Holste was Thiel Capital's director of life science and is a partner at Thiel Bio.

Jack Selby is a managing director. When at PayPal, he was vice president for business and corporate development. He is considered part of the PayPal Mafia. Later he co-founded Clarium Capital with Thiel. As managing director of Thiel Capital, he is also on the Global Advisor Board of data analytics firm Presight (subsidiary of the UAE's G42), which governs the Presight–Shorooq Fund. He is also the founder of AZ-VC (formerly invisionAZ Fund), which focuses on Arizona and described as "the largest venture capital fund in the state’s history". He deliberately seeks backing from Arizona's real estate firms, and not from Thiel, Thiel Capital or the firm's partners, saying "With my day job with Peter, and I say this very humbly, but I basically know every LP that allocates venture capital in the world, whether they’re here in Abu Dhabi or Tokyo or New York or wherever it is. They all know who we are, and they would love to curry favor with him by giving money to some new fund that’s connected to Peter’s universe. But I wanted to use the fund as a litmus test to see if the Arizona community wanted to see something like this fund rise up and get off the ground." Selby participated in movie production, such as the case of Act of Valor.

Michael Gibson was hired in 2010 to help Thiel teach a course at Stanford, but soon became involved in leading the Thiel Foundation and helped launch the Thiel Fellowship, through which he supported Figma, Inc. and Ethereum. His position at Thiel Capital was principal. Later he left with his co-director (also Thiel Fellowship's co-founder) Danielle Strachmann to found 1517 Fund.

Eric Weinstein was a managing director at Thiel Capital.

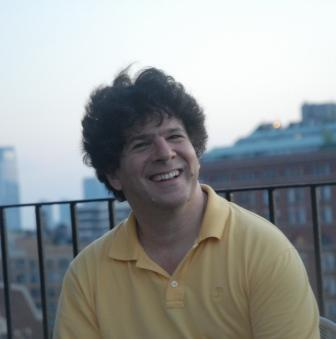
Eric Weinstein, former managing director of Thiel Capital

Some of Thiel Capital's (former and current) employees are also notable for their political activities, which are sometimes considered controversial.

In early 2022, Sebastian Kurz, who had just resigned from his office as Chancellor of Austria following instability in the coalition and corruption allegations, began his work as a global strategist for Thiel Capital. A report by the politician Sophie in 't Veld, the rapporteur for the EU Committee of Inquiry (that investigated the use of the software Pegasus created by the firm of the same name, found by the Israeli entrepreneur Shalev Hulio), notes that, "The cooperation between Kurz and Hulio constitutes an indirect but alarming connection between the spyware industry and Peter Thiel and his firm Palantir."

Thiel Capital's former COO, Blake Masters, was a U.S. Congress candidate from Arizona. He resigned from Thiel Capital in 2022. Thiel supported Masters' campaign with $15 million, but the campaign did not succeed.

Kevin Harrington and Michael Kratsios were both former employees of Thiel Capital. The two senior White House officials attended the 2025 Bilderberg Meeting alongside Peter Thiel.

Jim O'Neill, now U.S. Deputy Secretary of Health and Human Services, is a former managing director at Thiel Capital. He had previously worked for Clarium.

Tristan Abbey is a former Clarium Capital, Thiel Capital and Founders Fund employee, currently 11th administrator of the U.S. Energy Information Administration. He had also been an editor at The Stanford Review (graduated 2008).

Moritz Döpfner was Thiel's former chief-of-staff and worked for Thiel Capital. Thiel is the anchor investor in Döpfner's firm Doepfner Capital. Thiel's and Palantir's business and political connections with the Döpfner family in general attract a lot of attention in Germany.

Charles Vaughan is a former chief-of-staff. Around 2021, he was involved with the controversies at the Faculty of Divinity, University of Cambridge. It was alleged that he helped to recruit conservative or right-wing academics at Cambridge to build an "anti-woke" network on behalf of Thiel, with some allegations being based on the connection between Thiel and Curtis Yarvin regarding their opinions on race (Max Chafkin remarks that while Thiel and Yarvin overlap in many areas, opinions on race are not one of them). The conservative side claimed that they promoted free speech.
