= Matt Danzeisen =

American financier and investor

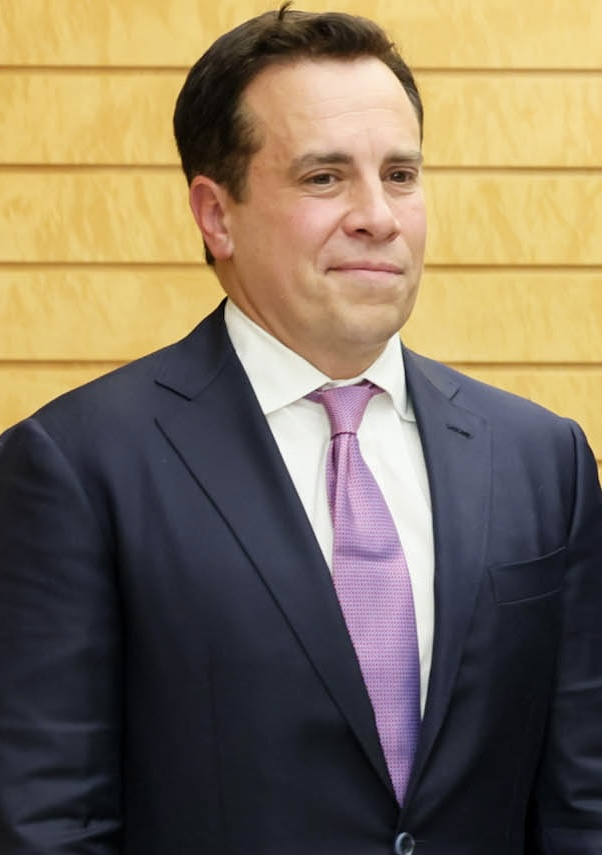
- Danzeisen in 2026
- Born: Charles Matthew Danzeisen c. 1977 (age 48–49)
- Education: Cornell University
- Occupations: Financier, investor
- Known for: Portfolio manager at Thiel Capital; Co-founder of Crescendo Equity Partners
- Spouse: Peter Thiel (m. 2017)

Charles Matthew Danzeisen (born c. 1977) is an American financier and investor. He was vice president of BlackRock before becoming portfolio manager at Thiel Capital in 2008. He is active in Asia and Asia-Pacific. Danzeisen is co-founder of Crescendo Equity Partners. In 2017, he married Peter Thiel.

== Early life ==
In 2026, Blick reported his age to be 49. Danzeisen graduated from the Cornell University School of Hotel Administration in 1999. Omni förklarar reports that he was born between 1969 and 1973. He holds a degree in finance with a minor in economics from Cornell University and is also a CFA charterholder.

== Career ==
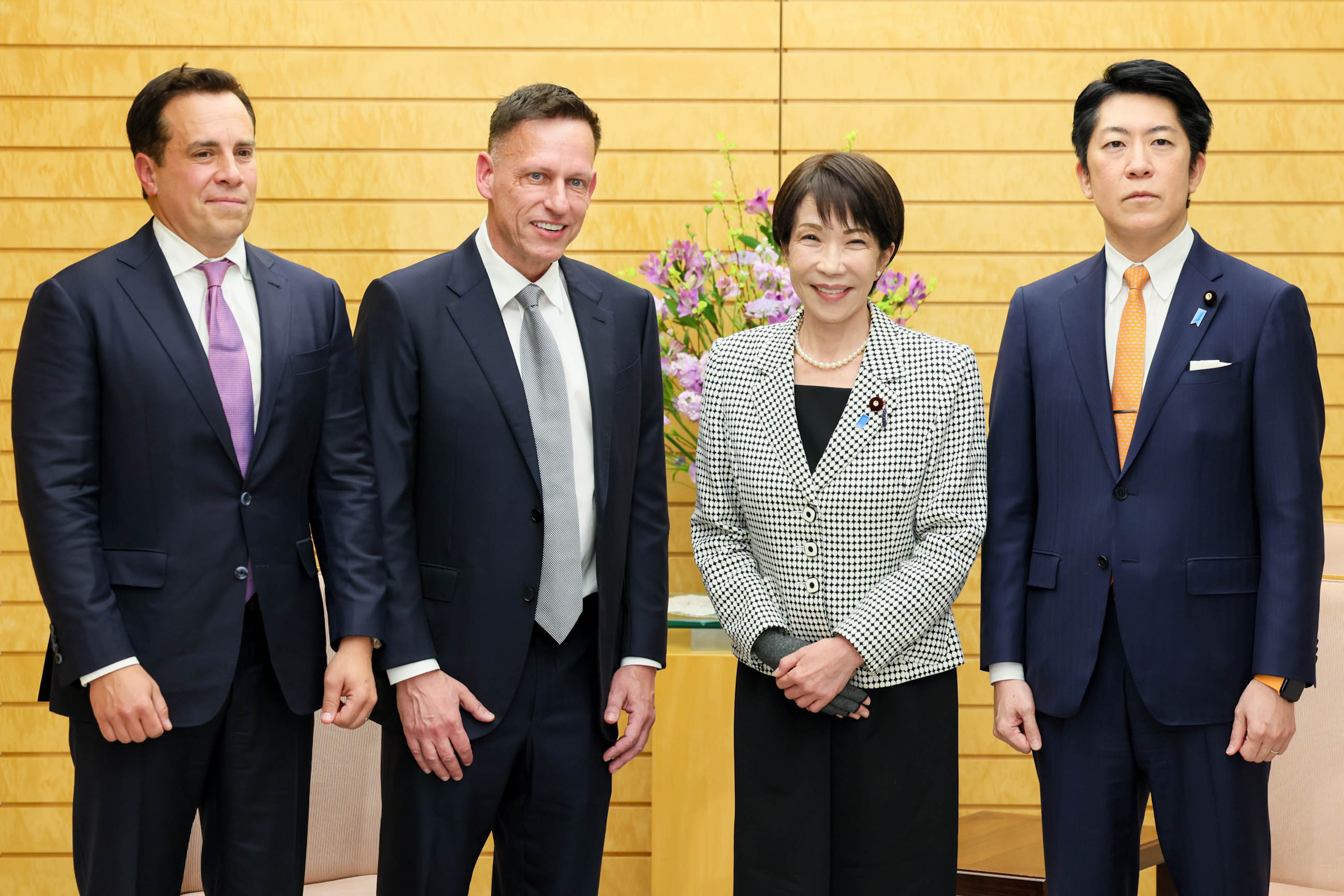
Danzeisen (left), with Peter Thiel, Japanese prime minister Sanae Takaichi and deputy chief cabinet secretary Kei Satō, March 5, 2026

He served as an investment banker at Bank of America Securities Asia Ltd. from 2000 to 2001 and vice president at BlackRock from 2002 to 2008.

When he and Thiel started dating around 2007, he was based in New York, where Thiel had a house. Gawker reported in 2008 that he worked for BlackRock Securities. In 2007, Thiel considered moving Clarium (Thiel Capital's predecessor) to New York, but discarded the plan. Instead, Danzeisen left his job at BlackRock and joined Clarium Capital and Thiel Capital in 2008.

His official position at Thiel Capital is portfolio manager and head of private investments, focusing on the U.S. and Asia. According to Handelsblatt, in practice, he co-manages Thiel Capital with Thiel.

His key role for the firm and in the Silicon Valley investment industry are exemplified by various trips to Asia and Asia-Pacific. On trips in 2014 and subsequently, he both represented Thiel Capital and headed up Thiel Capital-led business groupings in their meetings with political and business leaders. In 2018, he visited Tashkent, Uzbekistan—with a delegation consisting of representatives from Thiel Capital, Thundermark Capital, and several Silicon Valley- and South Korean-based companies affiliated with them—to discuss the development of IT exports with the country's Ministry of Finance. On that occasion, Anhor (also known as anhor.uz) reported that, "Matt Danzeisen is a portfolio manager at the international investment fund Thiel Capital [...] He specializes in private investments and is responsible for the financial services sector at the company. Matt Danzeisen oversees equity investments in the US, Europe, and Australia. He manages two funds in Japan and South Korea." Uzreport describes him as "a specialist in attracting private investment".

In 2025, in Japan, he led a group of "venture capital investors from the U.S., South Korea and Singapore", accompanied by the host country's Dentsu's president and CFO, to the Osaka-Kansai World Expo, where he met with U.S. ambassador William E. Grayson and a senior advisor to the Saudi royal family. On that trip, he emphasized Asian advantage in hardware and the need to develop AI to modernize Japan.

Seoul-based Crescendo Equity is a private equity firm which focuses on mid-cap manufacturing and technology companies in Asia, sponsored by Thiel Capital, and co-founded in 2012 by Danzeisen (who serves as a member of its investment committee and representative to selected portfolio companies; Korean thebell refers to Danzeisen's position as director), Thiel and others. The fund invests in Line Next (a unit of the Line Corporation), a joint venture between Softbank and Naver. Crescendo is notable for investments in semiconductor companies such as HPSP (often dubbed Korea's ASML), Hanmi Semiconductor, Samyang NCchem, and Movensys (originally known as Soft Servo Group or Soft Motions & Robotics; the name was changed to Movensys in 2021 after Crescendo's investment). The firm also invests in companies that make metal equipment, including Seojin System and Model Solution. By 2020, Crescendo had invested over $550 million across South Korea and Southeast Asia.

In 2014, in a ceremony in which Danzeisen represented Thiel Capital, it was announced that Thiel Capital and Singapore-based Octave Capital would establish a joint venture in the Americas to help Korean firms, with the support of KDB Industrial Bank and IBK Industrial Bank of Korea. Hong Kong-based Excelsior Capital was selected as the sub-fund manager. Various companies with the Octave brand are associated with Peter Thiel, Thiel Capital, and Crescendo.

Danzeisen has been chairman of the SPAC companies Bridgetown Holdings, Bridgetown 2 Holdings, and Bridgetown 3 Holdings, which were sponsored by Thiel Capital and Richard Li's Pacific Century. The first Bridgetown merged with Hong Kong- and Singapore-based fintech company MoneyHero in 2023. MoneyHero is described by TechNode as "one of Greater Southeast Asia's largest personal finance tech and data platforms, with over 270 commercial partner relationships as at June 30, 2025 and 5.3 million monthly unique users across Singapore, Hong Kong, Taiwan, and the Philippines for the three months ended 30 June 2025." In 2022, Bridgetown 2 merged with PropertyGuru, a proptech startup described as Southeast Asia's largest real estate platform and operating in Singapore, Thailand, Malaysia, Vietnam and Indonesia.

Around the time Thiel was lobbying the New Zealand government for citizenship (he received citizenship in 2011), Thiel-founded Valar Ventures began activities in New Zealand. Thiel entrusted operations of Valar to what his biographer Max Chafkin called "a team of loyalists", led by Danzeisen (then principal at Clarium), Andrew McCormack, and James Fitzgerald. These three sat on the board of Thiel's companies in New Zealand, Second Star Limited, and Silverarc Advisors. In 2021, through Second Star Limited (which the couple co-owned), Danzeisen and Thiel applied for a permit to build a bunker-like mansion near Lake Wanaka; their application was declined. Later, Thiel wound down his business interests in New Zealand and Valar's operations in the country ceased. There have been debates about Thiel's intentions regarding New Zealand: Chafkin doubts that he was serious with the country from the start (hence why Danzeisen and others were tasked with leading Valar without an official team).

In 2022, during the time Thiel was trying to obtain Maltese citizenship, Thiel, Danzeisen, and others set up a company named EUM Holdings Melite Ltd in Malta. The New York Times remarks that the process was "a series of Byzantine events", which involved Coru, a Mexican financial-advice startup with a London parent. Entities controlled by Thiel and Danzeisen were among Coru’s largest investors, but after the company failed to secure new funding in late 2020, it entered administration. Thiel, Danzeisen, and several other Coru investors then created EUM, which bought Coru’s shares for about $100,000. Maltese government records list Thiel and Danzeisen as residing at a Valletta apartment, but when a Times reporter visited, a tourist staying there via a short-term rental answered the door. The Times also found an Airbnb listing for a "2BR oceanfront executive penthouse" using the same address. According to The New York Times, lawyers and immigration experts say Maltese citizenship offers Thiel no clear tax benefit, though wealthy individuals from countries like Saudi Arabia, Russia, and China often seek it for EU access and as a safeguard against political or social instability at home.

== Personal life ==
Danzeisen married Peter Thiel, who is described as his best friend, in 2017. The wedding happened in Vienna, Austria, on Thiel's 50th birthday (October 2017), when he was reported to have proposed to Danzeisen. The guests had only been informed that they would attend a birthday party but were surprised at the announcement that it would be a wedding ceremony. Despite media reports coming from the U.S. about the wedding, Austrian media at the time doubted that they married in Austria, because contemporary Austrian law did not allow same-sex marriage (same-sex marriage only became legal in Austria on 1 January 2019).

In 2017, after Thiel began to support Trump, Danzeisen also declared (among the couple's circles) his support for the Republican candidate, although reportedly with a much more reserved attitude than his partner. In 2023, in an interview with the Atlantic, Thiel noted that Danzeisen had tried to dissuade him from donating money to Republicans.

Danzeisen is known for being private. By the time he married Thiel, little was known about him beyond his position at Thiel Capital, his moderate support for Trump, and his speech on fintech at a 2017 conference in Japan. Mediaflux noted in 2022 that while it was known that Danzeisen was prominent in business and had invested in fintech, the details of his portfolio were not disclosed. When the Enhanced Games was launched in Las Vegas in 2025, Danzeisen participated together with a delegation from Thiel Capital and a security detail, but they were so discreet that a Wired reporter did not realize that they were there until being told afterwards.

According to Max Chafkin, the couple tends to keep distance from each other in public and are rarely seen standing together or holding hands, with Thiel treating Danzeisen like his other employees. According to a 2022 Financial Times article, as Thiel had a fascination with challenging conventional thinking, dinners at the home the couple shared with their daughter typically involved "three and a half hours debating the strangest things" like "if there was an alien invasion, how would you reach diplomatic common ground?" The couple are parents of up to four children, although sources differ.

In 2022, the couple made news when they arrived in Romania, where they were followed by paparazzi. They attended the Halloween party at Bran Castle and were seen walking to a restaurant in central Brașov. Veridica reports that Thiel and Danzeisen actually organized the party, which was also attended by Ken Howery. According to The New York Times, Howery was the host.

Sam Altman has also served with Danzeisen on the board of the Bridgetown companies. Like Danzeisen, he was mentioned as a friend in Thiel's circle by BuzzFeed News in 2017. He has thanked Danzeisen for contributing to his essays on development of AI and China. It was at a birthday party which Thiel organized for Danzeisen in 2023 that Thiel warned Altman that half of Altman's subordinates at OpenAI, who had supposedly been "programmed" by Eliezer Yudkowsky, wanted to remove Altman. Altman was fired on 17 November of that year, but rehired in the same month, and reinstated as CEO in March 2024.

== See also ==
- Jeff Thomas (model)
