= Syfe =

Singapore-based digital wealth management platform

- Type: Financial Technology
- Founder: Dhruv Arora
- Headquarters: Singapore
- AUM: ▲US$10 billion
- Website: syfe.com

Syfe is a Singapore-based digital wealth management platform that offers robo-advisory services, brokerage, and cash management solutions. It is backed by Peter Thiel's, Valar Ventures.

== History ==
Founded by Dhruv Arora in 2017 and launched in July 2019, the company is licensed by the Monetary Authority of Singapore and operates in Singapore, Hong Kong, and Australia. In 2024, it was named among Fortune's Fintech Innovators Asia.

In 2025, Syfe raised US$53 million in series C funding from Peter Thiel's Valar Ventures. In the same year, the company reported $10billion in assets under management. It acquired Selfwealth in April 2025 for A$65 million.
