= Quantum Systems =

German technology company

Quantum-Systems GmbH
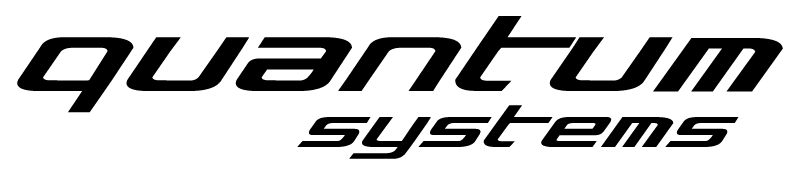

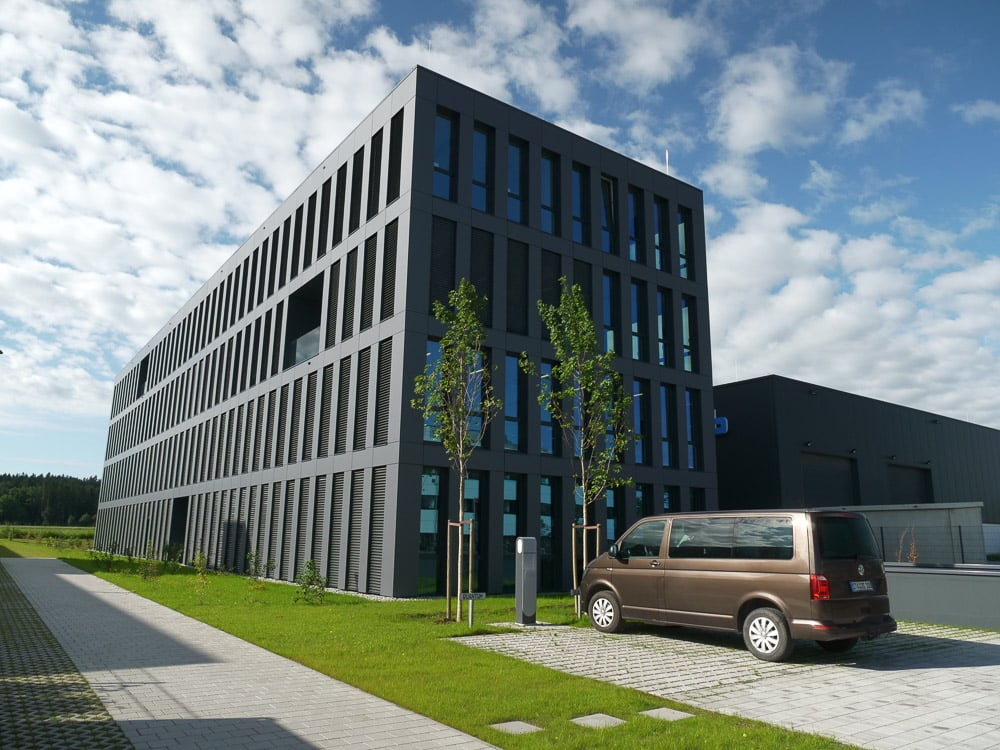
- Type: Gesellschaft mit beschränkter Haftung
- Industry: Technology; VTOL; 3D reconstruction; Surveillance; Agriculture
- Founded: 2015; 11 years ago
- Headquarters: Gilching/Munich, Germany
- Key people: Florian Seibel (CEO)
- Products: Unmanned aerial vehicle; Mission planning software
- Website: www.quantum-systems.com

Quantum-Systems GmbH is a German technology company headquartered in Gilching. Quantum-Systems was founded in 2015 by Florian Seibel. The company specializes in the development, design and production of small unmanned airal vehicles (UAVs). Originally, the company focused on UAVs used in agriculture. Later and katalysed by the start of the 2022 Russian invasion of Ukraine, Quantum developed dual use UAVs and shifted the focus to defences UAVs systems like reconnaissance and interceptor drones. In 2025 founder Seibel launched the spin-of Stark Defence producing armed combat UAVs. Both are praised by German defence policymakers as a fast-growing defence start-ups with an German in-house production of military UAVs. The company challenges traditional dominant defense companies.

The high price of Quantum UAVs, as well as the influence of U.S. tech billionaire Peter Thiel, who is an investor in Quantum Systems and thereby exerts influence over German security systems, are viewed critically.

== History ==
The company was founded by former Bundeswehr officer Florian Seibel in January 2015. Seibel, a former military helicopter pilot and aerospace researcher at the University of the Bundeswehr Munich, initially aimed to create small UAVs for civilian use. After patenting a UAV prototype with a colleague, he left his PhD work and founded the start-up Quantum-Systems in January 2015.

It is backed by investors including HV Capital, DTCP, Thiel Capital, Project A, Airbus Ventures, Omnes Capital, and ScaleUp Fonds Bayern. In May 2025, Quantum Systems became Europe's first dual-use unicorn and third defense unicorn, after fellow Bavarian startup Helsing and the Portuguese Tekever.

In early 2024, together with his co-CEO at Quantum, Sven Kruck, and other entrepreneurs, he launched the company Stark Defence. Stark Defence ist developing and producing combat UAVs. The statutes of many early investors prohibited the development of lethal weapons at Quantum Systems, originally a civilian start-up focused on agriculture and cartography. Consequently, Seibel spun off the business involving armed, one-way drones into a separate company called Stark Defence.

In July 2026, Quantum completed a new fundraising of $1.2 billion, setting a valuation of $8 billion.

In late October 2026, attackers breached Quantum Systems’ servers and planted malicious software. This malware was intended to be transmitted to customers’ drones via regular system updates, with the goal of rendering them temporarily unusable. According to the company, it is working closely with the BfV, the military counterintelligence service MAD, and the BSI to identify the perpetrators. Assessments from within security circles suggest a likely Russian connection.

In response to the incident, German Bundeswehr took its Quantum UAVs out of service for several days in early November 2026 as a precautionary measure. Consequently, an ongoing Bundeswehr exercise had to proceed without these systems. Critics view this as a cautionary tale regarding the vulnerability of networked, software-based defense equipment.

== Quantum Products ==
=== Tron Series ===
The Tron was the first electric vertical take-off and landing (eVTOL) fixed-wing unmanned aerial system (UAS) developed by Quantum-Systems, released in March 2017. The Tron can carry payloads and sensors weighting up to 2 kg.

=== Trinity Series ===
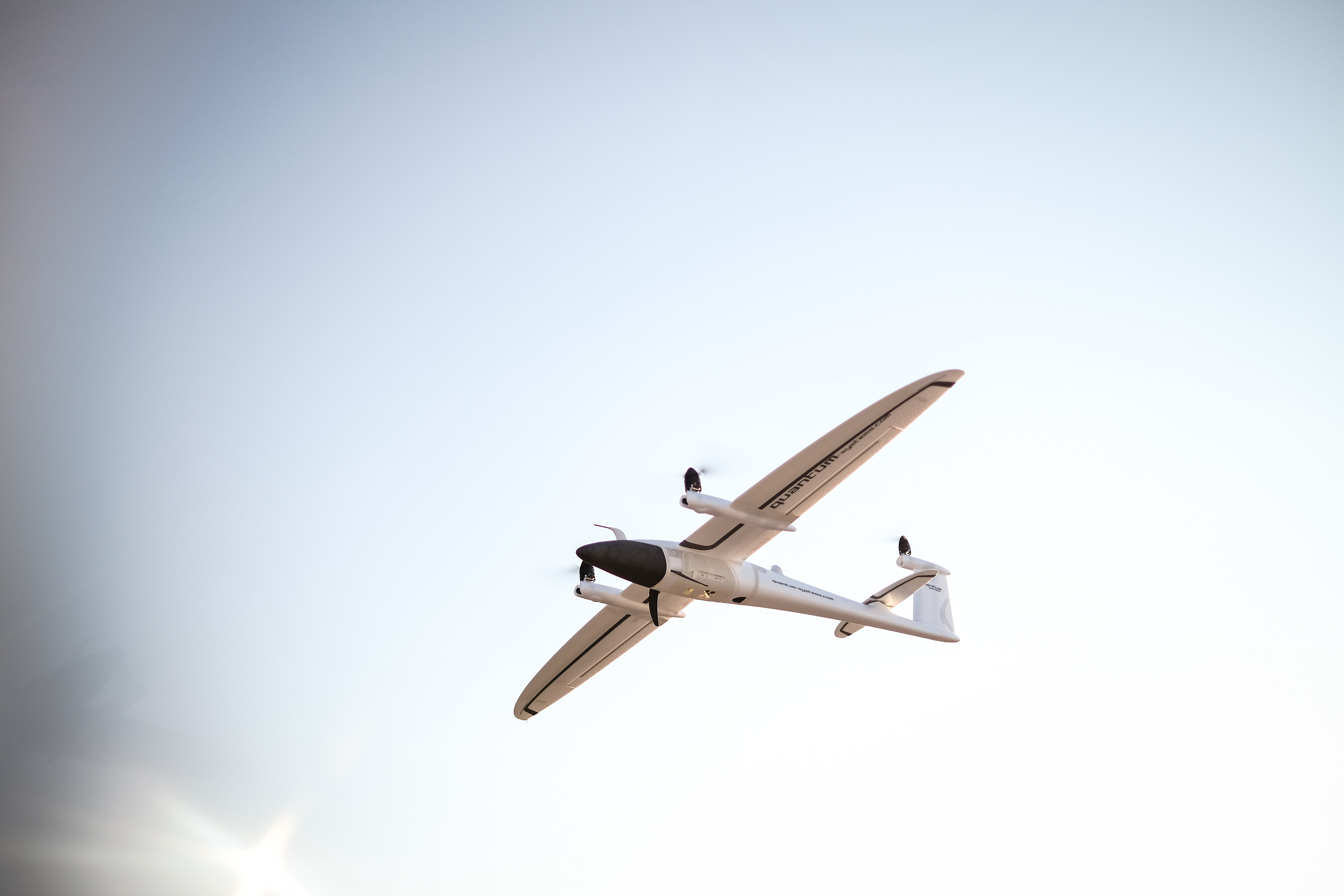
Quantum-Systems GmbH Trinity F90+ UAV

The first Trinity prototype flew in 2016, with production starting in 2018. As Quantum-Systems' flagship UAV, it has three VTOL pitch-shift propellers, a foam fuselage, and modular payload systems supporting up to 700g.

It was mainly used for land surveying and mapping in agriculture and construction across several countries, including Germany, Indonesia, Ghana, the US, and later Ukraine, where it was also deployed in Chernobyl.

While the Vector UAV is sold only to governments, Trinity offers both commercial and tactical models. The F90+ is a mapping drone with up to 90 minutes of flight time.

=== Vector & Scorpion Series ===
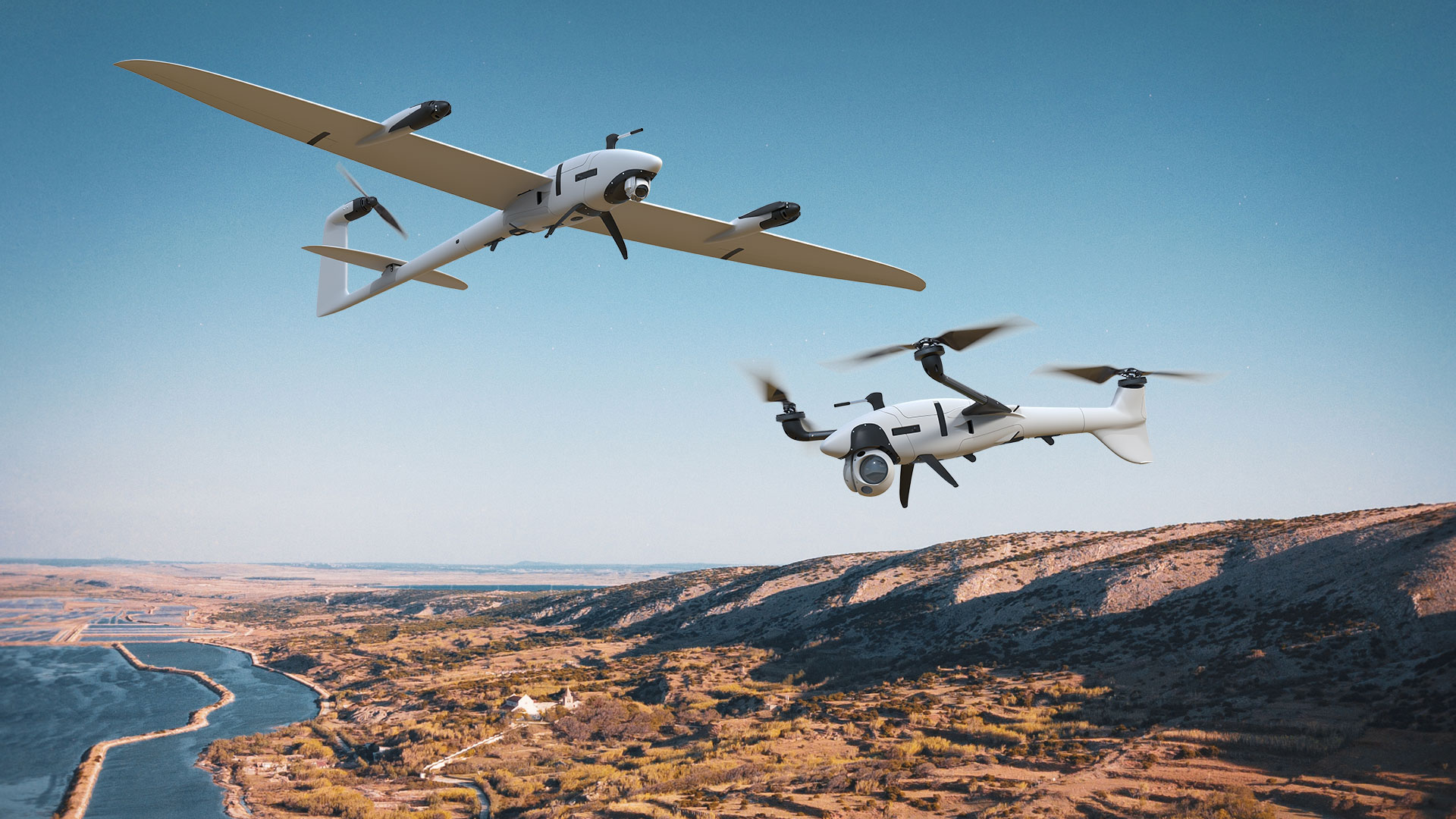
Quantum-Systems GmbH Vector & Scorpion UAS

In September 2020, Quantum-Systems partnered with Auterion to develop a tactical UAV designed for portability and field deployment. The Vector UAVs relulted of this co-operation.

=== Sparta ===
Sparta is a mothership drone project. It is described as a drone carrier developed for Ukraine. Weighing 8 kg (17.6 lb), the platform supports a maximum takeoff weight of 23 kg (51 lb), with a 200 km (124 mi) range and 6–8 hours of flight time.

Following initial flight tests in the summer of 2025, which included the successful aerial deployment of FPV drones, the project was further developed in 2026 to reach TRL 5 - testing under conditions representative of an operational environment - for the Ukrainian Armed Forces.

=== Reliant ===
The Reliant is Quantum Systems' largest long-range intelligence, surveillance, and reconnaissance (ISR) drone; it features vertical take-off and landing (VTOL) capabilities and is designed for missions lasting over 10 hours. Within the Quantum Systems product family, the Reliant serves as the long-range component, positioned above the short-range drone Twister and the medium-range drone Vector AI. Reliant is a 4.3m wide and 2.38m long drone carrier designed for the U.S. It can launch the Archer drone designed by the U.S. company Neros. Like Quantum-Systems, Neros is backed by the German-American investor Peter Thiel. Through integrated machine learning systems powered by NVIDIA Jetson Orin processors, as well as visual-inertial navigation (VIO, SLAM), the device compensates for missing or disrupted GNSS signals.

In July 2026, a significantly revised version was unveiled, featuring a hybrid-electric propulsion system, increased payload capacity, and an entirely European supply chain.

== Use in combat ==
Following the start of Russia’s invasion of Ukraine in 2022, Vector UAVs priced at 180,000 euros apiece were sold to Ukraine in April 2022 for reconnaissance purposes. By August 2024, Quantum-Systems had delivered approximately 288 Vector drones to Ukraine, with another 187 on order. The drone transmits target data in real time to artillery and FPV units via battlefield management systems. In an operational report from the Zaporizhzhia region, a Vector UAV located a camouflaged Russian self-propelled howitzer and guided a Virtus by Stark a loitering munition onto the target.

In March 2026, Quantum-Systems was contracted by Ukraine’s security and defense forces to supply 15,000 "Strila" interceptor drones to the National Guard of Ukraine. Quantum Systems operates several locations in Ukraine, employing hundreds of staff. Furthermore, through its joint venture Quantum Frontline Industries, UAVs models developed in Ukraine are being manufactured in Germany.

== Operators ==
=== Military operators ===
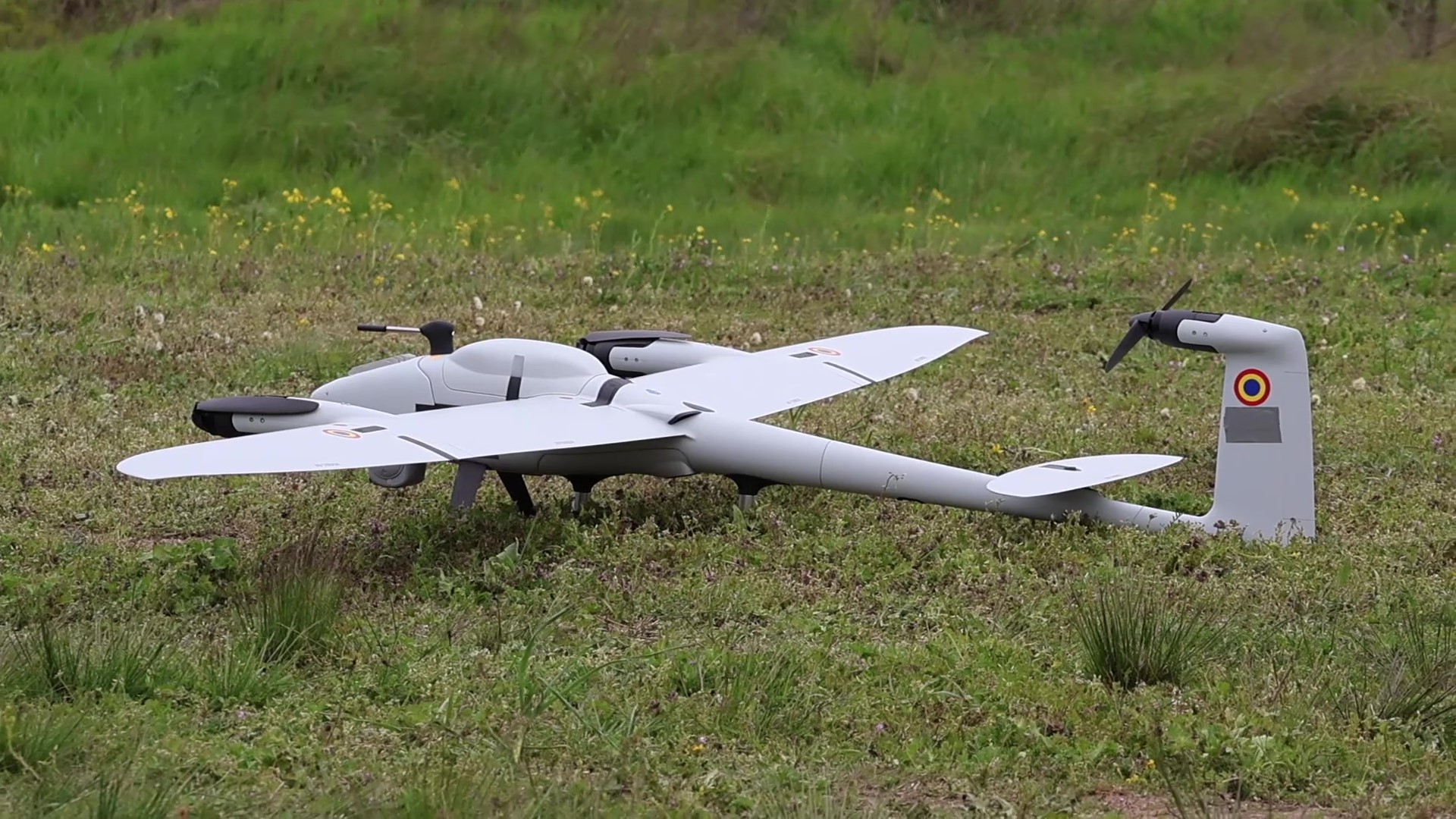
Romanian Quantum-Systems Vector drone during exercise Eastern Phoenix 2026

Australia
VECTOR selected by the Australian Defence in July 2024 through the Land 129 Phase 4B programme for AUD $90 million. The delivery is planned to start in April 2025.
Germany
VECTOR
- 14 drone systems purchased for the KSK special forces as part of the FALKE programme ("ferngeführte Aufklärungssystem, luftgestützt, kurze Entfernung").
Twister
- Framework agreement for 747 drones approved in December 2025:
  - First order of 147 drones.
Netherlands
First VECTOR supplied to the Dutch Ministry of Defence in October 2022.
New Zealand
Order in September 2023 for VECTOR drone.
Philippines
2 Trinity F90+ drones donated by Germany to the Philippine Coast Guard in 2022.
4 additional Trinity F90+ drones pledged by Germany in January 2024.
Romania
Contract of €18.4 million for 22 VECTOR Systems to equip the Romanian Armed Forces signed in May 2024. An additional 34 systems worth €31.4 million will be purchased through the Security Action for Europe (SAFE) program.
Spain
Spanish Army, order in April 2025 of €27 million for 91 VECTOR drones. The total budget can reach the limit of €45.3 million, and a possibility of 150 drones in total is mentioned.
Ukraine
Orders financed by Germany: (438)
- First order, August 2022, 33 VECTOR
- Second order, January 2023, 105 VECTOR
- Third order, May 2023, 300 VECTOR
Deliveries:
- 619 VECTOR supplied by Germany as of April 2025
United States
The U.S. government uses the Vector. It has a facility in Moorpark, California. The partnership with the American-Swiss (now American-German) drone software company Auterion (since 2020) is aimed at introducing Quantum-Systems drones to the U.S.government sector.
