= Kevin Harrington (national security advisor) =

American government official

- Born: 1969 or 1970
- Citizenship: United States
- Occupations: Physicist; hedge fund manager; government official
- Office: Senior director for strategic planning on the National Security Council

Kevin Harrington is an American physicist, hedge fund manager and government official, who serves as senior director for strategic planning on the National Security Council (NSC). Harrington was previously a managing director at Thiel Macro LLC (also a managing director or principal at Thiel Capital, and before that managing director at Clarium Capital) and a close associate of Peter Thiel.

== Education and early career ==
Harrington graduated summa cum laude with a Bachelor of Science in mathematics and physics from the University of Idaho. He was a Goldwater Scholar and conducted mathematics research for the Department of Defense.

He later pursued doctoral studies in physics at Stanford University as a NSF Fellow and consulted for the Stanford-based Center for International Security and Cooperation (CISAC) on fissile material security and critical infrastructure protection.

When at Stanford, he wrote for the Stanford Review. He is noted as having served as the senior class president in a 1995 Stanford news release.

== Business career ==
Harrington worked at Peter Thiel's Clarium Capital Management and later as managing director and head of research at Thiel Macro LLC, a San Francisco–based global macro hedge fund founded by Peter Thiel. He also worked at Thiel Capital. Harrington has been credited as a co-author of the original business plan for PayPal.

He was trusted by Thiel, who considered him his alter-ego and intellectual sparring partner. Harrington said, "Peter is my foil, and I’m his foil."”

== Government service ==
After Trump won his first term, on Thiel's recommendation, Harrington served in Trump's "landing team" at the Department of Commerce. According to Rob Lalka, he was involved in determining which positions political appointees would hold during this period.

In February 2017, Harrington was appointed by the White House as deputy assistant to the President for strategic planning, serving the National Security Council. Although he began with a midtier role, he was given the task of rewriting the National Security Strategy. Lalka criticized Harrington's work at this early stage as showing inexperience and dangerously pandering to Russia's interests, specifically concerning Harrington's advice that sanctions on Russian oil be lifted and U.S. troops withdraw from Eastern Europe. Later he moved to a more senior role. A number of sources link the role of Harrington's and some other tech-associated figures in the government with Thiel's influence, Palantir, and the broader alignment of the data-driven tech industry and politics. In 2017, Just Security noted that the choice of Harrington for a position of the second highest rank in the White House seemed to integrate a model used by Thiel in business with politics at the strategic level, which emphasized vision rather than strong grounding in the profession. In 2018, commenting on Michael Kratsios and Harrington's appointments, TriplePundit writes that, "Combined with the Palantir activity, all of this seems to indicate no small degree of conflict between Thiel’s role in business and his influence on US policy making."

In Trump's second term, Harrington again serves on the NSC as senior director. In September 2025, Politico reported that Harrington "is departing his role as NSC senior director for strategic planning, where he was helping to oversee the finishing touches on Trump’s new National Security Strategy." A White House official stated that Harrington would transition to the Department of Defense, though his specific role was not disclosed.

In 2025, the Brazilian newspaper Brasil de Fato (described by The New York Times as part of a "global web of Chinese propaganda") described Harrington's role as part of a broader "nationalist-conservative", "Christian-traditionalist" and anti-China alignment within Trump's foreign policy apparatus, which is also connected to the strategic placement of "Thiel acolytes" in key national security positions. The outlet writes that, "there are no right-wing realists on the NSC."

== See also ==
- Clarium Capital Management
- National Security Council (United States)
- Stanford Review
