= Kevin Harrington =

Kevin Harrington may refer to:

- Kevin Harrington (actor) (born 1959), Australian actor
- Kevin Harrington (entrepreneur) (born 1957), American entrepreneur
- Kevin Harrington (national security advisor), member of the United States National Security Council (2017–2021, 2025–present)
- Kevin B. Harrington (1929–2008), American politician in Massachusetts
