= Michael Kratsios =

American political advisor (born 1986)

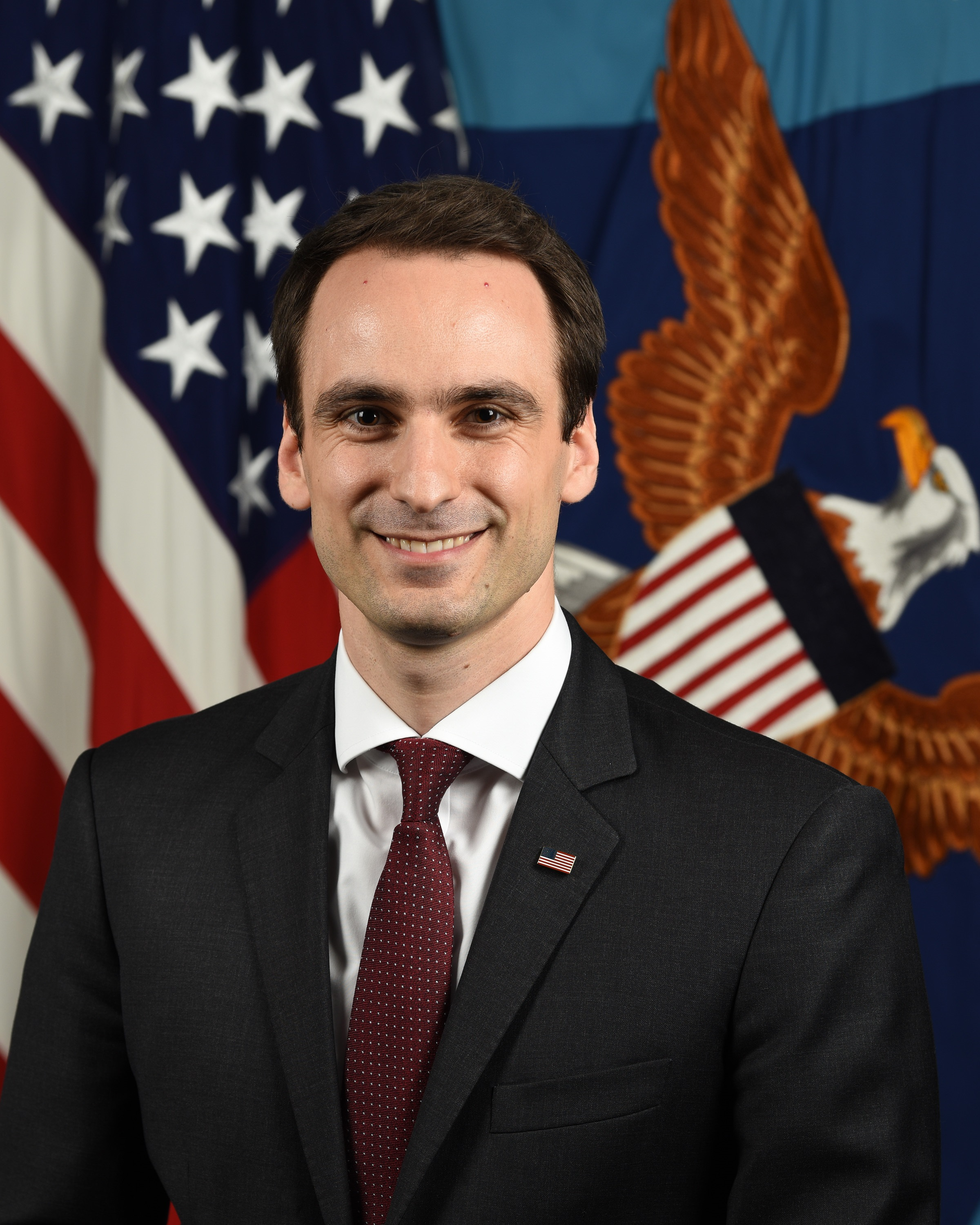
- Official portrait, 2020

13th Director of the Office of Science and Technology Policy
- Incumbent
- Assumed office March 25, 2025
- President: Donald Trump
- Preceded by: Arati Prabhakar

23rd Science Advisor to the President
- Incumbent
- Assumed office January 20, 2025
- President: Donald Trump
- Preceded by: Arati Prabhakar

Acting Under Secretary of Defense for Research and Engineering
- In office July 13, 2020 – January 20, 2021
- President: Donald Trump
- Preceded by: Michael D. Griffin
- Succeeded by: Terry Emmert (acting)

4th Chief Technology Officer of the United States
- In office August 2, 2019 – January 20, 2021
- President: Donald Trump
- Preceded by: Megan Smith
- Succeeded by: Ethan Klein

Personal details
- Born: Michael John Kotsakas Kratsios; November 7, 1986 (age 39)
- Education: Princeton University (BA)

Michael John Kotsakas Kratsios (born November 7, 1986) is an American political advisor and business executive who has served as the director of the Office of Science and Technology Policy and the science advisor to the president since 2025. Kratsios served as the acting under secretary of defense for research and engineering from 2020 to 2021 and as the chief technology officer of the United States from 2019 to 2021.

Kratsios graduated from Princeton University with a bachelor's degree in political science in 2008. After graduating from Princeton, he worked as an analyst at Barclays Capital and the Lyford Group International. Kratsios served as the chief financial officer of Peter Thiel's Clarium Capital. He later became a principal at Thiel Capital and served as Thiel's chief of staff. After Donald Trump's victory in the 2016 presidential election, Thiel hired Kratsios to work for Trump's presidential transition. In March 2017, Trump appointed Kratsios to serve as a deputy chief technology officer of the United States, the only employee in the chief technology officer's office.

In March 2019, Trump nominated Kratsios to serve as the chief technology officer of the United States. Kratsios was confirmed by the Senate in August. He became the acting under secretary of defense for research and engineering in July 2020. In May 2021, Kratsios became the managing director and head of strategy at Scale AI. In December 2024, Trump named Kratsios as his nominee for director of the Office of Science and Technology Policy. The following month, Kratsios became the science advisor to the president. He was confirmed by the Senate as the director of the Office of Science and Technology Policy in March 2025.

== Early life and education (1986–2008) ==
Michael John Kotsakas Kratsios was born on November 7, 1986. Kratsios was raised in South Carolina. He graduated from Richland Northeast High School in 2004. Kratsios graduated magna cum laude from Princeton University with a bachelor's degree in political science and a certificate in Hellenic studies in 2008. At Princeton, he interned for South Carolina senator Lindsey Graham. Kratsios served as the editor-in-chief and the president of Business Today. His collegiate research largely concerned economic voting.

== Career ==
=== Early career and Thiel work (2008–2017) ===
After graduating from Princeton, Kratsios worked as an analyst at Barclays Capital and the Lyford Group International. In 2010, Kratsios became a visiting scholar and instructor at Tsinghua University. That year, he began working for Peter Thiel's Clarium Capital. Kratsios served as Clarium's chief financial officer. He later became a principal at Thiel Capital and served as Thiel's chief of staff. Kratsios helped Thiel teach a two-week course at Tsinghua in 2016.

=== Trump administration positions (2017–2021) ===
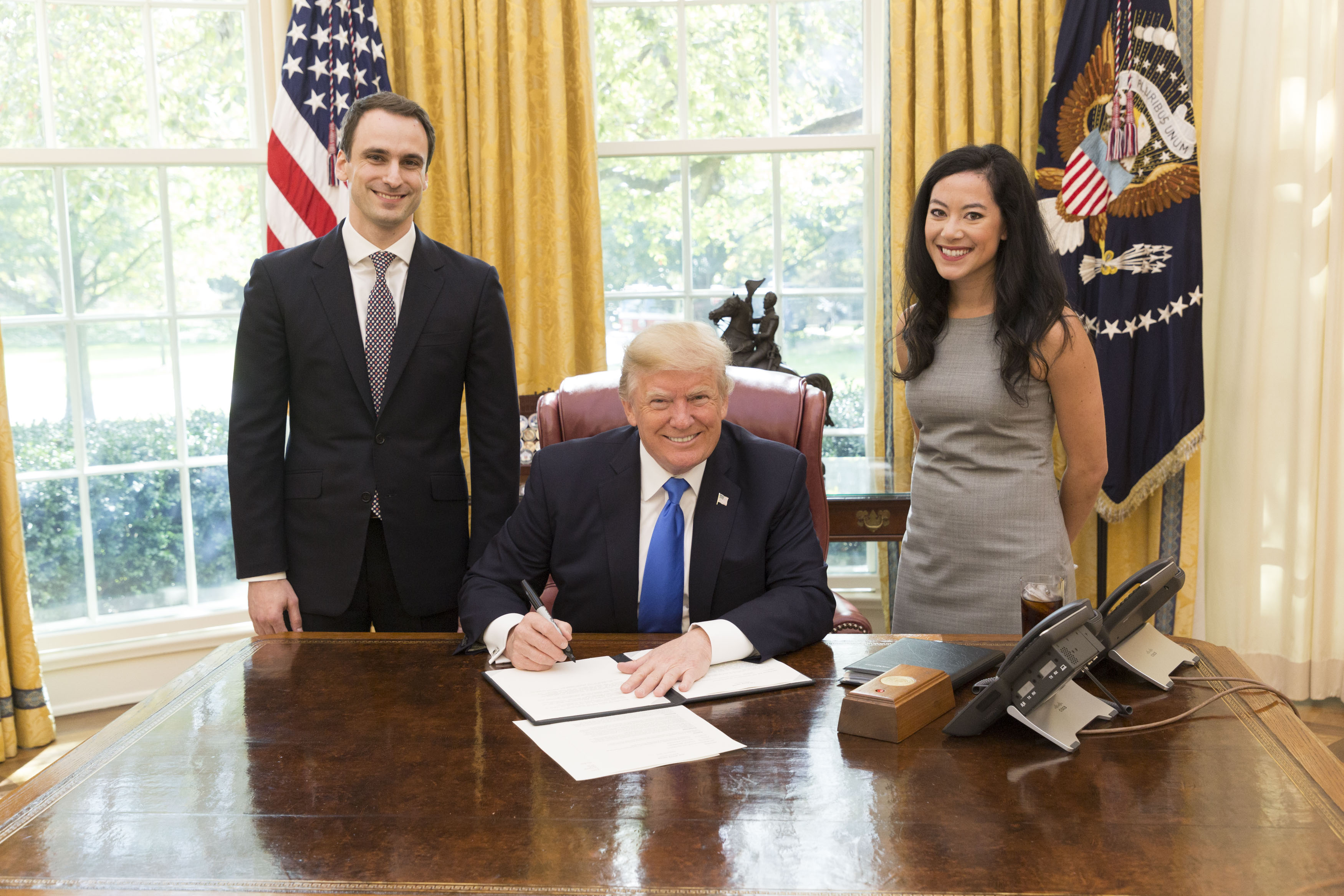
Kratsios (left) with President Donald Trump (center) in 2017

After Donald Trump's victory in the 2016 presidential election, Thiel hired Kratsios to assist in Trump's presidential transition. In March 2017, Politico reported that Trump had appointed Kratsios to serve as a deputy chief technology officer of the United States. According to The New York Times, the chief technology officer's office had been largely vacated of employees by that month, with the exception of Kratsios. In August, Kratsios and Mick Mulvaney, the director of the Office of Management and Budget, issued a memorandum directing the Department of Defense to prioritize multi-use technology and cut idealistic projects. Kratsios sought to develop a technology-policy agenda, although his efforts occurred amid criticism of the Trump administration from many scientists and business executives. He became the de facto leader of the Office of Science and Technology Policy as the only appointed official in the office; in February 2018, a Trump administration official told E&E News that a "triumvirate" was running the Office of Science and Technology Policy, including Kratsios, Ted Wackler, and Rachael Leonard. Kratsios told The Wall Street Journal in November 2017 that he sought to hire fifteen employees to the office.

In March 2019, Trump named Kratsios as his nominee to serve as the chief technology officer of the United States. Kratsios appeared before the Senate Committee on Commerce, Science, and Transportation on July 24. He pledged to support emerging technologies and stated that the government should provide resources to rural telecommunications carriers to remove Huawei equipment. The Senate voted to confirm Kratsios by unanimous consent on August 1. Kratsios's tenure occurred amid the COVID-19 pandemic. He assisted in a task force on technology and research involving COVID-19 and established an endeavor to allow researchers to use advanced computing for research into the disease. Kratsios led Trump's American AI Initiative. In May 2020, Kratsios and Kelvin Droegemeier, the director of the Office of Science and Technology Policy, oversaw a G7 meeting on artificial intelligence. In July, Kratsios was appointed as the acting under secretary of defense for research and engineering.

=== Post-government activities (2021–2024) ===
In March 2021, Kratsios began working for Scale AI. He became its managing director and head of strategy in May.

== Director of the Office of Science and Technology Policy (2025–present) ==
=== Nomination and confirmation ===
In November 2024, The New York Times reported that Kratsios had joined Donald Trump's presidential transition, overseeing its technology policies, and that he had expressed interest in joining Trump's forthcoming administration. By the following month, Kratsios had been interviewed for the position of director of the Office of Science and Technology Policy, according to the Times. Alongside Steve Davis, Kratsios led interviews for Elon Musk's Department of Government Efficiency initiative. On December 22, Trump named Kratsios as his nominee to serve as the director of the Office of Science and Technology Policy. Kratsios's nomination was met with criticism from some experts for his relevant inexperience; Kratsios was the first individual nominated to the position without a doctorate degree.

Trump concurrently appointed Kratsios to serve as the science advisor to the president. He submitted Kratsios's nomination to the Senate on January 22, 2025. Kratsios appeared before the Senate Committee on Commerce, Science, and Transportation on February 25. The committee advanced Kratsios's nomination in a 24–4 vote on March 12. The Senate confirmed Kratsios in a 74–25 vote on March 25.

=== Tenure ===
In April 2025, Kratsios outlined a three-point plan to improve the technology industry in the United States by protecting intellectual property, preventing U.S. adversaries from entering its infrastructure and supply chain, and enforcing export controls. After the United States brokered an Armenia–Azerbaijan peace agreement in August, Kratsios met with officials from Armenia and Azerbaijan on technology exchanges between the two countries.

== Views ==
Kratsios has advocated for lessened regulations on emerging technologies, particularly drones; in May 2018, he told representatives of several companies that the first Trump administration would not heavily regulate artificial intelligence. Kratsios criticized European Union regulators's plan to regulate artificial intelligence in February 2020. In September 2025, Kratsios rejected the United Nations Security Council's call for regulations on artificial intelligence.

In November 2019, Kratsios criticized Huawei's connections to the Chinese government. In April 2026, the second Trump administration published a memorandum written by Kratsios accusing China of "exploiting American expertise and innovation" by allegedly stealing artificial intelligence technology.

In response to the second Trump administration's budget cuts, Kratsios stated that the United States needed a "creative" allocation of its finances in April 2025. Kratsios has argued that the private sector should spend more money on scientific research and that the federal government spends too much on the bureaucracy.

Political offices
Preceded by Arati Prabhakar	Director of the Office of Science and Technology Policy; 2025–present	Incumbent
