= Christian Angermayer =

German entrepreneur and investor (born 1978)

- Born: April 26, 1978 (age 48); Wiesau, Bavaria, West Germany
- Citizenship: Germany
- Education: University of Bayreuth (dropped out)
- Occupations: Entrepreneur, investor, film producer, political advisor
- Known for: Founder of Apeiron Investment Group, atai Life Sciences, Enhanced Games, Plasma

Christian Angermayer (born 26 April 1978) is a German entrepreneur, investor and executive film producer. He is the founder of the private investment firm Apeiron Investment Group and the biotechnology company atai Life Sciences. Angermayer is a co-founder of the blockchain startup Plasma. His business interests include biotechnology, psychedelics-based medicine, longevity research, financial technology, cryptocurrency, and emerging technologies. In 2024, Forbes remarked that he is a pioneer in the cryptocurrency industry and was "seemingly behind every flashy investment of the last decade".

As of 2025, he is estimated by Forbes to have a net worth of US$1.2 billion.

He has a reputation as a notable, but controversial social networker with international ties to political figures, business people and media personalities, including the investor Peter Thiel and the Trump family. The Manager Magazin notes that he knows the Trump family and the Trump government better than any German business person or politician. He is a longtime advisor to Paul Kagame, the president of Rwanda.

== Early life and education ==
Angermayer was born in Wiesau, Germany on 26 April 1978. In 1998, he enrolled at the University of Bayreuth to study biochemistry, where he met two professors, Roland Kreutzer and Stefan Limmer who were working on a new gene-targeting method called RNA interference. In 2000, Angermayer and the professors started a company named Ribopharma AG. Although Angermayer, then 21, only held a minority stake, Ribopharma received backing from the German government, allowing him to drop out of college. In 2003, Ribopharma merged with Massachusetts-based Alnylam Pharmaceuticals, which later went public. The business made Angermayer a multimillionaire at age 25.

== Career ==
Angermayer began his career as an entrepreneur and financier, founding Apeiron Investment Group (based in Sliema, Malta), his family office and merchant-banking business, which invests across life sciences, financial technology, cryptocurrency and future technologies. In 2020, Peter Thiel became a strategic partner and anchor investor of Elevat3, which is set up by Apeiron to invest in startups in German-speaking countries. According to CNBC, The fund focuses on "life sciences, deep tech, fintech (financial technology), property and insurance". The fund has a partnership with the Founders Fund and Thiel Capital. The international venture arm of Apeiron is Presight Capital, which he co-founded with Fabian Hansen in order to invest outside Germany and Europe, and which raised its first fund (totalling $80 million) in 2019.

In 2018 he founded atai Life Sciences, a biotechnology company focused on developing treatments for mental-health conditions such as depression, anxiety and addiction, including through research on psychedelic compounds like psilocybin and DMT. Thiel is a backer of atai Life Sciences. In 2019, Scientific American remarked that, "Today, with a net worth of roughly $400 million accrued through various enterprises, Angermayer is one of the driving forces behind the movement to turn long-shunned psychoactive substances, like the psilocybin derived from so-called magic mushrooms, into approved medications for depression and other mental illnesses." Bloomberg refers to Angermayer as "he of magic mushrooms fame".

Through Apeiron, Angermayer has also co-founded or invested in several longevity-focused biotechnology companies, including Rejuveron Life Sciences and Cambrian Biopharma.

Beyond biotechnology, his portfolio includes cryptocurrency-related ventures, space technology, and brain–computer interface companies such as Blackrock Neurotech.

A businessline of Apeiron is making introductions between investors and the companies they want to invest in. Angermayer has helped Tether to become the majority shareholder in companies he invests in such as Frankfurt-based data center operator Northern Data (of which Thiel-backed Block.one is a shareholder) and Blackrock Neurotech (which he also co-chairs; Thiel is also an investor, having been introduced to the startup by Angermayer). Some of the deals made through Apeiron performed poorly for the investors, including Chinese conglomerate HNA Group's deal with Deutsche Bank (HNA became the largest shareholder in the struggling bank, then had to sell the shares and ultimately went bankrupt), or Softbank's deal with Wirecard (Softbank sold the shares before Wirecard went bankrupt).

He is a co-founder of Plasma (XPL), a blockchain startup that focuses on stablecoins and is designed as Bitcoin's sidechain. He invested in its seed round, alongside Thiel. Alongside Thiel, Mike Novogratz, Richard Li, Nomura and others, he invests in the blockchain company Bullish.

Angermayer and Novogratz co-founded Cryptology Asset Group, and have jointly invested in psychedelic ventures. Novogratz remarked that, "He’s probably the best networker I’ve ever met [...] He’s built this amazing network of people who like and have learned to trust him because he’s made them money. As a capital raiser, he’s awesome."

Angermayer is also involved in the film industry, having served as executive producer for several films including Coming In (2013), Filth (2013), Big Game (2014), Frankenstein (2015) , Hector and the Search for Happiness (2014), Army of Thieves (2021), Doctor Jekyll (2023). His film production company Film House Germany, founded by Angermayer in 2011, is based in Berlin and Los Angeles.

== Political activities ==
Since 2011, he has been a member of the World Economic Forum's (WEF) Young Global Leaders programme and Global Growth Companies' Advisory Council. He is also a member of the Clinton Global Initiative.

He is on the Presidential Advisory Council of Paul Kagame who has been president of Rwanda since 2000.

In 2019, after former UK prime minister Tony Blair's Africa Governance Initiative (AGI) was set up in Rwanda, Blair led a delegation to Kigali, which included Angermayer, who headed the business faction, which consisted of more than 45 European investors. Like Angermayer, Blair belongs to a group of advisors to Kagame, which also includes former US president Bill Clinton, businessman and professor Michael Porter, former World Bank's president Paul Wolfowitz.

Scientific American claims that, "Angermayer is plugged in to the German political scene, and is on good terms with German Chancellor Angela Merkel." According to Sifted, Angermayer "has also won the ear of political leaders — his sideboard has pictures of him with German chancellor Angela Merkel and Austrian chancellor Sebastian Kurz and European Central Bank head Christine Lagarde[...]." According to Handelsblatt, in the Eurozone crisis, Angermayer served as a contact person for Merkel due to his connection with hedge funds. (Note: Handelsblatt: "Auf seinem Sideboard finden sich Fotos mit Altkanzlerin Angela Merkel, für die er aufgrund seiner Hedgefonds-Kontakte ein Ansprechpartner in der Euro-Krise war[...]") Stern notes that around 2012, Angermayer's business faltered, and he shifted focus towards using his gift as a networker to broker contacts for high-level politicians and businesses. In 2012 alone, he offered to arrange around a dozen meetings with CDU politician Philipp Mißfelder.

Angermayer has been hosting exclusive side events as one of the Munich Security Conference sponsors.

== Views ==
Angermayer advocates what he calls the "Next Human Agenda", promoting technologies aimed at extending human healthspan and wellbeing. He has been a prominent proponent of the "psychedelic renaissance" in medicine, arguing for the therapeutic potential of psychedelic compounds in mental-health treatment. Recalling his first psychedelic experience, which he went through in 2014, he said, "I came out of the trip thinking if it's bringing this amount of positivity to me as a healthy happy person, I can totally understand how it has the medical potential to help people with depression, anxiety, addiction, and all that stuff." The media outlet Sifted remarks that, "Instrumental in the founding of Compass Pathways and chairman of atai Life Sciences, Christian Angermayer has been leading a global psychedelic renaissance." Compact writes that Angermayer is a futurist and "the most enthusiastic and visible psychedelic salesman."

== Controversies ==
In 2012, German business magazine Wirtschaftswoche analyzed Angermayer's conglomerate of then more than 40 companies, with 5bn euros under management, and the collapse of the CFC investment company that Angermayer's Silvia Quandt & Cie. took public. (Silvia Quandt & Cie. is acting like a bank without having a banking license, Wirtschaftswoche noted. Angermayer co-founded it in 2006, together with Silvia Quandt, her son Golo, and Joachim Paech. Angermayer used the Quandt family name to promote his subsidiary companies, and analysts from Angermayer's Silvia Quandt Research publish recommendations to buy stocks of Angermayer's subsidiaries.)

Angermayer has drawn media attention for some of his business associations and projects. Reports have discussed his links to political and business figures such as Peter Thiel, Donald Trump Jr. and involvement in ventures like the Enhanced Games, a planned alternative to the Olympics that permits performance-enhancing substances. Thiel and Trump Jr., who are his friends, both invest in Enhanced Games, of which Angermayer is a co-founder. Angermayer's relationship with Donald Trump also started before his first presidency, when the former brokered the German rights for Trump's books in 2015.

Angermayer is also a close associate of German politicians Peter Altmaier, Jens Spahn and former Austrian chancellor Sebastian Kurz. In 2023, the Stern made inquiries to the government about Angermayer, his involvement with the space laser company Mynaric (which has business dealings with China, and which Thiel also invests in) and his contacts (and possible lobbying activities) with German politicians like Altmaier and Jörg Kukies. The latter had participated in events organized by Angermayer such as "Angermayer Policy & Innovation Forum", co-hosted by Sebastian Kurz in 2022.

In 2023, a Business Insider report described an FBI inquiry into Peter Thiel and his relationships with people known to represent Kremlin's interests. The report also revealed aspects of Angermayer's network. Thiel told the FBI that Angermayer introduced him to the Russian diplomat Daniil Bisslinger at Angermayer's birthday party in 2017. Bisslinger later tried to invite Thiel to meet Putin directly (twice, in 2018 and 2022). Thiel thought that the 2022 invitation was Putin's attempt to deceive him that the Ukraine invasion would not happen. Angermayer confirmed that they were present at his birthday party although he did not remember that he introduced Bisslinger to Thiel and he denied any knowledge of their conversation. A fourth source confirmed with Business Insider and Die Welt that Angermayer introduced Bisslinger to Thiel, and that Bisslinger tried to contact Thiel in 2018 and 2022.

== Personal life ==
Angermayer is a lifelong teetotaler. He is homosexual. He has a small tattoo of the skeletal formula of psilocybin on his arm and collects artworks related to psychedelics, gay emperors and their lovers. Angermayer resided in London until 2024, after which he relocated to Lugano in Switzerland for tax-related reasons. He maintains business operations in London, Berlin, New York City, and Abu Dhabi. Angermayer has identified as "sort of a conservative libertarian." He is a Christian and believes that psychedelic use supports religious belief.
