= Jeff Thomas (model) =

American model and influencer (1987–2023)

- Thomas in 2022
- Born: Jeffrey Robert Thomas; May 16, 1987; United States
- Died: March 8, 2023 (aged 35); Miami, Florida, U.S.
- Occupations: Model; influencer

Jeffrey Robert Thomas (May 16, 1987 – March 8, 2023) was an American model and influencer. He was known for his modelling career, and for his widely publicized relationship with German-American billionaire Peter Thiel, his collaboration with Democratic researchers who were investigating Thiel, as well as his sudden death, which was ruled a suicide by Miami police.

== Early life and career ==
Thomas began modeling in his twenties. By 2013, he was active in New York and working with photographers like Tony Duran and Justin Clynes. He was represented by Wilhelmina Models in New York, Chosen Models in Chicago and Kim Dawson Agency in Dallas. In 2014, STYLECASTER listed him as one of the promising young male models, noting that, "Originally from Texas, Jeff now travels the world and recently walked in the DSQUARED fashion show at Life Ball 2014 in Vienna." He also modeled for ADAM NYC. He appeared on the Italian Magazine for Fashion, represented by the agency Independent Men.

By 2016, he was also represented by Wilhelmina Models in Miami, doing advertising for Calvin Klein and Diesel. At some point, he signed with AMCK Models. He was active on social media, gaining over 120,000 Instagram followers, where he documented his work in fashion, fitness, and travel. His bio described him as an "Aspiring Fire Fighter" and "Proud Dog Dad". He founded an art consulting and creative agency called One Popsicle, promoting emerging artists and brands.

== Relationship with Peter Thiel ==
Thomas was reported to have entered a financial relationship with billionaire investor Peter Thiel at the onset of the COVID-19 pandemic. The relationship was described by some reports as financially unequal; Thomas referred to himself as being "kept", citing gifts such as a $300,000 car and a luxury home. Thomas said he knew Thiel supported the Republican Party and Thomas disliked that, but since his father was also a Republican who was from Texas, he felt he could understand people with opposing views.

Before his death, Thomas reportedly encouraged Thiel to withdraw from politics and expressed discomfort with Thiel's associations with Donald Trump. Another politician whom Thomas criticized was Blake Masters, who was anti-gay according to Thomas. Thomas tried to dissuade Thiel from his increasingly aggressive pursuit of a culture war, which Thomas felt was hurting the LGBTQ+ community.

Shortly before his death, Thomas decided to work with Democratic researchers to push Thiel out of politics. He was approached in October 2022 by operatives linked to Democratic opposition researcher Jack Bury, a protégé and associate of David Brock. Bury was leading a donor-funded effort to gather damaging personal intel on Thiel in hopes of diminishing his political influence before the midterms. Bury's associate Ryan Kenney arranged a meeting at The Beverly Hills Hotel. On November 4, 2022, Bury texted Thomas directly about the ongoing work of Intercept reporter Ryan Grim concerning Thiel and Thomas: "Ryan [Grim] proposed at least having a conversation with him about what you're comfortable with having printed [...] being offered the option to approve a reporter's final draft beforehand is super rare [...] But I pushed for that because I like you & I didn't want you to be caught off guard. Your name will be in print anyway, so why not control it and be protected?". After a lunch meeting, Thomas was persuaded to cooperate.

But over time, Thomas reportedly became emotionally conflicted about the collaboration and distraught about the possibility of having his name appear in the news. At the time, Thomas' friends as well as some of his Republican family members had advised him not to talk, while Thiel encouraged him to move to Miami to escape the media scrutiny after hearing him speak about it.

== Death ==
According to some sources, in late December 2022, Thomas attended a New Year's Eve party hosted at Thiel's Miami Beach compound, although he was not invited (the guest list was pre-approved by Thiel's spouse, Matt Danzeisen). Puck said Thiel's circle denied that the confrontation happened. According to the German edition of Business Insider, another friend of Thiel said that there was an argument, but Danzeisen had always known about the existence of Thomas just like other people. The source also said that the relationship between Thiel and Danzeisen was stable, and Thiel would never divorce Danzeisen. The friend implied that Thomas was originally from a group of "party boys", from whom billionaires usually chose their lovers.

Thomas was found dead on March 8, 2023, at the bottom of an apartment building in the Brickell neighborhood of Miami, Florida. The Miami Police Department investigated his death, which was ruled a suicide.

== Aftermath and media response ==
The Intercept notes that the Daily Mail published at least four stories on Thomas's death but did not mention his relationship with Thiel. One article quoted his agent speculating he fell while taking a selfie, a claim without evidence as the agent was not there, as Thomas's friends were calling for a thorough Miami police investigation. His brother, Skylar Ray Thomas, stated that Jeff had experienced mental-health struggles and drug addiction. A cousin of Thomas's did not believe it was a suicide. Puck commented that certain media sources seemed to want to push Thomas's death close to Thiel. The outlet reports that other people, who had been promised "millions" to tell dirt on Thiel, felt "cornered or misled" due to the Bury team's aggressive tactics too. Puck notes that a conversation among Bury's team members discussed how to establish trust with a "victim".

Thiel refused to comment on Thomas's death, saying that Thomas's family had demanded that he refrain from doing so. Thomas's stepfather, who had raised him, said that Thomas died in a complicated situation and that he knew full details about the relationship between Thomas and Thiel, having spoken to Thiel many times (before his death, Thomas said he was "honest with my family about the relationship").

Coverage of Thomas's death and the surrounding events sparked broader debate over power imbalances, privacy, and the intersection of wealth, sexuality, and political influence. The Intercept comments that Thomas "spoke with several Democratic and progressive activists who are working to expose what they see as Thiel's hypocrisy", while both of Thiel's prominent candidates, Vance and Masters, "ran heavily on culture war issues, portraying themselves as fighting for an America with traditional conservative values against the libertine coastal elites." Miami New Times remarks that, to Thomas, "the relationship was at times a source of stress, and that he felt as if he was being shown off." Theodore Schleifer of Puck wrote that the anti-Thiel campaign exposed an undercurrent in modern politics in which there is an increasing tendency towards using people's private problems to achieve political goals. The Washington Free Beacon put the Thomas affair in perspective, noting that a similar strategy from researchers seemed to apply in the case of Pennsylvania's David McCormick, who was approached by a researcher who posed as a journalist.
