= Phillip Kingston =

British-Australian entrepreneur

Phillip Kingston (born 7 August 1985) is a British-Australian entrepreneur and engineer. He founded Sargon and GrowthOps.

== Career ==
=== Sargon ===
Kingston founded Sargon, a financial technology and superannuation services firm, with Aron D'Souza in 2013.

In 2019, Sargon sought to float itself on the Australian Securities Exchange, with it being reported that backers hoped it would be valued at over AUS$1 billion.

Sargon went into administration in February 2020, after creditors appointed receivers to try to recover unpaid debts from the firm. Creditors included GrowthOps, another of Kingston's businesses, which was owed "an amount below $1.8 million" and told investors it was unsure whether the money was recoverable. Sargon's lender, Taiping Trustees, was owed $100m and in September 2020, sought to freeze Kingston's assets but was blocked by a court order.

In August 2021, it was reported that documents tabled to Parliament by Liberal MP Tim Wilson showed that the parent company of Taiping Trustees had misdirected repayments in "a deliberate effort to take ownership" of Sargon. In December 2021, the Federal Court of Australia agreed to hear the case Kingston had brought to appoint special liquidators to investigate the claims that Sargon had been deliberately bankrupted. Kingston withdrew the suit in March 2023.

=== GrowthOps ===
Kingston originally founded KDIS, a digital services provider, in 2008. It became GrowthOps in 2017 after merging with nine IT firms. It floated on the Australian Securities Exchange in 2018, being valued at $64m. It posted losses of $13.6m in 2018 and over $65m in 2019, but cut this to a $24m loss in 2020 after restructuring. Kingston left the board in February 2020 during Sargon's receivership. GrowthOps delisted itself in October 2020, with its shares trading at 6.5¢ down from a high of $1.30.

=== Other activities ===
Kingston founded Trimantium Capital in 2008 as a family office, before turning it into a pooled fund in 2013. He has also been a board member of the Victoria State Government’s LaunchVic initiative to build the state’s entrepreneurial and startup ecosystem, and is the author of The War for Eyeballs: An Introduction to Internet Marketing (2010).
