= Valar Ventures =

Venture capital fund

- Type: Private
- Industry: Venture capital
- Founded: 2010; 16 years ago
- Founders: Andrew McCormack; James Fitzgerald; Peter Thiel
- Headquarters: New York City, U.S
- Website: valar.com

Valar Ventures is a US-based venture capital fund founded by Andrew McCormack, James Fitzgerald and Peter Thiel in 2010. Historically, the majority of the firm's investments have been in technology startups based outside of Silicon Valley, including in Europe, the UK, the US and Canada. Valar Ventures originally spun out of Thiel Capital, Peter Thiel's global parent company based in San Francisco, and is now headquartered near Madison Square in Manhattan. The firm's namesake is the Valar of J. R. R. Tolkien's legendarium, who are god-like immortal spirits that chose to enter the mortal world to prepare it for their living creations. Andrew McCormack and James Fitzgerald are the managing partners of the firm.

== History ==
In 2010, Valar Ventures was spun out of Thiel Capital as a venture fund focused on international fintech (but also invests in other branches of tech). Thiel largely left Andrew McCormack and James Fitzgerald to run the firm.

In November 2013, CB Insights remarked on Thiel and his venture firms that, it was an unusual strategy for a single investor to be associated with, let alone founded three VC firms. But the creation of Valar and Mithril Capital did not seem to reflect a declining performance of his older firm, the Founders Fund, nor did they seem to impede the Founders Fund in making new deal: "In fact, Thiel's launch of Valar and Mithril in 2012 came in the same year that Founders Fund completed its highest amount of financing deals in four years."

The firm is active in Europe, especially in Germany and the UK. This comes even though Thiel often complains about the investment environment in Europe. It also invests in Latin America, having made its first foray into Brazil in 2012, when it invested in Oppa (a design and furniture company, founded by German expatriate Max Reichel), and Mexico in 2019, when it invested in the challenger bank Albo. Its first foray into Africa was the 2021 investment in Kuda Bank. The $20 million Series A Valar led for the UAE-based fintech baraka was the VC's first investment in the region.

Around the time Thiel was pushing the New Zealand government to make him a citizen (he got the citizenship in 2011), Valar started to become active in New Zealand. It had no staff in New Zealand though, as Thiel entrusted operations to what his biographer Max Chafkin calls "a team of loyalists", led by his longtime boyfriend Matt Danzeisen and McCormack.

In 2015 and 2016, financier and child sex trafficker Jeffrey Epstein invested $40 million into two funds managed by Valar Ventures. Leaked emails (released by the hacker group Handala, which "likely operates out of Iran’s Ministry of Intelligence", according to Reuters) show that Epstein leveraged his relationship with former Israeli Prime Minister Ehud Barak to get access to Thiel. Epstein arranged for Barak to meet Thiel in New York in 2014. In 2016, Epstein pitched Reporty (later Carbyne) to Valar, but the proposal got rejected on account of being premature. Valar's McCormack said they would try to reengage when the startup was more developed. In 2018, the Founders Fund, another firm co-founded by Thiel, joined the $15 million Series B.

Documents (emails and schedules) reviewed by The Wall Street Journal in 2023 show that others, including Woody Allen and Obama's advisor Kathryn Ruemmler participated in the meetings between Thiel and Epstein. Reid Hoffman, Thiel's friend from the PayPal Mafia and a big Democratic donor was the one who directly introduced Thiel to Epstein (for years Epstein acquaintances had tried to invite Thiel to meet Epstein but were rejected) and also participated.

== Investments ==
Valar was notably the first venture fund to invest in Xero. The fund made its initial investment in Xero in October 2010 at a valuation of approximately $98 million. Since then, the firm has spearheaded successive rounds of investment in the company and Xero's market cap has grown to more than $4 billion as of February 2014.

Valar also led the Series A (January 2013) and Series B (April 2014) financing rounds of Wise, then operating under the name TransferWise. Following Valar's investment, Andreessen Horowitz led TransferWise's Series C.

Both Xero and TransferWise were investments out of Valar's $100M first fund, which was a series of special purpose vehicles, including a $32 million New Zealand specific fund. Additional investments in startups include: Breather, N26 (€10 million in a 2016 series A round), Descomplica, Dinda, Even, EyeEm, Granify, Homie, Lystable, Oppa, fintech Stash, TradeIt, and Vend. In 2018, Valar led Series A funding for Petal, a fintech start up and led a second round of funding for Coya, a German insurance startup.

In February 2019, Valar Ventures led a $28 million Series B funding round for Cluno, a mobility and fintech company based in Germany. Acton Capital Partners and Atlantic Labs, which both backed the company's Series A round, also participated.
