= STARK =

European defence company

SKD SE
- Trade name: STARK
- Type: Private
- Industry: Defence
- Founded: 2024; 2 years ago
- Founders: Johannes Schaback; Florian Seibel; Uwe Horstmann
- Headquarters: Berlin, Germany
- Key people: Johannes Schaback (CTO), Uwe Horstmann (CEO)
- Products: STARK OWE-V Virtus; Minerva mission control software; various UAVs & USVs; STARK USV: Vanta; C-UAS
- Number of employees: 700 (2025)
- Website: stark-defence.com

SKD SE, trading as STARK, is a European defence technology company specialised in unmanned systems across multiple domains. The company sells loitering munitions to the German Bundeswehr and NATO states.

== History ==
In early 2024, the founder of Quantum Systems Florian Seibel together with his co-CEO at Quantum, Sven Kruck, and other entrepreneurs launched the company Stark Defence. Stark Defence ist developing and producing combat UAVs. The statutes of many early investors prohibited the development of lethal weapons at Quantum Systems, originally a civilian start-up focused on agriculture and cartography. Consequently, Seibel spun off the business involving armed, one-way drones into a separate company called Stark Defence. The company was formed to address urgent operational demands highlighted by the Russian invasion of Ukraine.

In early 2025, STARK launched its flagship products, the OWE-V Virtus loitering munition and the Minerva mission control suite. By mid-2025, the company opened a new production facility in Munich, and later that year the German Federal Ministry of Defence reportedly placed an order for extended testing and trials of the OWE-V Virtus with the Bundeswehr.

In July 2025, the company planned to open a 40,000-square-foot factory in Swindon, UK. The following month, the company raised $62 million in a new funding round led by Sequoia Capital, valuing the company at $500 million.

At the same time, STARK acquired Berlin-based startup Pleno, which develops navigation technology for low-cost drones operating in communications-denied environments.

In 2025, STARK conducted a coordinated reconnaissance and strike mission in Ukraine using its reconnaissance and precision-strike platforms. The same year, the company secured a €300 million contract with the German Bundeswehr for the supply of loitering munitions and supporting systems.

In October 2025, STARK's trials with the British and German militaries resulted in none of four Virtus drones hitting their targets. One drone crashed into a forest in Germany, while another caught fire after an impact in Kenya. STARK said such incidents were part of its testing process and that it had crashed drones about 100 times during development.

In November 2025, Germany planned to award contracts worth up to €900 million to STARK, Helsing, and Rheinmetall for a combined total of 12,000 loitering munitions, with each company expected to receive approximately €300 million. The Bundeswehr selected STARK and Helsing as suppliers for the programme in April 2025.

In January 2026, STARK opened an office in Stockholm, Sweden.

The next month, the company launched an R&D hub in Ukraine and a new office in Greece.

The new Ukrainian facility focuses on R&D, integration, training and support.

Later in February 2026, STARK secured a framework contract to supply several thousand systems to the Bundeswehr's Brigade 45. STARK also signed an agreement to supply loitering munitions to a European NATO member state, with deliveries scheduled through August 2026.

In April 2026, STARK participated in trials of artificial intelligence-enabled unmanned aerial vehicle (UAS) swarm technology, integrating loitering munitions, reconnaissance platforms, and command-and-control software in a combined reconnaissance and strike exercise.

On 23 June 2026, STARK raised €500 million in a Series C funding round co-led by Sequoia Capital and Founders Fund, with participation from the NATO Innovation Fund and Döpfner Capital. The funding round increased the company's valuation to more than €3.5 billion and brought its total funding to approximately €640 million.

== Products ==
STARK Defence develops machine-learning-supported, software-defined combat UAVs. In addition, STARK offers a line of custom UAVs and USVs for reconnaissance, surveillance, and precision engagements, along with proprietary command-and-control interfaces and datalinks.

=== Virtus (OWE-V) ===
Virtus is a vertical take-off loitering munition designed for medium ranges of up to 130 kilometers. It carries a warhead weighing up to 5 kilograms, intended for engaging armored targets, and reaches speeds of up to 250 km/h during a dive. It is STARK’s core product and electrically powered and cruising at 120 km/h, diving at up to 250 km/h and operating for 60 minutes. It can be launched from static or mobile platforms without additional infrastructure, and within six months of its introduction was deployed in Ukraine against a range of ground and strategic targets.

The company’s Minerva software suite enables precision-strike coordination in GNSS-denied or data-link-degraded environments, integrates with existing battle management systems, and orchestrates temporally and spatially synchronized strike swarms.

=== Cascade ===
This system is a "tube-launched effector" designed for high-volume precision strikes, so the ooficial name is OWE-T for One-Way-Effector, Tube-Launched. It is part of STARK uncrewed surface vessel Vanta-6 platform. It was sold to the Bundeswehr's Cyber and Information Domain Service.

=== Gambit ===
Gambit is a man-portable, short-range loitering munition. It was tested in collaboration with warhead specialist TDW and is designed for rapid deployment by infantry forces. The UAV uses the warhead from the "Enforcer" small missile, which was developed by MBDA Germany.

=== Vanta USVs ===
STARK’s maritime systems include the Vanta-4 and Vanta-6 unmanned surface vessels, designed for reconnaissance and strike missions in open-water environments.

=== C-UAS ===
In March 2026, STARK presented counter-unmanned aerial systems (C-UAS) designed to detect and counter hostile drones.

In April 2026, the company partnered with Hannover-based INLEAP Photonics to accelerate the deployment of laser-based C-UAS for use by armed forces and operators of critical infrastructure.
