= Enhanced Games =

Multi-sport event

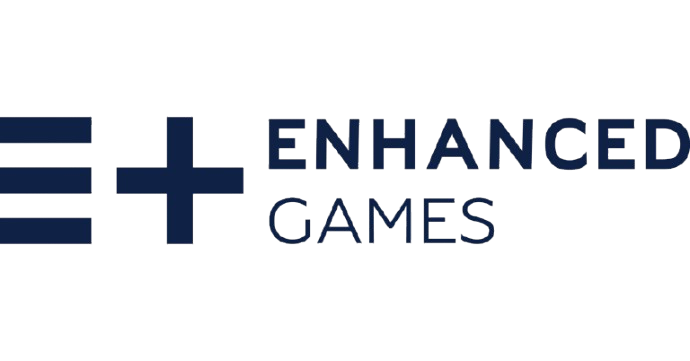
- Enhanced Games logo as of 2025
- Abbreviation: TEG
- Purpose: To be the first event of its kind to permit performance-enhancing drugs and not follow the rules of the World Anti-Doping Agency (WADA).
- Inaugurated: Las Vegas, Nevada, United States, 24 May 2026
- CEO: Maximilian Martin
- Headquarters: 71 Fort Street, George Town, Grand Cayman, Cayman Islands
- Remarks: Organized by Enhanced Group Inc., a publicly traded company listed on the New York Stock Exchange under the ticker symbol NYSE: ENHA
- Website: enhanced.com

The Enhanced Games (TEG) is a multi-sport event. Founded by Australian businessman Aron D'Souza, it allows athletes to use performance-enhancing substances without being subject to drug tests; organizers claim these substances must be FDA-approved and used under medical supervision. D'Souza stated that he founded the Games based on the principle of bodily autonomy for athletes, further alleging that the International Olympic Committee (IOC) maintains an exploitative relationship with competitors.

Reactions from the sporting world, scientific community, and media outlets have generally been negative, with commentators highlighting the safety risks of encouraging performance-enhancing drug use. The first event took place on 24 May 2026 in Las Vegas, and included competitions in swimming, athletics, and weightlifting.

== Background ==
=== Origins and development (2023–2025) ===
The Enhanced Games (TEG) is to be the first event of its kind to support performance-enhancing drugs and not follow the rules of the World Anti-Doping Agency (WADA). Performance-enhancing drugs will not be mandatory for participants. When announced in June 2023, the event was intended to be annual and to include five categories: track and field, swimming, weightlifting, gymnastics, and combat sports. Such an event has been discussed hypothetically for many years but never been realised. Prosthetic limbs and shoe technology will be allowed. Aron D'Souza, president of the organisation, says that for insurance reasons, only FDA-approved substances will be allowed. Cocaine and heroin will not be allowed. According to D'Souza, athletes should also be categorised based on their chromosomal sex.

Originally planned for December 2024, D'Souza estimated the number of athletes to be "maybe a couple of thousand". By late 2025, organizers were aiming for 50 participants in the first event, with 38 confirmed as of 10 February 2026. Brett Fraser, chief athletics officer of the organisation, said that the planned included sports are a "core suite of products", and can be improved upon in the future. The scale will depend on funding, and the location was planned to be a university campus or similar facility in the southern United States. D'Souza said in early 2024 that he now had the equity capital to fund the first event.

=== First Games (2026) ===
By August 2023, representatives were saying that what would take place in 2024 would be a smaller "exhibition", with a "full event" taking place in 2025. In 2023, CNN questioned the viability of the event; however, in May 2025, the organization announced plans to hold the games in May 2026 at Resorts World Las Vegas, and that the sports included are to be swimming, track and field, and weightlifting. The event took place on May 24, 2026. Kristian Gkolomeev beat the current non-drug-assisted world record for 50-meter freestyle. TEG reported that 12 athletes had beaten their personal records. Mainstream media generally described the inaugural Enhanced Games as a flop, with the performances and results described by commentators as underwhelming. After the event, stock for A Paradise Acquisition Corp., the Enhanced Games' parent company, dropped by 70%.

=== Corporate affairs ===
In December 2025, Enhanced Games CEO and co-founder Maximilian Martin stated that the venture was not intended to compete directly with the Olympic movement; he characterized the two models as serving distinct purposes, asserting that the event would pursue organizational goals independent of the Olympic Games.

Enhanced Games announced a special-purpose acquisition company merger agreement in 2026 with a firm named A Paradise Acquisition, renaming the company the Enhanced Group, with a projected valuation of $1.2 billion. Preceding the inaugural 2026 games, the entity went public on May, 8 2026, listed as EHNA on the New York Stock Exchange.

Enhanced Games shares the Enhanced brand name and the Enhanced logo with Live Enhanced, an online pharmacy performance supplement business. Enhanced Group CEO Maximilian Martin stated that Enhanced comprises the games and the consumer platform.”

== People ==
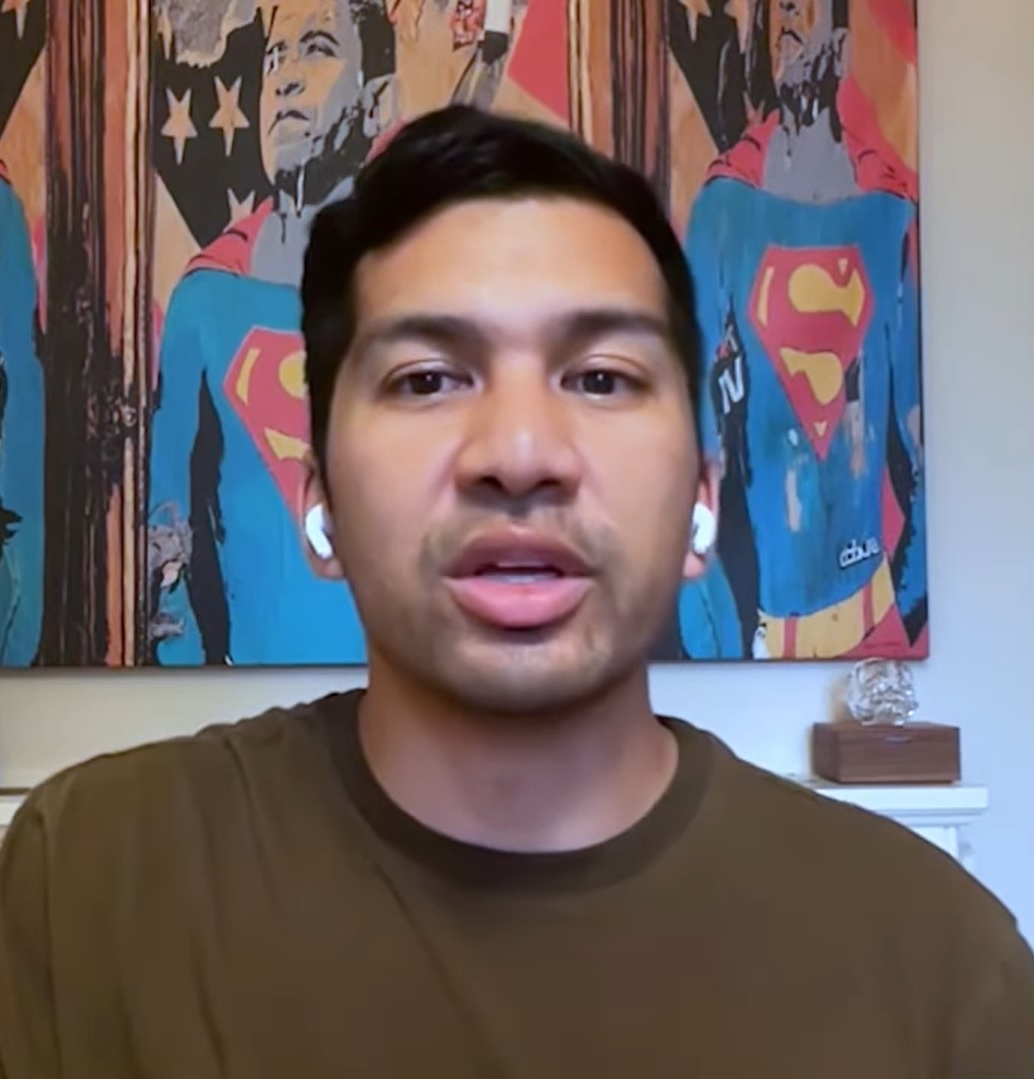
Aron D'Souza in 2025

Aron D'Souza, an Australian businessman based in London, founded the privately funded organisation. He says he had the idea for TEG in 2022 when noticing that many people at an American gym were obviously using steroids. He was, together with billionaire Peter Thiel, involved in the 2013 Bollea v. Gawker lawsuit, which led to Gawker filing for bankruptcy. In 2015, he co-founded the company Sargon with Phillip Kingston. D'Souza said,

Athletes are adults ... and they have a right to do with their body what they wish – my body, my choice; your body, your choice, ... And no government, no paternalistic sports federation, should be making those decisions for athletes – particularly around products that are FDA regulated and approved.

If we cut out all the waste, the layers of bureaucracy, the needless building of infrastructure, this event can be delivered for virtually nothing, and we can use all the surplus profits to pay the athletes, to invest in R&D, build better and better technology and build a bigger and bigger event.

In 2024, D'Souza criticized the International Olympic Committee (IOC), alleging institutional corruption and inadequate athlete compensation. He also advocated for the abolition of the World Anti-Doping Agency (WADA), characterizing it as an "anti-science" extension of the IOC. D'Souza also argued that the Olympic program includes insignificant sports.

He states that he has never used performance-enhancing drugs himself. By late 2025, he had been replaced as chief executive by Maximilian Martin, investment banker and bitcoin miner.

Olympians attached to the organisation as of 2023 include Brett Fraser, Roland Schoeman, and Christina Smith. In 2025, Brett Hawke was named head swim coach. Other people include geneticist George Church. German biotech billionaire Christian Angermayer is co-founder of the organisation.

D'Souza became Thiel's confidant in the process of leading the Gawker plan for him, and through Thiel's introduction, a friend of Angermayer. According to The Spectator, in December 2022, as D'Souza and other members of their small community of gay tech founders were about to gather for the annual party at Thiel's residence in Miami (formerly held while travelling the world, until Thiel had children), D'Souza came up with the idea of the Enhanced Games. After receiving positive feedback from Thiel (while other investors thought that the idea was "outside the Overton window"), D'Souza spent the next six months developing the project. Later, after reading about the plan on German media, Angermayer notified D'Souza that he wanted to come on board as a co-founder. Thiel and Angermayer agreed to invest after a lunch, also held for members of the gay tech community, around mid-2023. The Wired notes that Thiel and Angermayer were not particularly interested in sports, but D'Souza was a savvy fundraiser.

Angermayer said his backing of TEG stems from his belief that AI will create more leisure time and boost demand for sports entertainment. He said, "Humans are wired to want to see the fastest man or woman [...] They don't want to see the fastest natural man."

=== Investors ===
In January 2024, TEG announced that it had secured a multi-million-dollar investment round from venture capitalists, including Thiel, Angermayer and Balaji Srinivasan. In February 2025, businessman Donald Trump Jr. said that his venture fund 1789 Capital would be involved in an investment round, saying "The Enhanced Games represent the future – real competition, real freedom, and real records being smashed. This is about excellence, innovation, and American dominance on the world stage – something the MAGA movement is all about." Others include Saudi prince Khaled bin Alwaleed Al Saud, and cryptocurrency investors Cameron and Tyler Winklevoss.

=== Athletes ===
Australian swimmer and Olympic medalist James Magnussen said in February 2024 that he would end his retirement to compete in the games in an attempt to break the 50 m freestyle world record. D'Souza pledged a US$1 million prize if he did break it, and Magnussen said that he will "... juice to the gills ... break it in six months". He also said that the money could set him up for the next decade, that sport is about entertainment and is sometimes taken too seriously, and "This is not for everyone, and it is certainly not something for young athletes." According to Magnussen, as of May 2025 the performance-enhancing drugs he has taken include testosterone, BPC-157, CJC-1295, ipamorelin and thymosin.

In May 2025, TEG announced that Greek swimmer Kristian Gkolomeev had unofficially broken the long course 50 metres freestyle world record at a February 2025 private event, beating Magnussen to the record and winning the $1 million prize. He reportedly swam the course in 20.89 seconds, 0.02 seconds faster than the record held by César Cielo. The performance-enhancing drugs he used, if any, were not disclosed. Other swimmers to join TEG included American Megan Romano, the first female participant, Ukrainian Andriy Govorov, as of 2026 the world record holder of the 50 m butterfly (long course), and Bulgarian Josif Miladinov.

In September 2025, British swimmer and 2024 Olympic 50m freestyle silver medallist Ben Proud announced he would be joining TEG. Also in September, TEG announced that American sprinter and 2022 100 m world champion Fred Kerley will be competing.

== Editions ==
Number	Year	Host	Sports	Events	Nations	Athletes
1	2026	Las Vegas, United States	3	23	24	42

== Reactions ==
Fraser stated in July 2023 that over five hundred athletes had contacted him asking for more information. In August, D'Souza said that he had 500 "sleeper athletes" who are "breaking world records in their basement and sending us videos of it" ready for competition. In February 2024, he said that thousands of athletes interested in participating had contacted him. CNN reported in October 2023 that no athletes had publicly committed to the event; however, by early 2026, several high-profile international competitors, including former world champion James Magnussen and British swimmer Emily Barclay, had expressed interest or confirmed their participation.

Magnussen said that other Australian swimmers had contacted him, expressing interest, and D'Souza says that the first TEG will include athletes from the 2024 Summer Olympics. The event has been dubbed the "steroid Olympics" by multiple media outlets.

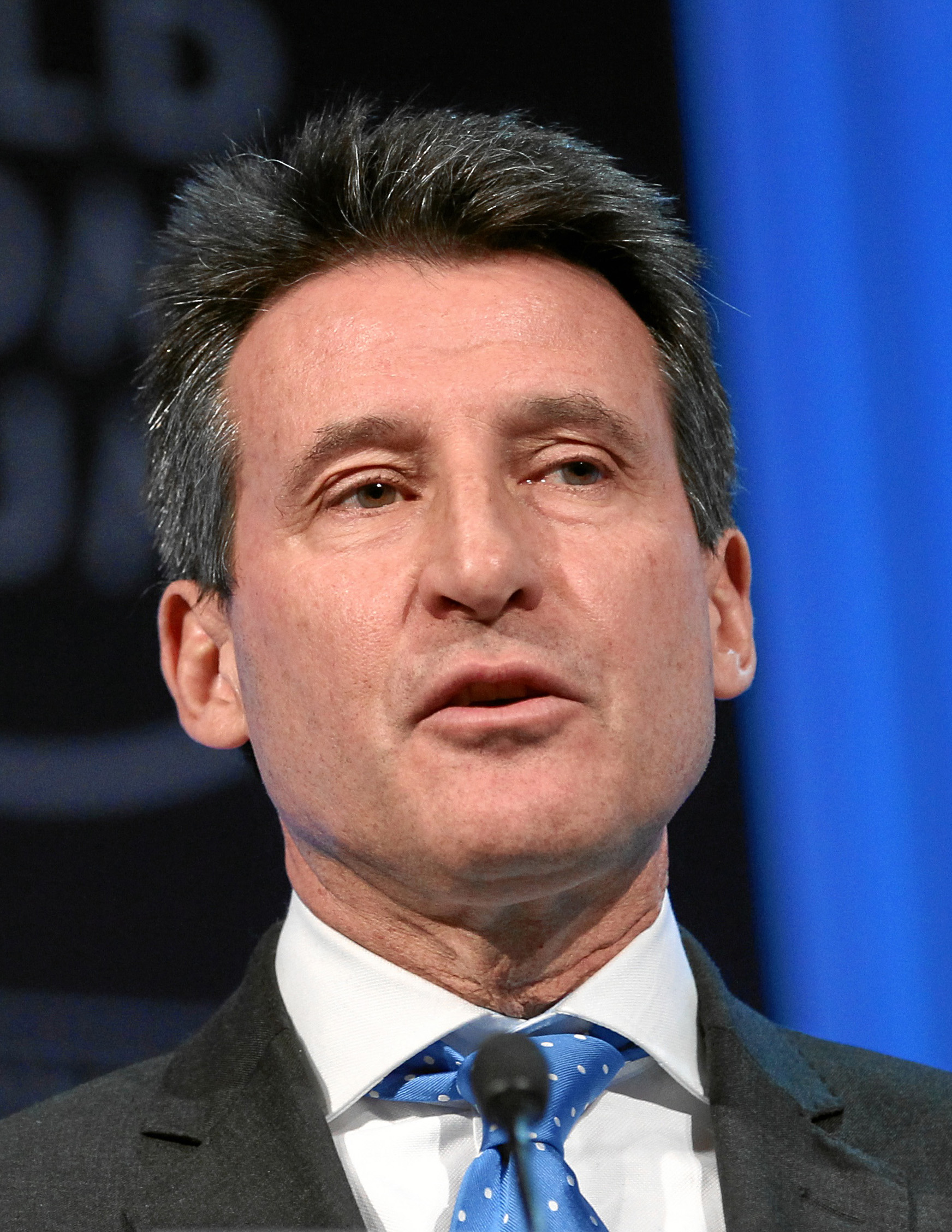
Sebastian Coe, president of World Athletics, said: "No one within athletics takes the Enhanced Games seriously."

=== Organizations ===
The IOC stated, "If you want to destroy any concept of fair play and fair competition in sport, this would be a good way to do it. ... This is completely at odds with the idea and values of the Olympic Games." Sebastian Coe, president of World Athletics, said, "No one within athletics takes the Enhanced Games seriously." WADA stated that it "warns athletes and support personnel, who wish to participate in clean sport, that if they were to take part in the Enhanced Games, they would risk committing anti-doping rule violations under the World Anti-Doping Code." WADA president Witold Bańka said TEG is a "ridiculous idea" and "very dangerous", and called for all anti-doping authorities to unite in opposition to the games.

World Aquatics stated, "The Enhanced Games are not a sporting competition built on universal values like honesty, fairness and equity: they are a circus, built on shortcuts". In June 2025, it announced that people involved in events like TEG would be banned from World Aquatics events. The International Federation of Sports Medicine expressed worry that TEG would exploit young people.

The Australian Olympic Committee called the idea "dangerous and irresponsible." The CEO of Sports Medicine Australia said that no member of the organization had expressed support for TEG in their capacity as healthcare professionals. The CEO of the Australian Sports Commission said, "I cannot see any responsible and ethical person thinking the Enhanced Games is even remotely sensible". A representative of the Swedish Olympic Committee said, "I see it as ill-conceived, short-sighted and foolhardy and something other than sport."

The UK Anti-Doping organisation said in a statement that "UKAD's mission is to protect sport from doping cheats. There is no place in sport for performance enhancing drugs, nor the Enhanced Games." Travis Tygart, CEO of the United States Anti-Doping Agency (USADA), said: "farcical … likely illegal in many [US] states" and "a dangerous clown show, not real sport." Rahul Gupta, director of the Office of National Drug Control Policy, stated that the Biden administration had deep concerns regarding TEG. The China Anti-Doping Agency (CHINADA) stated that it is in "firm opposition to any attempt to portray doping as so-called scientific advancements, and calls on the global sports community to stand united in rejecting the Enhanced Games."

TEG filed a lawsuit in the United States District Court for the Southern District of New York in Manhattan against several sporting bodies in August 2025, including World Aquatics and WADA. The allegation is that these organizations are violating anti-trust laws by preventing athletes from competing in TEG. United States District Judge Jesse Furman dismissed the lawsuit in a 33-page order in November 2025. The organization chose not to refile the lawsuit within the 30-day deadline, and the court closed the case.

=== Sportspeople ===
Cyclist and Olympic gold medalist Anna Meares said "Unfair, unsafe – I just don't think this is the right way to go about sport." Cyclist Joseph M. Papp, suspended for doping in 2006, referred to a 1988 Weekend Update skit, saying: "I don't think you'd actually see guys tearing their arms off ... A doping free-for-all just invites the most ambitious person to be the most reckless person, and to take the most drugs possible without literally killing themselves." Badminton player Susan Egelstaff stated, "It cannot, and will not work. The danger is massive." Swimmer and Olympic gold medalist Leisel Jones stated that while she would not participate herself due to the risks, she'd be interested in how fast people could get with doping, saying: "If this clears out people who ... are doing illegal things in sport, if that clears them out our clean sport, that would be wonderful."

Swimmer and Olympic gold medalist Libby Trickett said it was understandable TEG would attract fascination and interest, and that "I really, really, really hope that it's done under medical supervision because that's the only way I can kind of justify in my head something like this to go ahead." Olympic swimmer Mark Foster expressed similar views, noting also that money has attraction. Former Australian football player Adam Cooney stated, "I would say that 90–95 per cent of the population would put their hand up and do [what James Magnussen did], they're not going to get anywhere near a world record obviously, but it is pretty enticing."

Swimmer Kyle Chalmers, who declined joining TEG since he wants to compete in the 2028 Olympics, voiced support for retired swimmers like Magnussen if they wanted to join TEG. He said "I think that swimmers have been underpaid for a very long time at the big competitions."

=== Science and academia ===
Andy Miah, professor of science communication and future media at the University of Salford, called TEG a "provocation", saying that "... the significant risk of athletes excessively enhancing and risking significant health complications is unaddressed by their materials. There is no mention of medical oversight in the competition on the website, from what I can see." Fraser said that "Each athlete must be under clinical supervision." According to D'Souza, "We will focus on athlete safety by mandating athletes have pre-competition full-system clinical screenings including blood tests and EKGs." Science writer Ronald Bailey said, "Let fans decide which play they prefer." Grigory Rodchenkov, former head of the Moscow Anti-Doping Laboratory, said it was a "danger to health, to sport." Academic John William Devine said, "In a sporting world in which inequality of opportunity is already rampant, the removal of the doping ban would only deepen an existing moral failing." According to John Hoberman, author of several books on sports and doping, D'Souza's idea that drugs would lead to better performance is "very simplistic", and D'Souza is "very shallow on the scientific end". Anti-doping expert Michael Ashenden expressed support for the games in 2024, "provided their athletes do nothing illegal". Science philosopher Byron Hyde said that the large financial incentives offered by TEG risk coercing struggling athletes into participating, undermining their autonomy. However, he also observed that many other sports exhibit the same coercive structure, including boxing and MMA.

Writing in Performance Enhancement & Health in 2024, Dr. Andrew Richardson noted that while the international sporting community responded strongly to the Enhanced Games, academic literature has been more "tempered." Richardson said that the format could represent a shift in sports physiology research and suggested it might reduce social stigma for individuals disclosing performance-enhancing substance use. He further noted that some scholars have cautiously welcomed the concept, provided specific ethical and safety caveats are addressed.

=== Media ===
The Spectator opined that "In any discipline, we seek only to discover who is the fastest, or the strongest, the most accurate or the most coordinated. What's absolutely crucial, at least as far as retaining spectator interest goes, is that the advantage is natural." The Daily Telegraph's sports writer commented that "Remarkably it seems a more fleshed-out idea than the European Super League". Cyclist wondered who would be willing to sponsor the event, noting that as of late July 2023, no sponsors were mentioned on TEG's website.

Writing for The Globe and Mail, Alex Cyr said, "I will admit, I am incredibly curious to see an 'enhanced' person running faster than Usain Bolt, or swimming better than Michael Phelps. But I would not want to be that person, and I bet that neither will the serious athletes who have so far managed to avoid doping infractions." The Independent said that while the sporting world has been mostly dismissive, "D'Souza is intelligent and well-connected, and he has brought down big targets before. So when he says it's going to happen, he is deadly serious." The Sydney Morning Herald's sport columnist said that "the Enhanced Games are a dangerous, iniquitous concept." Outsports criticized D'Souza's use of LGBTQ language like "coming out" to describe athletes openly using performance-enhancing drugs. D'Souza is an out gay man.

OutKick's writer said in February 2025 "Humans LOVE modern gladiators accomplishing feats that none of us ever could. The Olympics can still have non-tainted records ... but that still shouldn't hurt someone taking legalized performance enhancing substances to try and absolutely RIP it out there in competition." Financial Times said the same month "A year on, with just one athlete publicly signed on to the project and no concrete plans for either a venue or a date, the project looks increasingly like a weird thought experiment, despite its high-profile backers. For D'Souza, the second Trump presidency could be what the Enhanced Games needs to get off the ground." The Times said in May 2025 "The Enhanced Games may be divisive, even dystopian to some. As far as D'Souza is concerned, they are the future — and the starting pistol is about to fire." Time listed D'Souza and Angermayer among the "Most Influential People in Health of 2025". The Economist said that the Games align with a growing human enhancement industry, aiming to improve strength, intelligence, and longevity.

== See also ==
- Goodwill Games
- History of sport
- Philosophy of sport
- Transhumanism
