= Economic voting =

Political science perspective emphasizing the role of the economy in voting decisions

In political science, economic voting is a theoretical perspective which argues that voter behavior is heavily influenced by the economic conditions in their country at the time of the election. According to the classical form of this perspective, voters tend to vote more in favor of the incumbent candidate and party when the economy is doing well than when it is doing poorly. This view has been supported by considerable empirical evidence. There is a substantial literature which shows that across the world's democracies, economic conditions shape electoral outcomes. Economic voting is less likely when it is harder for voters to attribute economic performance to specific parties and candidates.

Research on economic voting combines the disciplines of political science and economics using econometric techniques. Economic voting has been divided into several categories, including pocketbook voting (based on individual concerns) versus sociotropic voting (based on the economy at large), as well as retrospective voting (based on previous economic trends) versus prospective voting (based on expected future economic trends). Research conducted in the United States has indicated that, in presidential elections, American voters tend to be sociotropic and retrospective. However, when the incumbent candidate in a United States presidential election is not running, economic voter choice tends to be overwhelmingly prospective. One of the most prominent expressions of the economic voting perspective came when James Carville, the chief strategist for Bill Clinton's 1992 presidential campaign, placed a sign in the campaign office reading "It's the economy, stupid!". Research shows in the United States that voters punish the president's party in presidential, Senate, House, gubernatorial and state legislative elections when the local economy is doing poorly.

A 2021 study found evidence of economic voting in all U.S. presidential elections, all the way back to George Washington.
