= Neros =

American military drone manufacturer

Neros Technologies
- Type: Private
- Industry: Defense industry, Drone manufacturing
- Founded: 2023
- Founders: Soren Monroe-Anderson; Olaf Hichwa
- Headquarters: Torrance, California
- Key people: Soren Monroe-Anderson (CEO); Olaf Hichwa (CTO)
- Products: Archer Drone; Archer AI Drone; Crossbow Ground Control Station
- Website: www.neros.tech

Neros Technologies is an American defense technology company headquartered in Torrance, California. Established in 2023 by former drone racers Soren Monroe-Anderson and Olaf Hichwa, the company specializes in the design and manufacture of low-cost, expendable unmanned aerial vehicles (UAVs) for military applications. Its "Archer" drone is a mass-producible system designed to operate without reliance on supply chains from China.

== History ==
Neros was founded in 2023 by Soren Monroe-Anderson and Olaf Hichwa, who met in 2017 at a drone racing competition in Muncie, Indiana. Monroe-Anderson, a prominent drone racer, and Hichwa, a designer of custom circuit boards for racing drones, were motivated to start the company following the Russian invasion of Ukraine. Initially operating out of a garage, the founders began by building drones for Ukrainian forces using components sourced from China, personally delivering them to Kyiv in late 2023.

In order to address the strategic vulnerability of relying on Chinese supply chains, the pair moved operations to El Segundo, California, to develop a fully American-made drone platform. Now part of an aerospace and hard-tech industry hub locally known as "Gundo", the company attracted significant venture capital investment, raising approximately $370 million by late 2026 from firms including Sequoia Capital and Valor Equity Partners. The company was last valued at $2.5B

In November 2026, the Pentagon's Office of Strategic Capital signed a conditional loan commitment of up to $450M to Neros. This deal is intended to support Neros's domestic manufacturing expansion and reduce reliance on foreign-made components. In addition, Neros committed $165M in equity to this effort, bringing the total project size to $615M.

== Products ==
The company's primary product is the Archer, a small, quadcopter-style first-person view (FPV) drone designed for asymmetric warfare.

The Archer is a modular 5–10 in (130–250 mm) quadcopter capable of carrying a 1.5–7 lb (0.68–3.18 kg) payload with a range exceeding 15.3 miles (24.6 km). Unlike commercial drones like those made by DJI, which are often easy to fly but reliant on foreign components, the Archer is designed to be "attritable" (expendable) and resistant to electronic jamming. The drone utilizes low-cost, non-military grade chips, such as those used in parking meters, to keep production costs low while avoiding Chinese supply chains.

== Operations ==
Neros operates a manufacturing facility in Torrance, California, where it produces drones using manual assembly lines. As of late 2025, production rates were scaling rapidly: while The New York Times reported a monthly production of 2,000 units in November 2025, Bloomberg reported in August 2026 that output had reached around 1,200 drones per week. The company's workforce of over 250 employees includes former engineers from major aerospace and defense firms such as SpaceX, Palantir Technologies, and Anduril Industries.

The company emphasizes "hard-tech" manufacturing, distancing itself from the software-centric culture of Silicon Valley. Neros vertically integrates much of its production to ensure compliance with U.S. Department of Defense supply chain requirements, which prohibit Chinese components in critical defense systems.

== Contracts and deployments ==
Neros has secured several contracts with U.S. and international defense agencies. The U.S. Army selected Neros as a vendor for the "Purpose-Built Attritable Systems" program, aiming to supply low-cost drones. The U.S. Marine Corps awarded Neros a $17 million contract to supply thousands of drones. In Ukraine, Neros concluded a contract with the International Drone Coalition to supply 6,000 drones for use in the ongoing war with Russia.

In December 2024, Neros was placed on a sanctions list by the Chinese government, a designation the company described as a "badge of honor."

In July 2026, the US Army awarded Neros a $500M contract to supply its Archer FPV drones under the Purpose Built Attritable System (PBAS) program.
