= Clarium Capital =

Defunct American investment management and hedge fund company

Clarium Capital Management LLC

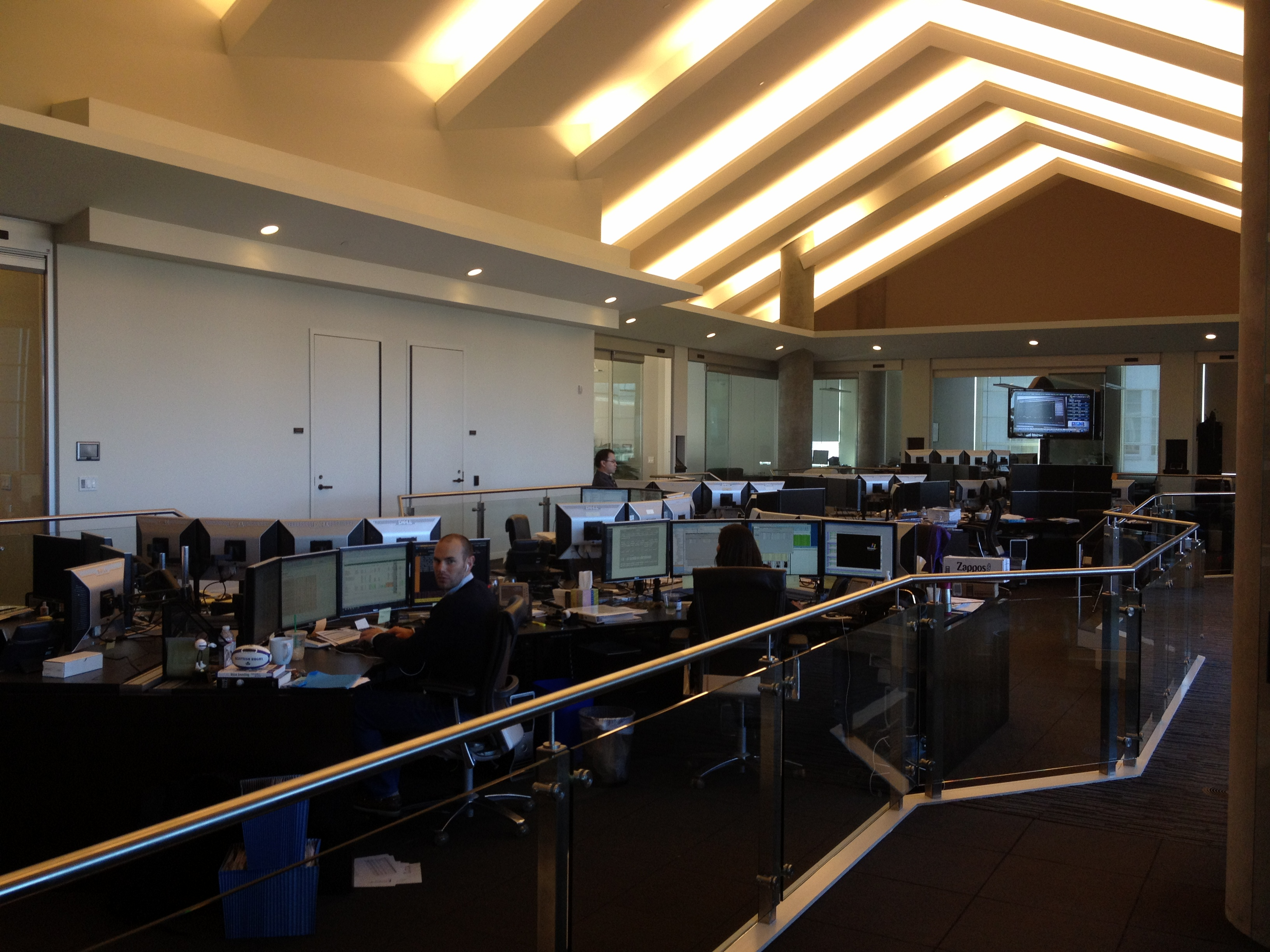
- Inside the Clarium Capital office
- Company type: Private
- Industry: Investment management
- Founded: 2002; 24 years ago
- Founder: Peter Thiel
- Defunct: 2013
- Headquarters: San Francisco, California, United States
- AUM: US$350 million
- Website: clarium.com at the Wayback Machine (archived 2008-07-24)

Clarium Capital Management LLC was an American investment management and hedge fund company pursuing a global macro strategy. It was founded in San Francisco in 2002 by Peter Thiel, co-founder of PayPal and early investor in Facebook. Its assets under management grew to $8 billion in 2008, after which a series of unprofitable investments and client redemptions shrank that to about $350 million as of 2011.

== Function and history ==
Clarium was an employee-owned firm that invests in public equity (primarily in micro-cap companies), fixed income, and hedging markets. Unlike most funds, which charge clients about a 2% management fee for their total assets invested and an additional 20% performance fee of the increase in the fund's net asset value, Clarium charged a 0% management fee and a performance fee of 25%.

The company stopped working while Thiel worked at PayPal and resumed in 2002. In 2008, Clarium moved its headquarters from San Francisco to New York City. In June 2010 Thiel closed the New York office to consolidate the company into one location at its San Francisco office. By 2011, the company had shrunk by 90%. It was considered defunct by 2013.

== Performance ==
=== 2002 ===
Clarium's 2002 performance, a series of correct bets in the energy markets that global demand would cause an oil shortage, was described by a 2009 Wall Street Journal article as "impressive".

=== 2008-2010 ===
Clarium was down 4.5% in 2008, down 25% in 2009, and down 23% in 2010. For the first half of 2008, the fund had a YTD return of 57.9%. At the start of 2008, the fund had $4 billion in assets under management (AUM), raised to $7.8 billion in June 2008, then dropped to $1.5 billion in July 2009, after investors withdrew money from the fund. It lost most of its value in 2008 on large bets that the US dollar would fall, and AUM reached $681 million in December 2010.
