= Megan Klimen =

American businesswoman

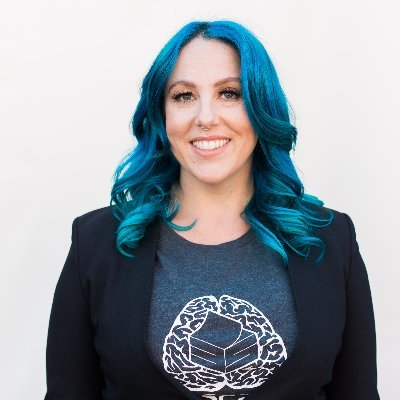
- Megan Klimen as COO at 3Scan
- Born: 1981 (age 44–45); Redwood City, California
- Occupation: Entrepreneur

Megan Klimen is an American entrepreneur, biotechnology executive, and advocate for decentralized scientific data storage. She is best known as one of the co-founders and chief operating officer of 3Scan and currently serves as the Founding Director of the Filecoin Foundation. Megan is a founding member of Women in Hardware, a member of the disaster aid group Synergy Strike Force and a co-founder of the unconference BIL Conference. Megan was a speaker at the World Economic Forum in 2022 and 2024.

She obtained a bachelor's of science degrees in Biology and in Anthropology from the University of California, San Diego in 2003.

== Early career and biohacking ==
Before co-founding 3Scan, Klimen was involved in the biohacking community in Silicon Valley. She was part of a group of women who were pushing boundaries in the field of DIY biology and self-experimentation.

=== BioCurious ===
Klimen was a board member of BioCurious, a community biology lab in Santa Clara, California. BioCurious was one of the first biohacking spaces in the world, providing a place for citizen scientists to experiment with biotechnology.

== Career ==
=== 3Scan ===
In 2011, Klimen co-founded 3Scan along with Todd Huffman, Matthew Goodman, and Cody Daniel. The company developed innovative technology for 3D analysis of cells, tissues, and organs, based on the Knife-edge scanning microscope (KESM) originally developed at Texas A&M University.

3Scan's technology revolutionized the histology workflow by automating the process of tissue sectioning and imaging. This allowed for the imaging and analysis of entire tissue samples rather than just a few representative slides, providing researchers with comprehensive 3D visualizations similar to CT scans. Klimen's role also included histology and sample preparation, leading her to describe herself as "Chief Officer of Squish."

Under Klimen's co-leadership, 3Scan raised a total of $22 million through two rounds of equity funding from various investors, including Lux Capital and Data Collective.

3Scan was acquired by the laboratory automation firm Strateos in 2019.

=== TEDMED ===
While chief operating officer of 3Scan, Klimen gave a talk about 3Scan technology at TEDMED entitled, "What if computers could map tissue the way they sequence genes?"

=== Filecoin Foundation ===
After 3Scan's acquisition, Klimen became the Founding Director of the Filecoin Foundation, which was created to support other projects contributing to the ecosystem of the decentralized web. As one of the heads of the foundation, she advocates for the use of decentralized storage solutions in scientific research.

==== Views on Scientific Data and Reproducibility ====
Klimen is a vocal advocate for addressing the replication crisis in science. She cites several concerning statistics about the reproducibility of scientific experiments and the prevalence of fabricated or plagiarized research papers:

- A 2016 report in Nature showed that 70% of researchers tried and failed to reproduce another scientist's experiment.
- A 2023 report suggested that 28% of all biomedical papers published in the field are either fabricated or completely plagiarized.
- In a study by Amgen, one of the world's largest biotech companies, they failed to reproduce results from 53 landmark cancer research papers, with only six results being reproducible

==== Advocacy for Decentralized Data Storage ====
Klimen promotes the use of Filecoin, a decentralized storage network, as a solution for scientific data storage and sharing. She argues that this approach can help address issues of data reproducibility, security, and accessibility in scientific research.

Through her work with the Filecoin Foundation, Klimen has been involved in partnerships with various scientific institutions and initiatives to implement decentralized data storage solutions, including projects in genomics, cardiac research, particle physics, and geospatial data analysis.

=== Synergy Strike Force ===
Klimen was a regular visitor to Jalalabad, in Afghanistan, where she worked with other technology workers affiliated with an informal group known as the Synergy Strike Force, using technology to help improve the quality of life for Afghan civilians and training them in the use of peaceful technologies such as computers and wireless internet, including the FabFi network. The group assisted in the FabLab project in Afghanistan.

The funding for the Synergy Strike Force primarily came from DARPA's More Eyes program.

=== BIL Conference ===
Klimen is a co-founder of the BIL Conference, an unconference organized and observed by the participants as an unaffiliated counterpart to TED’s structured, ‘invite-only’ paid conference.
