= Todd Huffman =

American inventor and photographer

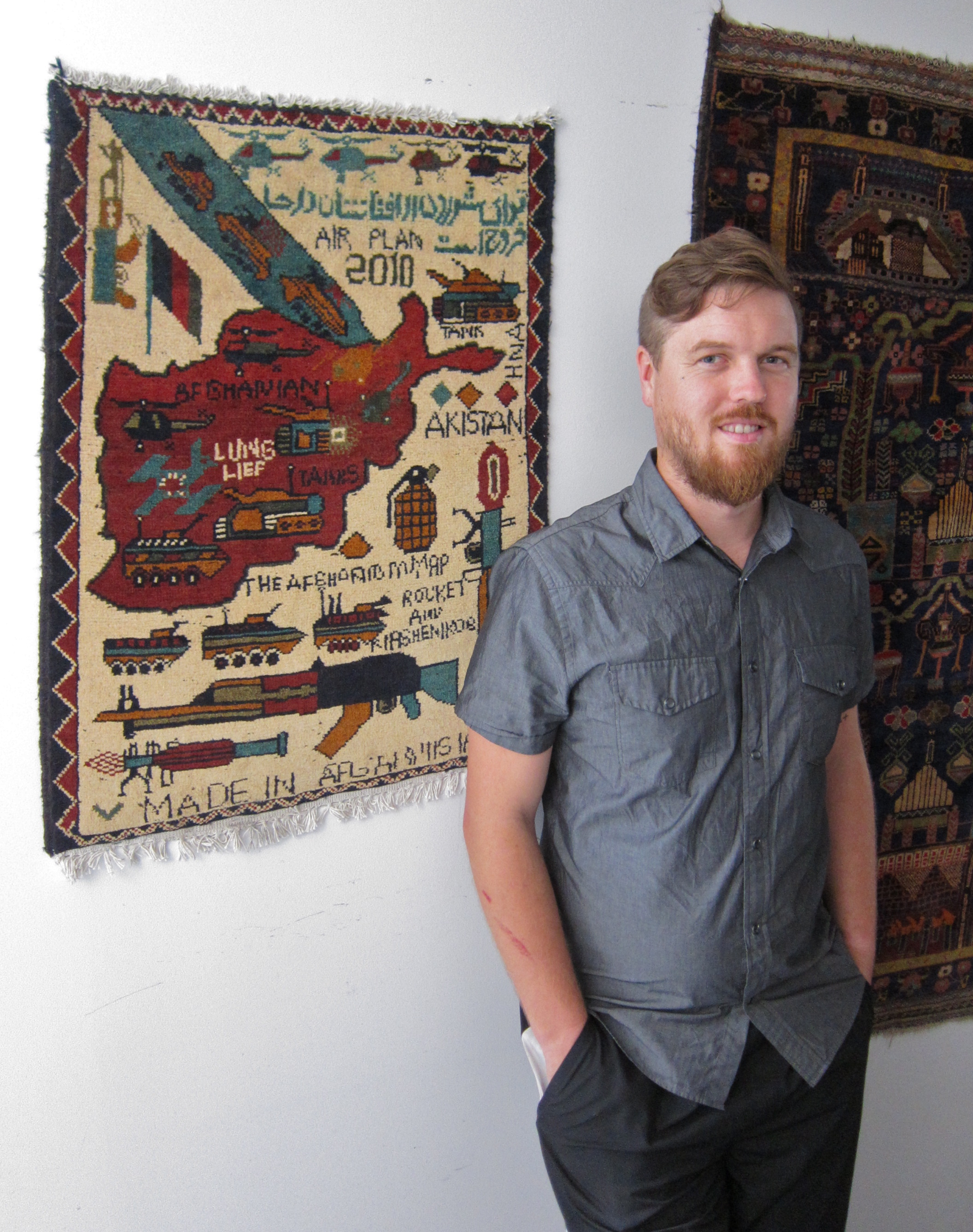
- Born: 1980 (age 45–46); Long Beach, California
- Occupations: Computer Scientist, inventor, photographer

Todd Huffman is an American technology entrepreneur, transhumanist and photographer. He was co-founder of the biomedical imaging company 3Scan, member of the disaster aid group Synergy Strike Force, signals intelligence researcher for DARPA, co-founder of the "unconference" BIL Conference, and co-founder and former CEO of E11 bio.

He obtained a B.S. in Neuroscience in 2003 from California State University, Long Beach, and an M.S. in Computational Biosciences at Arizona State University in 2006.

== Career ==
=== Alcor Life Extension Foundation ===
While attending college at California State University, Long Beach (CSULB), Huffman became interested in cryopreservation, the process of cryogenically preserving brains with the intent of reviving it in the future once the technology becomes available, after reading about the subject on the Extropy Institute's mailing list. After networking with clients of the cryonics service provider Alcor Life Extension Foundation that he met through an Extropian conference, Huffman signed up for the service in 2002.

After graduating from CSULB in 2003, Huffman joined Alcor full-time as a researcher and a field recovery technician preparing brains for preservation at the site of death. After starting graduate school Huffman left his full-time position at Alcor, but continued to consult for the organization as well as another cryonics company, Suspended Animation, Inc.

Huffman has a tattoo on his torso with instructions for how to prepare his body for freezing in the event of his death.

=== BIL Conference ===
In 2008, Huffman co-founded the BIL Conference, an "unconference" organized and observed by the participants as an unaffiliated counterpart to TED’s structured, ‘invite-only’ paid conference.

=== Timothy Leary Archives ===
Huffman has served as a board member for the Timothy Leary Archives.

=== Humanity+ ===
In January 2009, Huffman was elected to the board of directors of Humanity+, an organization dedicated to the promotion of transhumanism, an ideology that promotes enhance longevity, cognition, physical performance, and well-being of humans through technology.

At the 2012 conference for Humanity+, Huffman gave a presentation on the microscopy technology being developed by his company 3Scan.

=== Disaster Response ===
Starting in 2007, Huffman has worked with a variety of organizations on technologies for use in response to disasters or in conflict. He was a member of the disaster aid group Synergy Strike Force, a volunteer for the Humanitarian OpenStreetMap Team, and a researcher for DARPA.

Huffman was a active in Jalalabad, in Afghanistan, where he worked with other technology workers affiliated with an informal group known as the Synergy Strike Force, using technology to help improve the quality of life for Afghan civilians and training them in the use of peaceful technologies such as computers and wireless internet, including the FabFi network. The group assisted in the FabLab project in Afghanistan.

Huffman helped coordinate improvements to the OpenStreetMap efforts in Afghanistan and Haiti after the 2010 earthquake. He coordinated large scale data imports of aerial imagery provided by the US State Department and Harvard Humanitarian Initiative, coordinated licensing updates to existing road databases, and led on-the-ground training sessions for local users to update OpenStreetMap.

Sharon Weinberger, author of a book about DARPA entitled The Imagineers of War, described Huffman influencing DARPA decision-makers on the use of technology in conflict.

=== IST Research ===
Huffman is a co-founder of defense contractor IST Research and served as Vice-President.. IST Research was acquired by The Carlyle Group, the sixth largest private equity firm, in 2021. IST Research is a leading provider of open source data collection, population engagement, and content discovery solutions primarily for U.S. Government customers. IST Research provides access to hard-to-reach populations at scale through a proprietary technology platform, which enables customers to collect open source information and engage populations across various media channels.

=== Writing ===
In 2015, Huffman contributed a passage to disinformation researcher Renée DiResta's book The Hardware Startup on how to secure DARPA grants.

=== 3Scan ===
In 2011, Huffman co-founded 3Scan, a firm that develops new techniques for biomedical imaging. Biz Journals called 3Scan's main technology, the Knife-edge scanning microscope, a "robotic microscope." The microscope rapidly sections and scans samples, building 3d models of microscopic structures. Singularity Hub magazine quoted Huffman's description of their goal: “We’re trying to move from a world where humans are hunting and pecking through tissue looking for answers to a world where we generate large and reproducible data sets where we can use analytics to drive insights and real cures.”

In January 2015, Forbes magazine interviewed Huffman, asking him to explain the approach to technology his firm was taking. In July 2016, Biz Journals reported that venture capital firms had invested an additional $11 million in 3Scan, reporting the total as $21 million.

3Scan was acquired by the laboratory automation firm Strateos in 2019.

=== MobileCoin ===
In 2017, Huffman co-founded the cryptocurrency firm MobileCoin and served on the Board of Directors. In July 2020, the company was announced that Renee DiResta whose book Huffman contributed a passage to would be joining the board of the MobileCoin foundation.
