= Peter Thiel =

American entrepreneur and venture capitalist (born 1967)

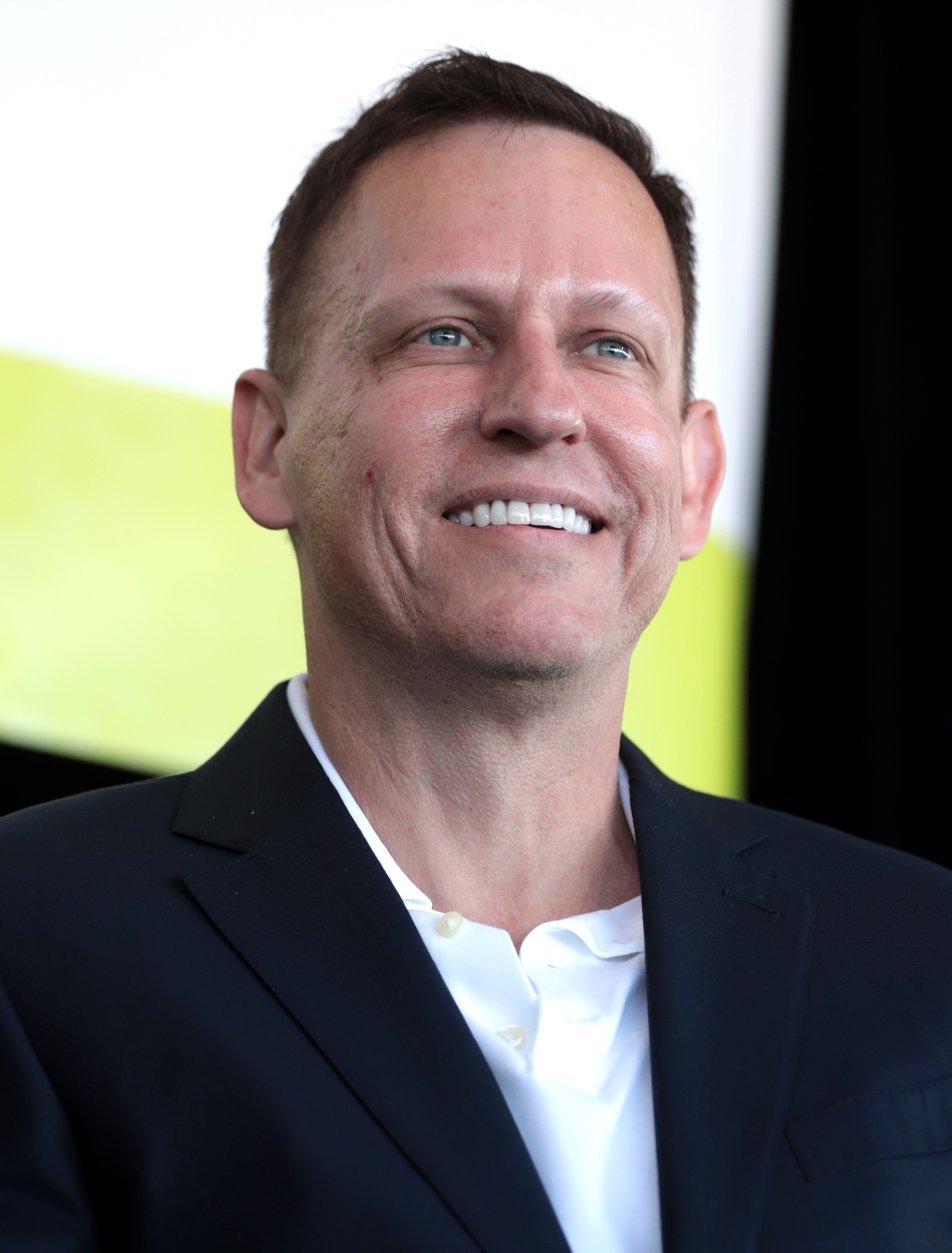
- Thiel in 2022
- Born: Peter Andreas Thiel; 11 October 1967 (age 59); Frankfurt, West Germany
- Citizenship: Germany; United States; New Zealand
- Education: Stanford University (BA, JD)
- Occupations: Businessman; entrepreneur; venture capitalist
- Title: President of Clarium Capital; Chairman of Palantir; Partner in Founders Fund; President of Thiel Capital; Chairman of Valar Ventures; Chair of Mithril Capital
- Political party: Republican
- Spouse: Matt Danzeisen (m. 2017)

Peter Andreas Thiel (/tiːl/; born 11 October 1967) is a German-American entrepreneur, venture capitalist, and political activist. A co-founder of PayPal, Palantir Technologies and Founders Fund, he was also the first outside investor in Facebook. As of October 2026, Forbes estimated Thiel's net worth at US$37.7 billion.

Born in Germany, Thiel moved to the US with his parents when he was an infant. In 1971, his family moved to South African-occupied Namibia, before moving back to the US in 1977. After graduating from Stanford University, Thiel worked as a clerk, a securities lawyer, a speechwriter, and a derivatives trader at Credit Suisse. He founded Thiel Capital Management in 1996 and co-founded PayPal with Max Levchin and Luke Nosek in 1998. He was PayPal's chief executive officer until its sale to eBay in 2002 for $1.5 billion.

Thiel then founded Clarium Capital, a global macro hedge fund based in San Francisco. He launched Palantir in 2003, a big data analysis company, and has been its chairman since then. In August 2004, Thiel became Facebook's first outside investor by acquiring a 10.2% stake in the company for $500,000. In 2005, he launched Founders Fund with PayPal partners Ken Howery and Luke Nosek. He co-founded Valar Ventures in 2010, founded Thiel Capital in 2011, co-founded Mithril Capital in 2012, was investment committee chair in 2012, and was a part-time partner at Y Combinator from 2015 to 2017. He was granted New Zealand citizenship in 2011, which became controversial when made public in 2017. Through the Thiel Foundation, he governs the grant-making bodies Breakout Labs and Thiel Fellowship.

Thiel has been variously portrayed as a conservative libertarian and democracy-skeptic authoritarian, and he has made substantial donations to American right-wing figures and causes. Commentators and scholars frequently examine his views, particularly his political and ideological positions. (Note: Historian Barbara Stollberg-Rilinger: "Eine technologisch perfektionierte Welt wäre eine moralfreie und im wörtlichen Sinne verantwortungslose Welt". Translated: "A technologically perfected world would be a world devoid of morality and, in the literal sense, without responsibility.") He has been described as "a political theologian operating at the heart of the Silicon Valley" and the "intellectual architect of Silicon Valley's contemporary ethos".

== Early life ==
Peter Andreas Thiel was born in Frankfurt am Main, Hesse on 11 October 1967, to Klaus Friedrich Thiel and Susanne Thiel. The family migrated to the United States when Peter was one year old and lived in Cleveland, Ohio, where his father worked as a chemical engineer. Thiel's biographer Max Chafkin comments that leaving the booming Frankfurt, which was West Germany's financial capital, for Cleveland, which was representative of the American countercurrent, had an impact on the family. Klaus worked for various mining companies, which created an itinerant upbringing for Thiel and his younger brother, Patrick Michael Thiel. Thiel and his mother later naturalized as U.S. citizens, whereas his father did not.

Before settling in Foster City, California, in 1977, the Thiel family lived in South Africa and South West Africa (modern-day Namibia) in the time of apartheid. Peter changed elementary schools seven times. He attended a German-language school in Swakopmund for two years that required students to wear uniforms and employed corporal punishment, such as striking students' hands with a ruler. He said this experience instilled a distaste for uniformity and regimentation later reflected in his support for individualism and libertarianism. The German community in Swakopmund was known at the time for its continued glorification of Nazism. Thiel was noted as a smart, but lonely, withdrawn boy, with whom others would not mingle because they knew he would not stay long in the town.

Thiel played Dungeons & Dragons and was an avid reader of science fiction, with Isaac Asimov and Robert A. Heinlein among his favorite authors. He is a fan of J. R. R. Tolkien's works, stating as an adult that he had read The Lord of the Rings more than 10 times.

Thiel excelled in mathematics and scored first in a California-wide mathematics competition while attending Bowditch Middle School in Foster City. At San Mateo High School, he read Ayn Rand and, influenced by his parents, admired Nixon and Reagan. He was valedictorian of his graduating class in 1985. When at school, he reportedly charged $500 each to take the SAT for underclassmen, knowing this would cost him his spot at Stanford if discovered.

Thiel studied philosophy at Stanford University. The replacement of a "Western Culture" program at Stanford with a "Culture, Ideas and Values" course that addressed diversity and multiculturalism prompted Thiel to co-found The Stanford Review, a conservative and libertarian newspaper, in 1987. The paper received funding from Irving Kristol. Thiel was The Stanford Review's first editor-in-chief until he graduated in 1989. Thiel has maintained his relationship with the paper, consulting with staff and donating to the newspaper. According to Marc Andreessen, Thiel's time at the Review marked the beginning of a career-long strategy: using provocative verbal cues – later delivered through talks, books and mottos – as a way to attract capable individuals to his projects, preferring this method over actively seeking out talent. The Review has spawned a large network of industry leaders, among whom Andrew Granato and the Fortune respectively identify around 300 people who have worked for or received investment from Peter Thiel or Joe Lonsdale, another prominent editor-in-chief and Thiel's mentee. A number of Review alumni have also become public officials, beginning with Jay Bhattacharya and Paula M. Stannard, who were editors during Thiel's time as editor-in-chief.

After graduation, Thiel attended Stanford Law School, graduating in 1992 with a Juris Doctor degree. While at Stanford, Thiel met René Girard, whose mimetic theory influenced him.

== Career ==
=== Early career ===
After graduating from Stanford Law School, Thiel was a law clerk to Judge James Larry Edmondson of the U.S. Court of Appeals for the Eleventh Circuit from 1992 to 1993. Thiel then worked as a securities lawyer for Sullivan & Cromwell in New York. He left the law firm in under a year. He then took a job as a derivatives trader in currency options at Credit Suisse in 1993 while also working as a speechwriter for former United States secretary of education William Bennett. Thiel returned to California in 1996.

Upon returning to the Bay Area, Thiel capitalized on the dot-com boom. With financial support from friends and family, he raised $1 million toward the establishment of Thiel Capital Management and embarked on his venture capital career. Early on, he experienced a setback after investing $100,000 in his friend Luke Nosek's unsuccessful web-based calendar project. Soon thereafter, Nosek's friend Max Levchin described to Thiel his cryptography-related company idea, which became their first venture called Fieldlink (later renamed Confinity) in 1998.

=== PayPal ===
Thiel provided the initial $100,000 for Fieldlink in 1998. In February 1999, they raised $500,000 largely from friends and family ($35,000 was from Thiel's parents). By middle 1999, they raised $4.5 million, with Nokia Ventures contributing $3 million.

With Confinity, Thiel realized they could develop software to bridge a gap in making online payments. Although the use of credit cards and expanding automated teller machine networks provided consumers with more payment options, not all merchants had the necessary hardware to accept credit cards. Thus, consumers had to pay with exact cash or check. Thiel wanted to create a type of digital wallet for consumer convenience and security by encrypting data on digital devices, and in 1999 Confinity launched PayPal.

PayPal promised to open up new possibilities for handling money. Thiel viewed PayPal's mission as liberating people from the erosion of the value of their currencies due to inflation. (Note: Peter Thiel: "Everyone in the world needs money – to get paid, to trade, to live. Paper money is an ancient technology and an inconvenient means of payment. You can run out of it. It wears out. It can get lost or stolen. In the twenty-first century, people need a form of money that's more convenient and secure, something that can be accessed from anywhere with a PDA or an Internet connection. Of course, what we're calling 'convenient' for American users will be revolutionary for the developing world. Many of these countries' governments play fast and loose with their currencies. They use inflation and sometimes wholesale currency devaluations, like we saw in Russia and several Southeast Asian countries last year, to take wealth away from their citizens. Most of the ordinary people there never have an opportunity to open an offshore account or to get their hands on more than a few bills of a stable currency like U.S. dollars. Eventually PayPal will be able to change this. In the future, when we make our service available outside the U.S. and as Internet penetration continues to expand to all economic tiers of people, PayPal will give citizens worldwide more direct control over their currencies than they ever had before. It will be nearly impossible for corrupt governments to steal wealth from their people through their old means because if they try the people will switch to dollars or Pounds or Yen, in effect dumping the worthless local currency for something more secure.")

When PayPal launched at a press conference in 1999, representatives from Nokia and Deutsche Bank sent $3 million in venture funding to Thiel using PayPal on their PalmPilots. PayPal then continued to grow through mergers in 2000 with Elon Musk's online financial services company X.com, and with Pixo, a company specializing in mobile commerce. These mergers allowed PayPal to expand into the wireless phone market and transformed it into a safer and more user-friendly tool by enabling users to transfer money via a free online registration and email rather than by exchanging bank account information. PayPal went public on 15 February 2002 and was bought by eBay for $1.5 billion in October of that year. Thiel remained CEO of the company until the sale. His 3.7% stake in the company was worth $55 million at the time of acquisition. In Silicon Valley circles, Thiel is colloquially referred to as the "Don of the PayPal Mafia".

=== Clarium Capital ===
Thiel used $10 million of his proceeds to create Clarium Capital Management, a global macro hedge fund focusing on directional and liquid instruments in currencies, interest rates, commodities, and equities. Thiel stated that "the big, macroeconomic idea that we had at Clarium—the idée fixe—was the peak-oil theory, which was basically that the world was running out of oil, and that there were no easy alternatives."

In 2003, Thiel successfully bet that the United States dollar would weaken. In 2004, Thiel spoke of the dot-com bubble having migrated, in effect, into a growing bubble in the financial sector, and specified General Electric and Walmart as vulnerable. In 2005, Clarium saw a 57.1% return as Thiel predicted that the dollar would rally.

However, Clarium faltered in 2006 with a 7.8% loss. Thereafter, the firm sought to profit in the long term from its petrodollar analysis, which foresaw the impending decline in oil supplies. Clarium's assets under management grew after achieving a 40.3% return in 2007 to more than $7 billion by the first quarter of 2008, but fell later in the year and again in 2009 after financial markets collapsed. By 2011, after missing out on the economic rebound, many key investors pulled out, reducing the value of Clarium's assets to $350 million, two-thirds of which was Thiel's money.

=== Palantir ===
Palantir Technologies, a big data analysis company named after the Tolkien artifact, was formed as a reaction to the September 11 attacks, largely building on PayPal's anti-fraud technology. Thiel stated that the attacks opened the way for all sorts of draconian policies, so the best method would be providing cutting-edge technology with built-in policing systems to ensure the state uses its power legally. Analyst Christopher Soghoian later commented that Palantir does provide these policing systems, but the state can turn them off.

In May 2003, Thiel incorporated Palantir. He serves as chairman of the company.

According to The Wall Street Journal, when Palantir launched in 2004, there were three investors other than Thiel and Alex Karp but little interest from venture capital firms, so Thiel and his venture fund largely bankrolled the initial $30 million cost. CIA-affiliated venture capital firm In-Q-Tel invested about $2 million. According to Techcrunch, Oakhouse Partners led Palantir's $7.5 million Series A (June 2006) and REV led its $10.5 million Series B (November 2006). In its early years, Palantir maintained founder control by declining to offer board seats to investors, including In-Q-Tel. This practice continued through subsequent funding rounds.

Some commentators have said that many conspiracy theories about Palantir have arisen, partly due to the CIA's early involvement and Palantir's initial focus on intelligence contracts with organizations including the FBI, CIA, and NSA, but also partly because the founders, including Thiel and Karp, deliberately crafted an image that exaggerated Palantir's relationship with the CIA or its capacity during its early phase.

Although the software only analyzes data collected by the customers, some criticize it for enabling surveillance. (Note: Wired: "Palantir is often called a data broker, a data miner, or a giant database of personal information. In reality, it's none of these [...] Customers need to already have the data they want to work with—Palantir itself does not provide any.") Professor Vasilis Galis notes that the software is not a mere tool, but shapes policing culture with new policing norms. (Note: Vasilis Galis, Professor in science and technology studies at the IT University of Copenhagen: "When Palantir Technologies customized the Gotham platform into POL-INTEL, a data integration and analysis platform purchased and used by the Danish police, it also enforced a new ontology that simultaneously shaped the police organization and policing practices. [...] The basis for Palantir's E-ontology derives from such political notions and is explicitly performed by the company's own under-standing of its products: 'software as much as anything else is a product of the legal and moral order from which it stems and plays a role in defending it' (Palantir,2022a).")

Today, the company specializes in defense but has an expanding commercial sector.

According to Geoff Shullenberger (managing director of Compact) and Moira Weigel (Assistant Professor of Comparative Literature, Harvard), Peter Thiel and Alex Karp built Palantir on the basis of their understanding of Leo Strauss and the Frankfurt School.

=== Facebook ===
After the first meeting with Zuckerberg in August 2004, Thiel made a $500,000 angel investment in the startup (then "a three-person dormroom") for a 10.2% stake in the company and joined Facebook's board. This was the first outside investment in Facebook and valued the company at $4.9 million. He also bought Zuckerberg a car. The investment was originally in the form of a convertible note, to be converted to equity if Facebook reached 1.5 million users by the end of 2004. Although Facebook narrowly missed the target, Thiel allowed the loan to be converted to equity anyway. Thiel said of his investment: "I was comfortable with them pursuing their original vision. And it was a very reasonable valuation. I thought it was going to be a pretty safe investment."

Facebook employees reported that Thiel's influence was unusual for a board member who was not also the CEO. Some criticized Thiel for pushing his mentee Zuckerberg and the company to the right. Zuckerberg credited Thiel with helping him time Facebook's 2007 Series D, which closed before the 2008 financial crisis.

Facebook's initial public offering was in May 2012, with a market cap of nearly $100 billion ($38 a share), at which time Thiel sold 16.8 million shares for $638 million. In August 2012, immediately upon the conclusion of the early investor lock-up period, Thiel sold almost all of his remaining stake for between $19.27 and $20.69 per share, or $395.8 million, for a total of more than $1 billion. As of April 2020, he owned less than 10,000 shares in Facebook.

On 7 February 2022, Thiel announced he would not stand for re-election to the board of Facebook owner Meta at the 2022 annual stockholders' meeting and would leave after 17 years in order to support pro–Donald Trump candidates in the 2022 United States elections.

=== Founders Fund ===
In 2005, Thiel created Founders Fund, a San Francisco-based venture capital fund. Other partners in the fund include Sean Parker, Ken Howery, and Luke Nosek.

The fund focuses on defense-related startups and technology. After Facebook, even though it was a big financial success, Thiel made the Founders Fund pivot to hard tech, with the reasoning that while companies like Twitter might have a high value, they would not take "civilization to the next level." The Economist notes that the fund and Thiel, personally, have a history of incubating startups that do hypersensitive work related to national security. The fund casts Palantir, Anduril and the newly minted nuclear startup General Matter as the three parts of a trilogy, to which it hopes to add others, among which is a plan for onshoring ultraviolet light lithography.

Business Insider reports that, among Thiel's inner circle (who know well the billionaire's fondness for Tolkien's works), the fund is nicknamed "the Precious", in reference to the One Ring of Sauron.

In addition to Facebook, the Founders Fund made early-stage investments in numerous startups, including Airbnb, Slide.com, LinkedIn, Friendster, RapLeaf, Geni.com, Yammer, Spotify, Practice Fusion, MetaMed, Vator, SpaceX, IronPort, Votizen, Asana, Big Think, CapLinked, Nanotronics Imaging, Powerset (Thiel is on the board of Nanotronics and Powerset), Stripe, Bullish Global (the parent company Block.one had also received investment from Thiel), AltSchool, Trade Republic, PsiQuantum (photonic quantum computing), and Rigetti Computing (superconducting quantum computing). Thiel also backed DeepMind, a UK start-up that was acquired by Google in early 2014 for £400 million. Founders Fund is an important backer of the Berlin-based platform ResearchGate.

Since 2012, Founders Fund had been quietly buying bitcoin, with the investment totaling around $20 million" (Bloomberg remarked that, "the investment amounts to a rounding error for Thiel's firm."). The company sold the majority of its crypto holdings for $1.8 billion in March 2022 (with bitcoin making up two-thirds of its holdings), right before the market crashed.

Also in 2017, Thiel was one of the first outside investors in Clearview AI, a facial recognition technology startup that has raised concerns in the tech world and media for its risks of weaponization.

In 2024, alongside General Catalyst and Red Cell Partners, the Founders Fund incubated the defense incubator Valinor Enterprises. The co-founders are former Palantir's senior vice president Julie Bush (CEO), Trae Stephens, General Catalyst's Paul Kwan and Red Cell's Grant Verstandig. That same year, the Founders Fund also led a massive US$85 million seed round for the UAE's decentralized, open-source AI platform SentientAGI (Sentient Foundation), which seeks to challenge Perplexity and OpenAI's closed models as well as handle the problem of AI proliferation, which concentrates power in the hands of large players like Google and Amazon. In 2024, it also invested in Impulse Space (in-space transportation services), Ramp, and Crusoe (AI infrastructure using clean energy).

In 2025, the Founders Fund invests in Erebor (a new digital bank which is founded by Palmer Luckey and has quickly reached a US$2 billion valuation), EnduroSat (Bulgarian startup that produces Gen3 satellites at scale), Varda (space medicine and hypersonic testbed startup, founded by the Thiel Fellow Delian Asparouhov, Trae Stephens and Will Bruey, and incubated at the Founders Fund), Hadrian Automation.

In 2026, the fund co-led investments in Amsterdam-based defense startup Onodrim (launched by Palantir alumni) and AI startup Arda (led by former OpenAI executive Bob McGrew), both of which bear Tolkien-themed names. It also backed the ocean data center startup Panthalassa, with Thiel leading the round personally.

==== Anduril Industries ====
Anduril is a defense hardware startup that was founded in 2017 by Palmer Luckey (who is Thiel's mentee), Joe Chen, Trae Stephens, Matt Grimm and Brian Schimpf (the latter three are Palantir and Founders Fund alumni). The Founders Fund backed the company since its inception, leading its 2017 seed round. The $1 billion (part of the $2.5 billion Series G funding round) the Founders Fund invested in Anduril in June 2025 was the largest investment in the fund's history. In December 2024, it was reported that Palantir and Anduril were forming a consortium of new generation defense companies (which included SpaceX, OpenAI, Scale AI, Saronic Technologies and others) that they would lead in order to challenge the dominance of traditional defense companies. In July 2025, when the Trump administration's budget bill included a provision that required border surveillance towers to be "tested and accepted by U.S. Customs and Border Protection to deliver autonomous capabilities", Edith Olmsted of The New Republic made the criticism that the government favoured Peter Thiel's business, as the provision (which only Anduril fulfilled) effectively ruled out Anduril's rivals, namely General Dynamics and the Israeli-based Elbit Systems.

==== General Matter ====
General Matter emerged from stealth in April 2025, focusing on "production and handling of High-Assay, Low-Enriched Uranium (HALEU)." Scott Nolan, who formerly worked for SpaceX, left the Founders Fund to focus on the company and become the CEO, Thiel is also on the company's board of directors, which is noted by the Economist to be a rare occurrence these days. The plant in Paducah, built by General Matter, will be the "first privately developed US uranium enrichment facility".

=== Valar Ventures ===
Valar Ventures is an internationally focused venture firm Thiel cofounded with Andrew McCormack and James Fitzgerald in 2010. Valar's portfolio includes TransferWise (now Wise), reforestation-funding finance platform Treecard, fintech startup Atoa (Wise, Treecard and Atoa are based in London), Miami-headquartered Novo and Fortú (digital bank which focuses on underbanked Latino and Hispanic communities), fintech unicorn Qonto, fintech startup Hero, accounting automation software startup Regate (all three are Paris-based), Vienna-based crypto unicorn Bitpanda, Lagos- and London-based banking startup Kuda Bank, Indonesian fintech startup Bukuwarung, Nigerian banking platform Maplerad, Mexican banking startup Albo, banking unicorn N26, B2B paytech Mondu, spend management platform Moss, tax filling unicorn Taxfix, instant payment API startup Ivy (N26, Mondu, Moss, Taxfix and Ivy are all Berlin-based; Ivy is founded by the Thiel Fellow Ferdinand Dabitz), Dubai-based fintech startup Baraka. Valar also invested in New-Zealand based companies including in the software firm Xero, undersea communication company Pacific Fibre and e-reader platform Booktrack.

Recent investments include Arkansas-based Panacea Financial (digital fintech for medical practitioners), Riyadh-based SILQ ("largest B2B commerce platform across the Gulf and South Asia", resulted from the recent merger between Bangladesh-based Shop-Up and Saudi-based Sary), Canadian startup Neo (fintech), London-based fertility care startup Gaia.

=== Thiel Capital ===
Thiel Capital is a venture capital fund founded by Thiel in 2011 and based in Los Angeles, also referred to as Thiel's family office. It provides "strategic and operational support" for many of Peter Thiel's initiatives and ventures. It incubated and launched Founders Fund, Mithril, Valar, the Thiel Fellowship and Breakout Labs, and also sponsors Crescendo Equity Partners.

The firm's investments include Alloy Therapeutics (with Founders Fund and 8VC), EnClear Therapies (Jason Camm became a board member in 2020), the German unicorn ATAI Life Sciences (found by Thiel's friend, the biotech billionaire Christian Angermayer; Jason Camm also became a director in 2020), Compass Pathways (also partly owned by ATAI), Pilgrim (dual-use biotech startup founded by Thiel Fellow Jake Adler), Hugoboom, Rhea, Bullish Global (Founders Fund and Angermeyer are also investors), FTX (also received investment from Rivendell LLC), QA Wolf, Rollup (software platform to develop complex hardware), Neros (military drone startup found by Thiel Fellow Soren Monroe-Anderson), Regent Craft (electric seaglider, invested together with Founders Fund). Thiel Capital is also an investor (including post-IPO financial investment as major backer) of the dual-use German laser communications startup Mynaric. Angermayer also backs Mynaric.

Hugoboom's app 28 requires users to input the first day of their last period to calculate the menstrual phases. The app's pro-life rhetoric and scientific basis is controversial.

Some of the firm's notable (past) employees include former Austrian chancellor Sebastian Kurz, American politician and entrepreneur Blake Masters, Kevin Harrington (Senior Director for Strategic Planning at the United States National Security Council) and Michael Kratsios.

Thiel Capital's investment in the Gilching-based drone startup Quantum-Systems as well as Thiel's subsequent backing of the Berlin-based attack drone startup Stark are sometimes considered controversial, due to Thiel's politics. In May 2025, Quantum-Systems became Europe's first dual-use unicorn and third defense unicorn, after fellow Bavarian startup Helsing and the Portuguese Tekever (Thiel has a role in the success of Helsing too and the startup is considered a part of the "Thiel ecosystem", although he does not directly invest in it). Thiel's mentee Moritz Döpfner brokered the deal with Quantum-Systems on Thiel's behalf and sits on its board. His venture fund Doepfner Capital also invests in Stark.

=== Mithril Capital ===
In June 2012, he launched Mithril Capital Management, named after the fictitious metal in The Lord of the Rings, with Jim O'Neill and Ajay Royan. Unlike Clarium Capital, Mithril Capital, a fund with $402 million at the time of launch, targets companies that are beyond the startup stage and ready to scale up. Thiel holds shares in the space-based intelligence company BlackSky through Mithril. It also invests in Helion Energy.

=== 1517 Fund ===
The 1517 Fund was founded in 2015 by Danielle Strachman and Michael Gibson, who were both in the founding team of the Thiel Fellowship. The fund provides cash grants and investments, aiming at extending the support already granted by the Thiel Fellowship. It targets "dropouts, renegade students, and deep tech scientists". Peter Thiel backs the fund. Its portfolio companies include Luminar Technologies, Loom, Inc., Atom Computing and Durin Mining Technologies, among others.

=== America's Frontier Fund ===
Thiel is the co-founder of America's Frontier Fund, together with Eric Schmidt. The New York Times writes that, America's Frontier Fund is an organization committed to bringing manufacturing back to the US, especially that of semiconductors, and the leaders are determined to carry out this mission whether the state helps them or not. InfluenceWatch notes the fund's bipartisan character, with the participation of Ashton B. Carter and H.R. McMaster and the fact that the two founders are left and right-of-center respectively. The chief executive is Gilman Louie. The fund is characterized by Intelligence Online as "China-sceptic". It backs Venus Aerospace, a company that develops hypersonic flight using a rotating detonation rocket engine (since November 2024) and Foundation Alloy.

In December 2024, it got approval to get funding from the Small Business Investment Company Critical Technology Initiative (SBICCT), which is "a joint effort by the U.S. Small Business Administration and the Department of Defense." In July 2025, it reportedly raised US$315 million for its first fund.

=== Rivada Space Networks ===
Around the early 2020s, the Bavarian startup Kleo-Connect successfully developed a highly advanced satellite technology, which is considered much more suitable for governmental and military use than that of Starlink, which was originally conceived for civilian use only. It was feared the technology would fall into the hands of the PLA through its Chinese investors (who invested in the startup since 2018) though. Thus, the German government banned the sale of the company to China, but 144 lawsuits worldwide deterred investors from helping the company expand the constellation. The founders decided to bring in the US's "highest conservative circles" (which led to the formation of Rivada Space Networks, which drew its personnel mainly from Kleo-Connect, in 2022), among which Karl Rove participated as an investor and lobbyist, and former US secretary of state Mike Pompeo joined the board of the mother company in the US, alongside others like Richard Myers, Jeb Bush, James Loy, Lord Guthrie and the Democrat Martin O'Malley. Rivada Networks's chairman Declan Ganley notes in particular the power of Thiel's name (whose investment in the firm remains undisclosed) in negotiation with investors. The United States Department of Defense is also an investor. Newt Gingrich is noted to have lobbied for the firm too. By 2025, the "politically connected company" has already expanded to 33 countries and collected 16 billion dollars in investments, despite having not launched its satellites (deployment is set to begin in 2027 with initial tests set for 2026). Thiel reportedly works to help the company's development, especially regarding its legal battles.

=== SNÖ Ventures ===
Thiel is an investor and strategic partner of the Oslo-based SNÖ Ventures, having joined the firm in 2021, accompanied by a group of international strategic advisors. In 2024, the fund made its first investment in the defense tech sector, an early funding for the Swedish startup Nordic Air Defence, which developed counter-drone missile technology and is staffed with former employees from Palantir and Quantum Systems. Arctic Today sees this as an evidence of Sweden's strong transatlantic bond which is "seeping into defence", which is also shown in Daniel Ek's Prima Materia's investment in Helsing (which is a strategic partner of Palantir), which happened three months before Russia's 2022 invasion of Ukraine.

=== Elevat3 ===
In 2020, Thiel became a strategic partner and anchor investor of Elevat3, which is set up by Christian Angermayer's Apeiron Investment Group to invest in startups in German-speaking countries. The fund focuses on "life sciences, deep tech, fintech (financial technology), property and insurance". The fund has a partnership with the Founder Fund. In 2020, Thiel invested into the Neunkirchen-based startup Neodigital through the fund. The fund also backs other European startups such as the London-based aggregator startup Olsam. In 2022, through Elevat3 and in partnership with the Founders Fund, the Apeiron Group bought shares from the Chinese Fosun International and others to become a shareholder in the Hamburg-based NAGA Group. Thiel also holds shares in Heidelberger Beteiligungsholding (which will be renamed as SQD.AI Strategies AG), the first dedicated German crypto holding treasury, through the firm.

=== Octave companies ===
Thiel is associated with a number of companies named Octave. Octave Japan or Octave Group, a Kantō- and Tokyo-based company controlled by Thiel, was founded in 2014. Together with Rakuten, Noevir Holdings and Alpen, this company established AirAsia Japan as a joint venture in 2014, but the low-cost carrier shut down in 2020 due to the Covid pandemic. Octave Ventures, a Thiel-backed, Nevada-based fund, has supported companies such as Luminar, the fabless semiconductor company Cornami as well as Qolab, a quantum company co-founded by Nobel laureate John M. Martinis. The manager of the fund is Michael S. Kim. It has two branches, Octave Life Sciences and Octave Tech Investment. The Mumbai-based biotech-focused Octave Life Sciences invests in companies such as D&D Pharmatech D&D and its branches such as Neuraly and Valted Seq are associated with neurologist Ted M. Dawson (Valted Seq is also backed by Octave Ventures' affiliate OV Principal Investments). Octave Ventures plays a role in the partnership between Palantir and OKWave as well.

=== Crescendo Equity Partners ===
Seoul-based Crescendo Equity is a private equity firm which focuses on developing SME companies into hidden champions and bringing them to the global scale. According to the official website, "Crescendo was established in 2012 with the sponsorship of Peter Thiel". The fund is co-founded by Peter Thiel, Matt Danzeisen (who serves as a member of its investment committee and representative to selected portfolio companies), Andy Lee (company chairman), Matt Price (CEO) and Slava Zhakov (CTO). The president is Anand Chandrasekaran. General Catalyst is also heavily involved in its financing and organization. The fund invests in Line Next (a unit of the Line Corporation), a joint venture between Softbank and Naver. The Business Korea credits Crescendo Equity Partners with transforming Korea's HPSP, which it invested in since 2017, into a global player in the semiconductor equipment sector. Crescendo also plays an important role in the Korean semiconductor industry through investments and support of other companies like Hanmi Semiconductor, Samyang NCchem. and Movensys (originally known as Soft Servo Group or Soft Motions & Robotics; the name was changed to Movensys in 2021 after Crescendo's investment). In 2026, Crescendo became a major shareholder of Sungho Electronics after selling to them INTIMAX, a firm which provides semiconductor handlers to the "Big Three" memory manufacturers (SK Hynix, Samsung Electronics and Micron). In 2026, both HPSP and Hanmi were reported to prepare to work with Elon Musk on the Terafab project. The firm also invests in companies that make metal equipment, including Seojin System and Model Solution. Since 2019, Crescendo also owns Dong-Ah Geological Engineering, which in 2024 succeeded in manufacturing a tunnel boring machine (TBM) using its own technology.

=== Pronomos Capital ===
Thiel began to explore investing in charter cities on land after his interest in seasteading faded. Thiel is the anchor backer of Pronomos Capital, a firm "set up like a venture capital fund" that seeks to establish experimental, semi-autonomous cities in vacant lands, with acceptance from the countries involved. The founder of the firm is Patri Friedman. Projects backed by the firm include Próspera in Honduras. The Próspera project attracted companies like Oklo Inc. (nuclear startup backed by Thiel's Mithril and Sam Altman) and biotech startups, but led to legal struggles when the new Honduran government changed the laws in 2022.

=== Praxis and controversies in Denmark ===
Praxis is a company that seeks to establish a new city-state and has explored Greenland as a possible location. In 2025, when the Danish government was integrating Palantir into the country's military, police and intelligence services, a major argument put forth by opponents was that the Praxis project (backed by Thiel through Pronomos) was a threat to Greenland. Other arguments were concerned with Thiel's politics in the US and Palantir's association with American and other European intelligence services, as well as the security risk that might arise from handing citizens' data to Palantir. The Danish National Police answered with a reference to a 2021 response to the Folketing, but otherwise, the Police, the Danish Security and Intelligence Service and Minister of Justice Peter Hummelgaard refused to comment on the matter.

=== Thiel Bio ===
The firm was founded in 2023 by Jason Camm (Chief Medical Officer of Thiel Capital). The regulatory filing does not disclose the name of the single investor who provides US$100 million or Thiel's involvement beyond the use of his name. The fund has invested in Ataraxis AI and EnClear Therapies together with the Founders Fund. Reports about investments in October 2025 (infection therapeutics company Peptilogics and cancer treatment startup HistoSonics) confirm that the firm is Thiel's. Hannes Holste from Thiel Capital is a partner.

=== Rivendell companies ===
Thiel owns multiple entities named Rivendell, such as Rivendell One LLC, Rivendell 7 and Rivendell 25. Rivendell 7 and Rivendell 25 are personal investment vehicles, which are also used to hold Palantir shares. ProPublica reports that Thiel's $1,700 PayPal investment and later investments in Palantir and Facebook through a Roth IRA had grown tax-free to over $5 billion by 2019. The Roth was held in Rivendell Trust since 2018. Thiel bankrolled the satellite imaging startup HySpecIQ, known for serving government agencies but struggling financially, through Rivendell Fund. Rivendell entities are known to participate in his German or Korean investments.

=== Other business enterprises ===
According to a 2020 article from Bloomberg, Thiel was at the time an investor in funds managed by 8VC and in the bank Disruptive Technology Advisers. A 2017 Globe and Mail article names Thiel as a limited partner at Social Capital. He also sponsored Sam Altman's first venture fund, Hydrazine Capital as well as J.D.Vance's Narya Capital. He also backs Doepfner Capital, the venture fund of Moritz Döpfner, the son of Mathias Döpfner. He funded 90% of Zeev Ventures's first fund and has backed it ever since. The Founders Fund was also a backer of the second fund of the Indonesia-focused Intudo. The involvement helped Intudo to validate its mission. Founders Fund is also among the backers of the Israel-based Mensch Capital. Thiel also backs the Singaporean venture investment firm Syfe Group through Valar. The Founders Fund also invested in the Seattle-based private equity fund Privateer Holdings in 2015, thereby becoming the first institutional investor in the cannabis industry.

His first investment in a hedge fund managed by an outside manager was made in 2011: the firm was Grandmaster Capital Management, founded by Patrick Wolff, former Clarium and Thiel Macro executive. Also in 2011, he backed the second fund of Joshua Kushner's Thrive Capital.

Thiel initiated the idea of the company RoboteX, which was built in 2007 and headed by his Palantir co-founder Nathan Gettings. It provided robots for police, firefighters and SWAT teams. Thiel and Alex Karp also served on the board as directors and investors.

In March 2015, Thiel joined Y Combinator as one of 10 part-time partners. In November 2017, it was reported that Y Combinator had severed its ties with Thiel.

In 2019, Thiel, together with Mark Cuban and Marc Andreessen, backed the San Francisco-based crypto investment fund 1Confirmation.

He served on AbCellera's board from 2020 to 2024, when he resigned for personal reasons. Both sides stated that there was no disagreement, with Thiel saying that he was proud to have helped the company and AbCellera's founder Carl Hansen thanking him for his mentorship. He also retains his stake in the company, as of November 2024.

Thiel gives backing to Vivek Ramaswamy's financial firm Strive Asset Management, also described as an activist fund. The firm aims to free "corporate America" of what they deem to be "stakeholder capitalism" ESG mandates created by the three companies BlackRock, Vanguard and State Street and accuses them of causing the energy crisis. The firm does not deny climate science.

In 2021, Thiel backed the first fund of A-Star Partners, founded by Kevin Hartz, former partner at Founders Fund. In 2022, he backed B2B-focused Wischoff Ventures founded by solo GP Nichole Wischoff.

Thiel is also a major backer of the venture debt firm Tacora, founded by Keri Findley. Its inaugural fund in 2022 raised US$350 million in total, including US$250 million from Thiel. Bloomberg comments that, "It's an unusually large investment for Thiel, the size of which hasn't been previously reported." Findley was originally an associate of Danzeisen, whom she met because she and Thiel Capital both invested in SoFi. Thiel agreed to fund her after she discussed the idea with him at a casual dinner.

Alexandra Ulmer and Joseph Tanfani from Reuters remark that Thiel was an instrumental force behind the creation of 1789 Capital, which was co-founded in 2022 by Omeed Malik and Chris Buskirk, a confidant of Thiel's. Blake Masters is also a board member. The fund is intended to create a "parallel economy", a network that combines "businesses, media outlets and political organizations" associated with the America First movement. In 2024, it recruited Donald Trump Jr. as a partner.

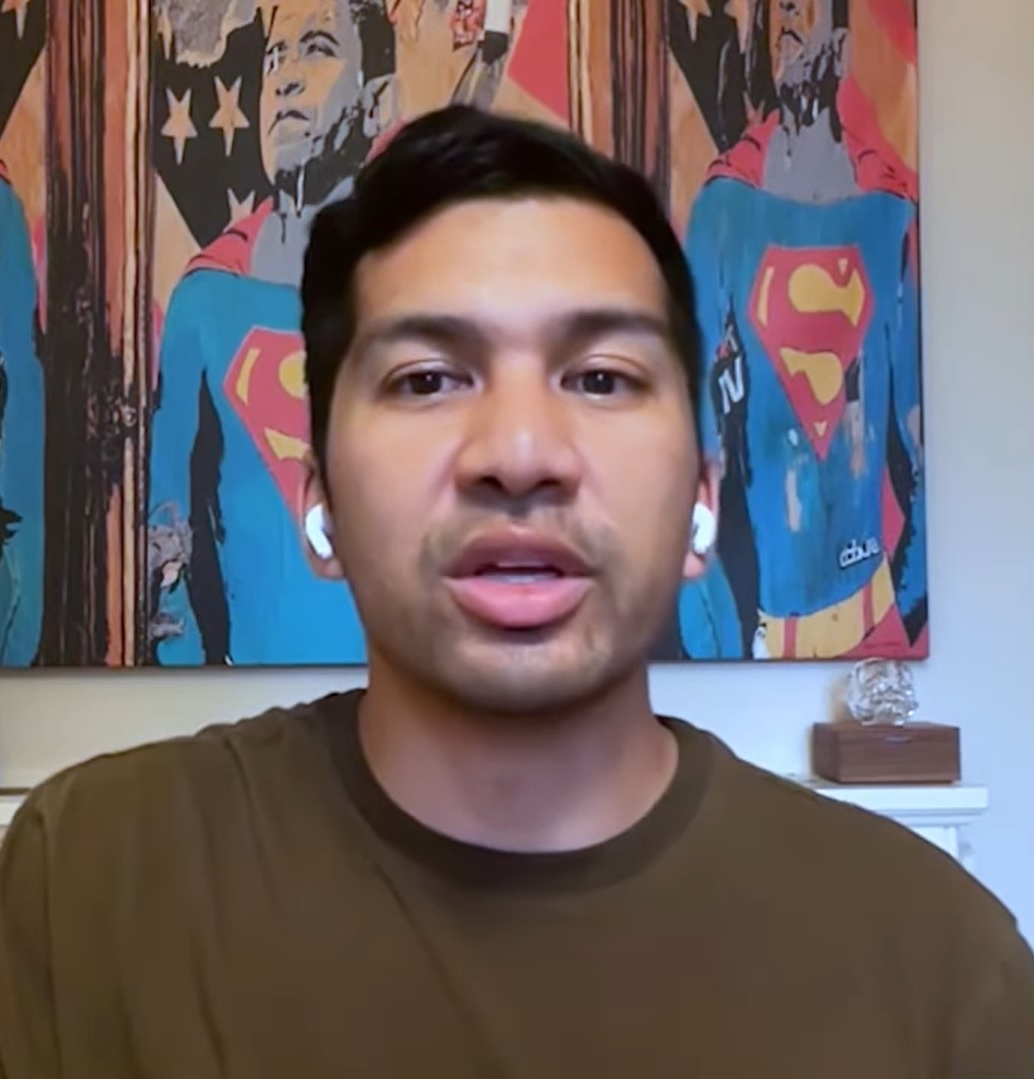
Aron D'Souza in 2025

In 2024, Thiel became the lead funder of the Enhanced Games, a multi-sport event that will allow athletes to use performance-enhancing substances without being subject to drug tests. The founder is the Australian lawyer Aron D'Souza, who came to know and become Thiel's confidant in the process of leading the Gawker case for him. Angermayer, who was introduced to D'Souza by Thiel, also invested, even though, as per Wired, Thiel and Angermayer were not normally interested in sports. The startup agrees to cover legal expenses for any clean athletes who participate in the event and are banned from mainstream competitions as a result.

He personally invests in Quora (leading its Series B), Reddit, and nuclear startup Seaborg Technologies (now Saltfoss Energy).

In 2026, Thiel invested in Objection.ai, a startup that evaluates claims made by journalists.

== Gawker lawsuit ==
In May 2016, Thiel confirmed in an interview with The New York Times that he had paid $10 million in legal expenses to finance several lawsuits brought by others, including a lawsuit by Terry Bollea (Hulk Hogan) against Gawker Media for invasion of privacy, intentional infliction of emotional distress, and infringement of personality rights after Gawker made sections of a sex tape involving Bollea public. The jury awarded Bollea $140 million, and Gawker announced it was permanently closing due to the lawsuit in August 2016. Thiel referred to his financial support of Bollea's case as one of the "greater philanthropic things that I've done."

Thiel said he was motivated to sue Gawker after they published a 2007 article publicly outing him, headlined "Peter Thiel is totally gay, people." Thiel stated that Gawker articles about others, including his friends, had "ruined people's lives for no reason," and said, "It's less about revenge and more about specific deterrence." In response to criticism that his funding of lawsuits against Gawker could restrict the freedom of the press, Thiel cited his donations to the Committee to Protect Journalists and stated, "I refuse to believe that journalism means massive privacy violations. I think much more highly of journalists than that. It's precisely because I respect journalists that I do not believe they are endangered by fighting back against Gawker." Owen Thomas, the author of the Gawker article, stated that he did not think it was an outing in the conventional sense, as Thiel had been open about his homosexuality, but the "strangely conservative" Silicon Valley had refused to talk about it. Thiel said that the problem was less about the outing itself, but the troubles it caused with regard to his business in Saudi Arabia and his parents.

On 15 August 2016, Thiel published an opinion piece in The New York Times in which he argued that his defense of online privacy went beyond Gawker. He highlighted his support for the Intimate Privacy Protection Act and said that athletes and business executives have the right to stay in the closet as long as they want to.

In an open letter to Thiel after losing the case, Gawker's Nick Denton accused Thiel of making them "stripped naked", together with the warning "in the next phase, you too will be subject to a dose of transparency. However philanthropic your intention, and careful the planning, the details of your involvement will be gruesome." Later though, in 2025, Denton said that Thiel was right and did him a favor in forcing the sale of Gawker Media.

== Views and political activities ==
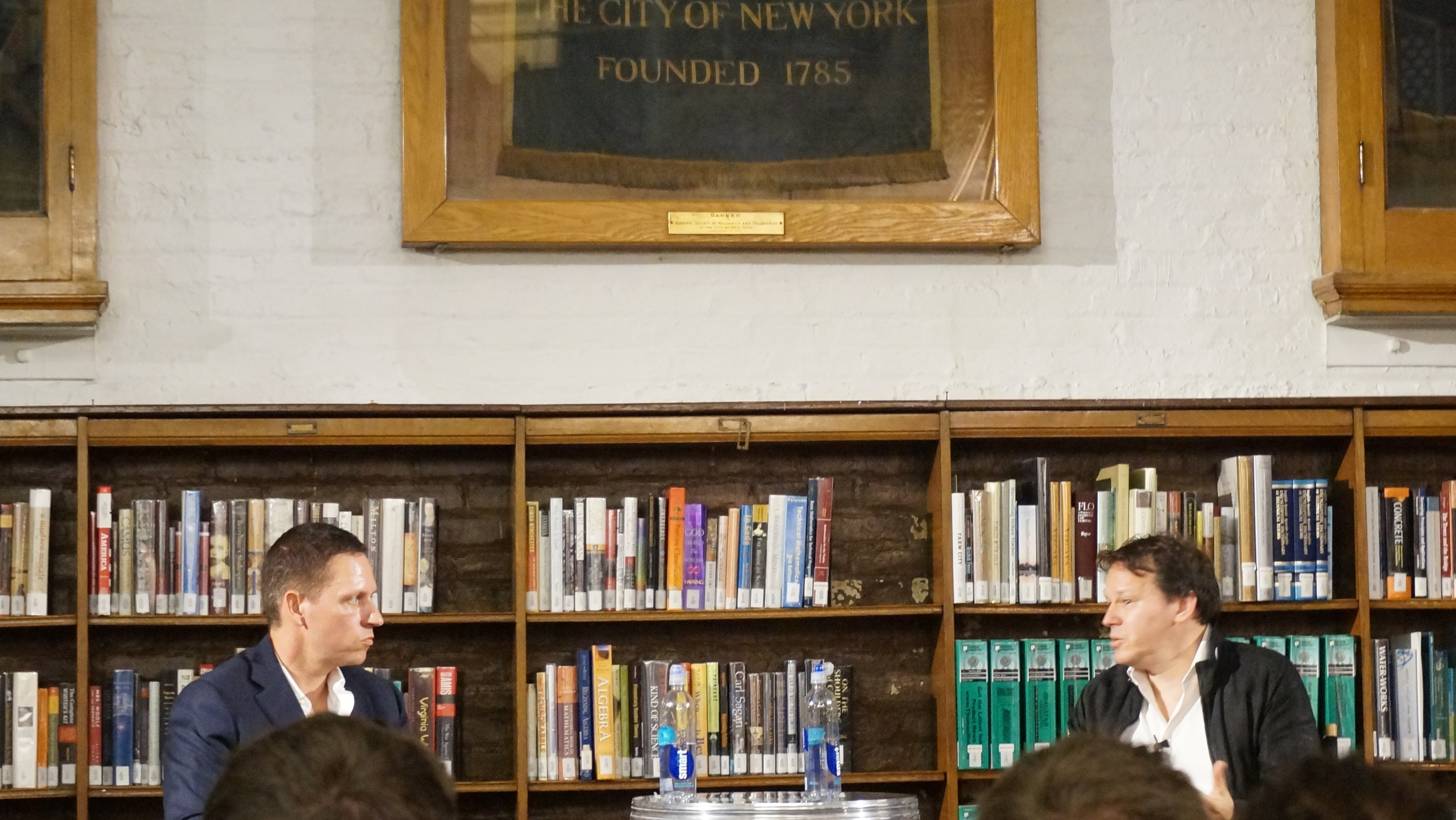
Peter Thiel and David Graeber discussing technology, democracy and the future in 2014

=== Philosophical views ===
Thiel is described by different authors and media sources in different ways. He identifies as a libertarian. He has been called an Ayn Rand libertarian, plutocratic reactionary, militarist techno-libertarian, and libertarian authoritarian. His attitude towards democracy has been described as "skeptical", partly antidemocratic, or post-democratic. French economist Yann Algan links Peter Thiel and Elon Musk to the concept of "liquid democracy" and the rise of libertarian AI governance, which Algan defines as "a radically decentralized, algorithm-driven democracy", which "prioritizes efficiency and individual freedom over democratic safeguards". Thiel's biographer Max Chafkin notes that his thinking is a mix of libertarianism and authoritarianism, but describes what Thiel truly believes and wants as a mystery.

Thiel describes himself as a political atheist. He opines that trying to radically alter the current U.S. government is unrealistic. He also suggests that Curtis Yarvin methods will lead to Xi's China or Putin's Russia. He does not deny the value of statesmanship though, (Note: Peter Thiel: "But also there cannot be a decision to avoid all decisions and to retreat into studying the Bible in anticipation of the Second Coming, for then one will have ceased to be a statesman or stateswoman.") but opines that "people should spend less time trying to change the system than simply creating things outside it".

Journalist Murad Ahmed from Financial Times calls Thiel "philosopher king at the very top of Silicon Valley" (with France 24 using a similar description). German philosopher Peter Sloterdijk also remarks: "Peter Thiel can be seen as more of a philosopher king. He acts very coolly and strategically – a dazzling figure, far outside our left-liberal perception patterns", while Ross Douthat from The New York Times describes him as "most influential right-wing intellectual of the last 20 years". Commenting on Douthat's description, Luke Munn of the University of Queensland notes that, "Thiel's influence on politics is at once financial, technical and ideological [...] his potent cocktail of networks, money, strategy and support exerts a rightward force on the political landscape."

In 2025, the author Ijoma Mangold wrote an article for Die Zeit, describing Thiel's theories as obscure and incoherent at first glance, argues he often displays an accurate "intuition", while noting that both the man and his ideas "simultaneously fascinates, repels, and outrages." Subsequently, the author René Martens, writing for Mitteldeutscher Rundfunk, criticized Mangold and Die Zeit for masking their admiration with pseudo-criticism and called Thiel a disciple of Nazi-supporter Carl Schmitt.

In 2009, The Guardian stated that Thiel was a member of the web-based organization TheVanguard, a neoconservative pressure group founded in opposition to the progressive organization MoveOn. The outlet said Thiel believes the Enlightenment led humanity from nature's rule to a world where nature has been conquered, and also noted Thiel's philosophy disregarded art, beauty, love, pleasure, and truth.

The Guardian linked Thiel's investment in projects like the Singularity Institute to his belief in life-extension technologies as an escape from humanity's "nasty, brutish, and short" life. It criticized him for seeking to replace the natural world with a virtual one.

Vadym Kovalenko notes that during the 90s and 2000s, Silicon Valley followed the spirit of Steve Jobs, who saw technology as art. But later this has translated into Thielism, which emphasizes "truth, the ideal, ontology" and matters like flying to Mars, curing aging and creating a new world over the superficiality. Kovalenko sees Thiel as a humanitarian Über-artist.

On the question of exotericism versus esotericism, Paul Leslie writes that in "The Straussian moment", Thiel tries to "weave together Schmitt's political theology—with its emphasis on the friend/enemy distinction—and Strauss's advocacy for esoteric wisdom and hidden hierarchies." In the article "Exotericism and the Untroubled Race for the Future", Thiel discerns between ancient esotericism, in which "thrice-great Hermes revealed his magical recipes only to a few" and "modern esotericism of grantwriting". He remarks, though, that exotericism takes time, and Goethe was "perhaps [...] the last human being to command the sum total of human knowledge."

Writing for the Quarterly Journal of Speech in 2024, James Rushing Daniel wrote that:

(...) "a rhetor ambitiously capitalizing on the material crises and political disillusionment of the day, defending a "cultural revolution" to put an end not just to the progressivism of the long 1990s but the values of collectivism and social justice and the remnants of social democracy and the Keynesian welfare state, replacing them with Randian individualism and the absolute dominance of the capitalist project."

According to Daniel, Thiel has financially supported the intellectual wing of "the reactionary, traditionalist turn of conservative politics" termed by some as "the New Right". The Nation notes that he advocates "for a dramatic, right-wing political turn to address technological stagnation".

Nick Land attributed Thiel's 2009 essay "The Education of a Libertarian" and statement that "I no longer believe that freedom and democracy are compatible" as a watershed moment in the development of the Dark Enlightenment movement. Patrick Zarrelli argues the quote is misread as anti-democratic, when Thiel's real concern is that mass democracy could erode the freedoms essential for innovation, but notes that Thiel underestimates the limits of technocracy like lack of democratic accountability. Zarelli remarks that Thiel has partially realized his philosophy: "By aligning technology with national priorities like defense modernization, pandemic response, and intelligence fusion, he has built parallel governance inside the state itself.", and notes that critics call Thiel a "shadow oligarch". Zarelli opines that a solution might be a hybrid form between technocracy and democracy.

Italian professor Giuliano da Empoli opines that Thiel represents the alliance between the post-modern Silicon Valley and the archaic Trump, that threatens democracy. The author recognizes that the Silicon Valley actors are gifted and have the means to govern more efficiently than democratic institutions in some respects. He argues that humanity must not respond to post-modern tech leaders like the Aztecs did to the conquistadors, but must instead make deliberate choices about which areas should still prioritize democratic decision-making, even at the risk of less efficient outcomes. In his book L'Empire de l'ombre, Da Empoli echoes the sentiment of Thiel's quote, "Darker questions still emerge in these dusky final weeks of our interregnum," interpreting the "apocalypse" not as the end of the world, but as a sudden unveiling of forces that had long been taking shape beneath the surface.

Blue Labour founder Maurice Glasman (who first met Thiel at Oxford, where Glasman rebuked Thiel's description of the British Empire as the Antichrist) denounces Thiel's view on democracy but defends leftist politicians' interaction with Thiel, saying that parties which have no place in the AI conversation will be out of the game very fast. Danish politician Christopher Arzrouni dismisses Dagbladet Information's description of Thiel as a Prussian warhorse (preussisk kamphest) or a bigot tech prince who would bring the end of democracy or the world, calling him "a smart European who finds better opportunities in the U.S.", and criticizes European intellectuals' fear of new technology.

Jacob Silverman noted that Thiel's actual political work drifted away from libertarianism, but it remained his intellectual guiding star. Jack Nicastro of Reason notes that Thiel's solution for "the dangers of government overreach and a one-world state" is "surprisingly libertarian".

George A. Dunn argues that Thiel is the pathbreaker in connecting the thoughts of Girard and Strauss to debates on the origins of modernity. Dunn notes that Thiel emphasizes Girard and Strauss's shared insight into human civilization's violent origins. According to Dunn, Thiel believes that Strauss's retreat to premodern exoteric writing, which "revealed dangerous truths to select audience while shielding them from the wilder public", made Strauss misjudge the modern virtue of intellectual probity, and endorses Girard's conclusion "that salvation is no longer to be found in philosophical reticence".

=== Political views ===
Thiel is a self-described conservative libertarian. Since the late 2010s, he has espoused support for national conservatism, and criticized economically liberal attitudes towards free trade and Big Tech. Thiel advocates that companies should avoid competition and attention, and try to develop into monopolies by creating something new, dominating a niche market before expanding into slightly broader markets. He notes that years or even decades of profits can come from such specific markets.

In The Straussian Moment, Thiel notes that, "Since 1920, the vast increase in welfare beneficiaries and the extension of the franchise to women – two constituencies that are notoriously tough for libertarians – have rendered the notion of 'capitalist democracy' into an oxymoron." After the statement caused controversies, he replied that, he had made a "commonplace statistical observation about voting patterns that is often called the gender gap", and that women's right to vote was not under siege nor would taking it away solve any problem, but people should focus on projects outside of voting and politics. Adam Rogers contends that this essay has prefigured the Department of Government Efficiency project.

In a 2015 conversation with Tyler Cowen, Thiel claimed that innovative breakthroughs were happening in computing/IT and not the physical world. He lamented the lack of progress in space travel, high-speed transit, and medical devices. As a cause for the discrepancy, he said: "I would say that we lived in a world in which bits were unregulated and atoms were regulated."

In 2021, Thiel wrote an article for Die Welt, claiming that the extreme political experiments of fascism and communism in the 20th century had led Germany to fear extremism in both politics and technology. However, as "the decisive arena for the future of the West", being the land of poets and thinkers would not be enough for Germany in the new era. He criticized "green quietism" and opined that new ideas could be dangerous but would be the source of growth.

In the 2025 Douthat interview, Thiel stated that, "Reagan was consumer capitalism, which is oxymoronic. You don't save money as a capitalist; you borrow money. And Obama was low-tax socialism – just as oxymoronic as the consumerist capitalism of Reagan."

Thiel prefers a small state, for which he cites Singapore as a good example, which is between the model of France (big state) and Somalia (no state). He criticizes California's wokeism and Saudi Arabia's wahhabism.

Klaus Schwab, the WEF's founder and originator of the theory of stakeholder capitalism, calls what Thiel represents "tech-elite capitalism". According to Schwab, contrary to stakeholder capitalism, tech-elite capitalism emphasizes speed and innovation, creating a "quiet revolution" with explosive innovation that challenges democratic legal framework. Noting the reality that capital follows innovation and not vice versa, thus giving power to those who control innovation, Schwab opines that the tech elites need to be recognized but also given guidance and integration into the democratic order. Vatican advisor Paolo Benanti writes that Thiel's career is "a challenge to the very foundations of civil coexistence", noting that innovation only becomes development if it serves everyone, and democracy is eroded when "one player controls the entire stack," from hardware to software. Benanti calls for the student and academic community to develop alternatives to parts of this stack. Italian scholar Andrea Venanzoni notes that Thiel is organically linked to almost all current tech companies, even those whose vision contrasts against his, like Anthropic. Venanzoni writes that technological innovation transforms geopolitical and diplomatic structures, pointing to Thiel's work in Argentina, which represents "parallel diplomacy" on behalf of the US but also accelerates innovation in the host country. Venanzoni urges the Italian government to approach Thiel without bias, in order to build up Italian innovation policy, without bowing to Washington.

==== On international relations ====
The Founders Fund and Khosla Ventures are backers of the Hill & Valley Forum, a group that is described by the Wall Street Journal as an anti-China alliance between Silicon Valley and Capitol Hill. In an article named Silicon soldiers of fortune, the China Daily, the channel of the Central Propaganda Department of the Chinese Communist Party, identifies Thiel, Palmer Luckey and Jacob Helberg as tech hawks who are increasingly shaping US policy towards China. The Xinhua News Agency, China's official state news agency, states that Palantir and its leaders like Thiel and Vice President Wendy R. Anderson as well as other companies like Anduril and Saronic Technologies, as representatives of "the new military industrial complex", are an unpredictable danger to the US and the international community. The tech-focused outlet 36Kr though praises his long-term vision and methods in breaking down the traditional barriers in the US military-industrial complex and government sector, and his contribution to leading startups like Palantir, Anduril and SpaceX. The Brazilian newspaper Brasil de Fato (described by The New York Times as part of a "global web of Chinese propaganda") portrays Thiel as "the brightest anti-communist in the US", part of the anti-China brigade, "the leader of the tech-based section of the military-industrial complex" as well as "the most geo-politically strategic tech billionaire" and "the most dangerous non-state figure in the world today". According to Brasil de Fato, among all the capitalists, Thiel has the strongest grip on the National Security Council.

In 2019, Thiel called Google "seemingly treasonous" and urged a government investigation, citing Google's work with China and asking whether DeepMind or Google's senior management had been "infiltrated" by foreign intelligence agencies.

In 2025, Thiel called for a drastic reset in economic relations with China, stressing that economic relations should be viewed from a geopolitical standpoint as well. In a discussion with Peter Robinson, he opined that the US should not let itself be stuck between two extreme views about China (that China itself encourages to promote an attitude of political inaction towards them): "It's China is super weak, and China is super strong. And I've been in meetings in China where in some sense you got both messages within 20 minutes of one another, and it's like logically inconsistent, but psychologically it doubles up."

In 2024, Palantir became a strategic partner of Israel in military technology on an occasion both Thiel and Karp visited the country. In a 2024 interview with Bari Weiss, Thiel advocated cooperation with Israel to deter Iran from getting nuclear weapons:

One of the lessons I take of the mid-20th century was every time a country got a nuclear weapon, we got a regional war. The Soviet Union gets the bomb in 1949. The Korean War starts in 1950 because when the Soviet Union backs North Korea, we can't bomb Russia. Then they can back North Korea with impunity, and we get a massive, massive regional war. That's, in a way, the price for being asleep at the switch and letting the Soviets get the bomb. 1964, Communist China gets the bomb. Vietnam War explodes in 1965. And again, China can back North Vietnam with impunity. We can't reciprocate. And the way I understand why would an Iranian nuclear bomb be a catastrophe? Because the degree to which Iran can support this plethora of bad actors, the Houthis, the Hamas people, and Hezbollah, and on and on throughout the Middle East, you could not retaliate against Iran [...] And so we don't have to go to the crazy theocracy that said they'd use the bomb and would use it.

Regarding the Russia-Ukraine war, he opined that "the relentless NATO expansion might not have been a good idea", but the US could not simply retreat from Ukraine, because it would become a rout.

In 2025, writing for the Singapore-based think tank ThinkChina, Artyom Lukin, a leading Russian expert on Asia-Pacific geopolitical issues, wrote that Thiel, whom Lukin described as "the éminence grise of Trump's own deep state" and "the most anti-China figure in the US top elite", together with his allies, were pushing the American geostrategy towards focusing on China (a country Thiel saw as "a half fascist, half communist gerontocracy" with "a socialism of a nationalistic sort, and [...] extremely racist.") as the paramount threat. Lukin noted that Thiel had little sympathy for Russia, but viewed it as a lesser threat and did not want to push Moscow towards Beijing's arms.

According to The Intercept, Thiel is the source of the warrior culture in Silicon Valley, one focused on an arms race with China, although the anti-China sentiment is found on both sides of the political spectrum. Alex Karp notes that Palantir has a warrior culture, which values excellence over money.

In 2026, Thiel said that by focusing on restricting just one side of the AI race between the US and China, Pope Leo XIV inadvertently acts as a Chinese agent. Swiss author Giuseppe Gracia writes that Thiel "expects every American and European to side with the West in the race against China. Anything less would be treason", commenting that in the current atmosphere, this logic of objective necessity is limiting critical thinking.

=== Religious views ===
Thiel is a self-described Christian and a promoter of René Girard's Christian anthropology. Girard, a Catholic, explained the role of sacrifice and the scapegoat mechanism in resolving social conflict, which appealed to Thiel as it offered a basis for his Christian faith without the fundamentalism of his parents. Thiel grew up in an evangelical household but, as of 2011, described his religious beliefs as "somewhat heterodox", stating: "I believe Christianity is true but I don't sort of feel a compelling need to convince other people of that." According to Thiel, "Christianity for me is the anti-identity. Your identity is in Christ [...] and it's in that context we can figure out things about the world and truth [...] [Truth] is not a social construct." Thiel has participated in Veritas Forum events with the theologian N. T. Wright discussing religion, politics, and technology.

Thiel believes that "wokeism" or "wokeness" is a type of secular religion, which he sees as both "anti-Christian" and "ultra-Christian", stating: "There’s no forgiveness, and you still have original sin, and you have all these bad things that happen in the past, the past is terrible, and you can never overcome it. But there surely is a religious interpretation of this. What happened is, let’s say, the church lost a certain amount of authority, but people didn’t become rationalist, atheist people; they went into this sort of Woke religion, which I would interpret as a certain, extreme form of Christianity."

Thiel claims that this strand of thinking, which attacks Christians for not doing enough for victims or the poor, is a continuation of communism and the social gospel, which also inherit some Christian characteristics while being anti-Christian at the same time.

Mikhail Minakov writes that "Thiel's conception of will integrates Christian eschatology, Girardian mimetic theory, and Straussian elitism to critique the impotence of liberal democracy while proposing the efficiency of a techno-feudal alternative." Elke Schwarz, a professor of political theory, notes that Peter Thiel and Marc Andreessen are the foremost proponents of techno-eschatology, which demonstrates the sacralizing of AI and uses spiritualism to bolster the logic of venture capitalism. Thiel opines that, "Crypto is decentralizing, AI is centralizing. Or, if you want to frame it more ideologically, crypto is libertarian and AI is communist."

==== Focus on Antichrist ====
In talks Thiel has discussed the Antichrist, Armageddon and the Apocalypse, including a September 2025 series of off-the-record private lectures organized by the Acts 17 Collective in San Francisc. The talk drew a group of protesters. Thiel claimed that people are worried about potential apocalyptic threats such as environment degradation, nuclear wars or bioweapons. He recognizes these as credible threats, but sees a one-world government as closer to the Antichrist. He sees humanity as facing the double threats of the Antichrist and the Armageddon, which is the collapse of civilization through global warfare. He sees salvation in the figure of the Katechon, a mysterious force that restrains the Antichrist. He has referred to individuals, organizations, communism and anti-tech regulations as precursors of the Antichrist. For example, he referred to environmental activist Greta Thunberg and AI safety advocate Eliezer Yudkowsky as "legionnaires of the Antichrist".

=== Political activism ===
Thiel is a member of the Steering Committee of the Bilderberg Group, a gathering of intellectual figures, political leaders, and business executives, characterized as focused on defense and espionage, as well as Atlanticist and Europhile. Thiel's outsized influence at the gathering has been noted. Thiel, together with Auren Hoffman, is also the founder of Dialog, which is often compared to Bilderberg, but focuses more on tech. It does not share the lists of participants but is known to have invited American tech and political leaders, as well as intellectual heavyweights, on both sides of the political spectrum, as well as representatives from Europe and Middle East. Past topics included "AI's energy demands, the future of health care, and political realignments" and "caring for aging parents, love, mental health and the afterlife." Palantir is partner of the World Economic Forum, but Thiel has not gone to the meeting since 2013, because he considers it a place without individuals – there are only representatives of companies, governments and NGOs. He opines that some types of global governance might work, but it is necessary to have dissenting views.

The Thiel Foundation is a supporter of the Committee to Protect Journalists (CPJ), which promotes the right of journalists to report the news freely without fear of reprisal. Beginning in 2008, Thiel has donated over $1 million to the CPJ. He is also a supporter of the Human Rights Foundation, which organizes the Oslo Freedom Forum. In 2011 he was a featured speaker at the Oslo Freedom Forum, and the Thiel Foundation was one of the event's main sponsors. He also backs the Alliance of Democracies Foundation founded by Anders Fogh Rasmussen.

Thiel has supported mostly conservative gay rights causes such as the American Foundation for Equal Rights and GOProud. He invited conservative columnist and friend Ann Coulter to Homocon 2010 as a guest speaker. Coulter later dedicated her 2011 book, Demonic: How the Liberal Mob Is Endangering America, to Thiel. In 2012, Thiel donated $10,000 to Minnesotans United for All Families, in order to fight Minnesota Amendment 1 that proposed to ban marriage between same-sex couples there.

In 2009, it was reported that Thiel helped fund James O'Keefe's "Taxpayers Clearing House" video—a satirical look at the Wall Street bailout. O'Keefe went on to produce the ACORN undercover sting videos; Thiel denied involvement in the ACORN sting.

In July 2012, Thiel made a $1 million donation to the Club for Growth, a fiscally conservative 501(c)(4) organization, becoming the group's largest contributor. He is a major backer of the conservative Rockbridge Network, which is now an international network with Asian branches.

In 2023, Business Insider reported that Thiel became an FBI informant in 2021. Business Insider also noted the fact that politicians sponsored by Thiel, including Vance and Masters, had repeatedly attacked the FBI and its leadership in public. According to former FBI agent Jonathan Buma, Peter Thiel, Elon Musk and David Sacks have been targets of Russian intelligence. Buma notes that Thiel cooperated with the FBI to identify the foreign espionage network.

He visited president of Argentina and fellow libertarian Javier Milei three times in 2024. The Noticias de América Latina y el Caribe (NODAL) remarks that the cooperation between Thiel and Milei marks the political alignment between Argentina and Washington and Silicon Valley, also through organizations like Endeavor. According to NODAL, the introduction of Argentina into Thiel's network is erasing traditional politics while promoting a tech-based order which increases efficiency but also puts sovereignty at stake.

Matt Stoller, research director of American Economic Liberties Project, remarks that Thiel is a "really smart nihilist", and notes that his focus is entirely on power. Max Chafkin writes that this is a likely explanation for Thiel's activities.

In 2017, Thiel reportedly refused the offer to become chairman of the president's intelligence advisory board, despite Trump's urging. In the same year, there were reports that he considered becoming U.S. Ambassador to Germany or a bid for governorship of California. At the time, he said that he was not interested in a full-time job in politics. In 2024, he said that he had gotten used to tech and a full-time job as a politician would lead to depression.

In December 2025, Thiel donated $3 million to the lobbying group California Business Roundtable to oppose a proposed 5% wealth tax on billionaires in California.

Some authors opine that he often combines economic and political activities. Intelligence Online notes that since the 2010s, he has gradually cornered the private satellite imagery market through multiple investments by his different funds (Y Combinator, Founders Fund, Mithril), then sold this essential service to governments in the U.S. and other countries as part of a global strategy. Professor Adrian Daub says Thiel's investments are never merely commercial, and when he invests in Europe's arms industry, he aims for the ecosystem. In Israel's case, Globes notes that the matter lies with the lack of capital and interest from Israel's side: Founders Fund and other American funds play an important role in financing Israel's prominent defense startups, while few Israeli investors invest in them except some small, new funds, and defense tech receives just 0.5% of all startup capital in Israel (The leaders of these Israeli companies, like Kela and Covenant, also come from the Thiel ecosystem). Calcalist writes that "the massive American funds want the entire stake." Philosopher Norman Ajari claims that, as Thiel sees AI as representing centralization and the possibility of global economic control, while crypto will favor an individualized and decentralized world, he is "not investing in artificial intelligence to follow its inherent logic—namely, massive centralization and unrestricted access to data—but rather to subordinate it to his libertarian and authoritarian political ambitions".

=== Support for political candidates ===
Thiel is a member of the Republican Party. He contributes to both Libertarian and Republican candidates and causes. In December 2007, Thiel endorsed Ron Paul for President in the 2008 United States presidential election. After Paul failed to secure the Republican nomination, Thiel contributed to the John McCain campaign.

In 2010, Thiel supported Republican Meg Whitman in her unsuccessful bid for the governorship of California. He contributed the maximum allowable $25,900 to the Whitman campaign.

In 2012, Thiel, along with Nosek and Scott Banister, put their support behind the Endorse Liberty Super PAC. Collectively they gave $3.9 million to Endorse Liberty, whose purpose was to promote Ron Paul. After Paul again failed to secure the nomination in the 2012 United States presidential election, Thiel contributed to the Mitt Romney/Paul Ryan presidential ticket of 2012.

Thiel initially supported Carly Fiorina's campaign during the 2016 GOP presidential primary elections. After Fiorina dropped out, Thiel supported Donald Trump and became one of the California delegates for Trump's nomination. He was a headline speaker during the 2016 Republican National Convention, during which he announced that he was proud to be gay, Republican, and American, for which the assembled Republicans cheered. On 15 October 2016, Thiel announced a $1.25 million donation in support of Donald Trump's 2016 presidential campaign.

Thiel stated to The New York Times: "I didn't give him any money for a long time because I didn't think it mattered, and then the campaign asked me to." After Trump's victory, Thiel was named to the executive committee of the president-elect's transition team.

In 2017, Gavin Newsom (then lieutenant governor of California), whose campaign and marijuana legalization effort Thiel had supported, noted that Thiel cared deeply about criminal justice reform and had done a lot of behind-the-scene good work on marriage equality, which he was also passionate about. Newsom remarked, though, that "None of us are jumping up and down that he's aligned himself with President Donald Trump."

By February 2022, Thiel was one of the largest donors to Republican candidates in the 2022 election campaign. By November 2022 he had spent $32 million. He supported 16 senatorial and congressional candidates. Two of said senatorial candidates (Blake Masters (who lost his race) and later U.S. Vice President JD Vance) were also tech investors who had previously worked for Thiel.

In 2023, Barton Gellman of The Atlantic wrote in an article interviewing Thiel that Thiel "has lost interest in democracy" and that "he wouldn't be giving money to any politician, including Donald Trump, in the next presidential campaign". According to Reuters this occurred after he disagreed with the Republican party's focus on cultural issues. In the same Atlantic interview, he stated that the first Trump administration failed even his initial low expectations. In 2024, he described Trump as a clown whom Reid Hoffman's lawsuit turned into a martyr. In 2025, when interviewed by Ross Douthat, Thiel indicated that Trump and the populists were a disruptive factor that would prepare the stage for the process of true rebuilding (in 2023, he also opined that Trump's election would "slash regulations, crush the administrative state – before the country could rebuild"). He stressed that the support of large parts of the Silicon Valley for Trump was not pro-Trump in nature. He stated that disruption did not equal progress, and even his thought of trying to having a conversation with Trump about it (in Trump's first term) later proved "a preposterous fantasy". But he was satisfied about the fact that in the second term, deregulation was happening, for example regarding nuclear energy.

Thiel has his own political-action committee, Free Forever, which is committed to supporting political candidates who support stricter border control, restrictive immigration policy, funds for veterans, and anti-interventionist foreign policy, among other things. According to OpenSecrets, the PAC was active only during the 2020 election cycle and then only in support of Kansas attorney general Kris Kobach's failed U.S. Senate bid. The campaign by Kobach, who lost in the Republican primary, had received almost all of its contributions from Thiel himself.

In 2025, Brendan Glavin, director of insights for OpenSecrets, remarked that Thiel's political donations have "an ideological agenda that's not strictly motivated by financial or business concerns [...] His views are libertarian generally, and he wants to elect people who are like minded."

== Philanthropy ==
Thiel carries out most of his philanthropic activities through the Thiel Foundation.

He has advocated for billionaires to withdraw from The Giving Pledge, a commitment to donate at least 50% of one's wealth, promoting instead a form of philanthropy focused on businesses and innovation.

=== Research ===
==== Artificial intelligence ====
In 2006, Thiel provided $100,000 of matching funds to back the Singularity Challenge donation drive of the Singularity Institute for Artificial Intelligence (now known as the Machine Intelligence Research Institute), a nonprofit organization that promotes the development of friendly artificial intelligence. He provided half of the $400,000 matching funds for the 2007 donation drive, and as of 2013 the Thiel Foundation had donated over $1 million to the institute. Additionally, he has spoken at multiple Singularity Summits. At the 2009 Singularity Summit, he said his greatest concern is the technological singularity not arriving soon enough.

In December 2015, OpenAI, a nonprofit company aimed at the safe development of artificial general intelligence, announced that Thiel was one of its financial backers.

==== Life extension ====
In September 2006, Thiel announced that he would donate $3.5 million to foster anti-aging research through the non-profit Methuselah Mouse Prize foundation. He gave the following reasons for his pledge: "Rapid advances in biological science foretell of a treasure trove of discoveries this century, including dramatically improved health and longevity for all. I'm backing Dr. [Aubrey] de Grey, because I believe that his revolutionary approach to aging research will accelerate this process, allowing many people alive today to enjoy radically longer and healthier lives for themselves and their loved ones." As of February 2017, he had donated over $7 million to the foundation.

When asked "What is the biggest achievement that you haven't achieved yet?" by the moderator of a discussion panel at the Venture Alpha West 2014 conference, Thiel said he wants to make progress in anti-aging research. Thiel also said that he is registered to be cryonically preserved, meaning that he would be subject to low-temperature preservation in case of his legal death in hopes that he might be successfully revived by future medical technology, and is signed up with the Alcor Life Extension Foundation.

Thiel has expressed interest in the science of parabiosis, including young blood transfusion for potential health benefits. He said in a 2016 Inc. interview that the technology had been found to work on mice before being strangely dropped after the 1950s. The same Inc. article reported that the Thiel Capital medical director Jason Camm had contacted the transfusion startup Ambrosia, but its founder Jesse Karmazin told TechCrunch in a 2017 article that they had never been contacted by Thiel or Thiel Capital. In a 2022 Jacobin article, Ben Burgis characterizes the blood transfusion story as part of a deliberate attempt by Thiel to portray himself as an "evil genius".

==== Seasteading ====
On 15 April 2008, Thiel pledged $500,000 to the newly created non-profit Seasteading Institute, directed by Patri Friedman, whose mission is "to establish permanent, autonomous ocean communities to enable experimentation and innovation with diverse social, political, and legal systems." At one of the institute's conferences, he described seasteading as "one of the few technological frontiers that has the promise to create a new space for human freedom." In 2011, Thiel gave $1.25 million to the Seasteading Institute, but resigned from its board the same year. In a 2017 interview with The New York Times, Thiel said seasteads are "not quite feasible from an engineering perspective" and "still very far in the future".

=== Thiel Fellowship ===
On 29 September 2010, Thiel created the Thiel Fellowship, which annually offers a total of $100,000 (raised to $200,000 since 2025) over two years to 20 people under the age of 23 in order to spur them to drop out of college and create their own ventures. According to Thiel, many young people choose college simply because they're unsure of what else to do with their lives. He envisions a future system that offers different paths for different people, and believes that change in the university system will require external pressure before any internal willingness to adapt can arise, something he compared to the Reformation.

=== Breakout Labs ===
In November 2011, the Thiel Foundation announced the creation of Breakout Labs, a grant-making program intended "to fill the funding gap that exists for innovative research outside the confines of an academic institution, large corporation, or government." It offers grants of up to $350,000 to science-focused start-ups, "with no strings attached". In April 2012, Breakout Labs announced its first set of grantees. In total, 12 startups received funding, for a total of $4.5 million in grants. One of the first ventures to receive funding from Breakout Labs was 3Scan, a tissue imaging platform.

Breakout Ventures is a privately held venture capital firm founded in 2016 out of Breakout Labs to invest in science. Based in San Francisco, California, it invests in early-stage companies in technology, biology, and chemistry focused on human health and sustainability. The program focuses on biotech with a mix of hardware. Its partners include Founders Fund, Formation 8, OATV, Lux Capital, Khosla Ventures among others. Some of its recent investments include Noetik (cancer treatment), Phantom Neuro (neurotechnology). Corpernic Catalysts (catalysts for ammonia production), EnPlusOne Biosciences (RNA therapeutics), Passkey Therapeutics (synergistic multifunctional therapeutics), Cytovale (medical diagnostics).

=== Other causes ===
In 2011, Thiel made a NZ$1 million donation to an appeal fund for the casualties of the Christchurch earthquake.

In Girard's honour, he has established the Imitatio project (part of the philanthropic Thiel Foundation), which aims to "supports research, education, and publications building on Rene Girard's mimetic theory."

== Personal life ==
Thiel resided in San Francisco, California, until 2018, when he moved to Los Angeles. He had criticized San Francisco for being "intolerant of conservatives, insular and overpriced". Both Thiel Capital and Thiel Foundation followed him to Los Angeles, but the Founders Fund remains in San Francisco. Mithril's headquarters moved to Austin. Thiel owns homes all over the world, with his main residence in Miami.

Thiel married his long-time partner, Matt Danzeisen, in Vienna, Austria, on Thiel's 50th birthday (October 2017), when he was reported to have proposed to Danzeisen. Danzeisen started his career as an investment banker at Bank of America Securities. By 2007, when the couple were dating, Danzeisen was vice president of BlackRock. By 2021, he was chairman of Bridgetown 1 and Bridgetown 2, sponsored by Thiel Capital and Richard Li's Pacific Century Group. Sam Altman also sat on the board. Danzeisen also participates in other Thiel enterprises related to the family of Li Ka-shing (father of Richard Li), such as the Malta-based EUM. In 2017 Danzeisen was working as head of private investments at Thiel Capital, with a primary focus on North America and Asia. Thiel and Danzeisen have two young daughters, aged five and three as of June 2024, born through a surrogate. Adrian Wooldridge from Bloomberg reported in August 2025 that Thiel had four children. In 2023, in an interview with the Atlantic, Thiel noted that Danzeisen had tried to dissuade him from donating money to Republicans.

Thiel was in a long-term relationship with model Jeff Thomas until Thomas's suicide in March 2023. Media coverage of Thomas's death drew widespread attention, partly because of Thomas's involvement with Democratic researchers led by David Brock and Jack Bury. Puck.news wrote that the anti-Thiel campaign exposed an undercurrent in modern politics in which there is an increasing tendency towards using people's private problems to achieve political goals.

In 2026, Thiel visited South America, combining "a family vacation" with other activities. He met with leaders like Javier Milei, Santiago Peña, and José Antonio Kast. He also visited Venezuela and Ecuador. He intended to stay in Argentina for two months, buying properties in Argentina and Uruguay.

=== Chess ===
Thiel began playing chess at the age of six and was at one time one of the top junior players in the United States. He holds the title of Life Master, but he has not competed since 2003. On 30 November 2016, Thiel made the ceremonial first move in the first tiebreak game of the World Chess Championship 2016 between Sergey Karjakin and Magnus Carlsen. He said that he stopped trying to become better at chess once he reached a certain level, because he believed excessive chess could become an "alternate reality" requiring "massive tradeoffs with success in other domains of life".

=== Media appearances ===
Thiel is an occasional commentator on CNBC, having appeared on both Closing Bell with Kelly Evans, and Squawk Box with Becky Quick. He has been interviewed twice by Charlie Rose on PBS. He has also contributed articles to The Wall Street Journal, First Things, Forbes, and Policy Review, a journal formerly published by the Hoover Institution, on whose board he sits.

In The Social Network, Thiel was portrayed by Wallace Langham. He described the film as "wrong on many levels". His distaste for the portrayal led to the establishment of the Thiel Fellowship on a whim.

Thiel was the inspiration for the Peter Gregory character on HBO's Silicon Valley. Thiel said of Gregory, "I liked him [...] I think eccentric is always better than evil".

Jonas Lüscher stated in an interview with Basellandschaftliche Zeitung that he based the character Tobias Erkner in his novel Kraft ("Force") on Thiel.

After he hired former Austrian chancellor Sebastian Kurz (following scandals that led to Kurz's resignation) for Thiel Capital in 2022, Jan Böhmermann of the ZDF wrote and performed the satirical song Right time to Thiel that portrayed Thiel as a James Bond villain.

=== New Zealand citizenship ===
Thiel was a German citizen by birth and became an American citizen by naturalization. He received New Zealand citizenship in a private ceremony at the New Zealand consulate in Santa Monica, California, in August 2011; his citizenship status was not made public until 2017. Thiel had visited the country on four occasions prior to his application for citizenship, staying a total of 12 days; the typical residency requirement is 1,350 days in five years. When he applied, Thiel stated he had no intention of living in New Zealand, which is a criterion for citizenship. Then-Minister of Internal Affairs Nathan Guy waived those normal requirements, under an "exceptional circumstances" clause of the Citizenship Act.

Thiel's application cited his contribution to the economy—he had founded a venture capital fund in Auckland before applying, and had invested $7 million in two local companies—as well as a $1 million donation to the 2011 Christchurch earthquake appeal fund. Rod Drury, founder of Xero, also provided a formal reference for Thiel's application. Thiel's case was cited by critics as an example of how New Zealand passports can be bought, something the New Zealand government denied. At the time that his citizenship was revealed, The New Zealand Herald came out with the report that the New Zealand Defence Force, the Security Intelligence Service, and the Government Communications and Security Bureau have long-standing links with Thiel's Palantir.

In 2015, Thiel purchased a 193-hectare (477-acre) estate near Wānaka, which fit the classification of "sensitive land" and required foreign buyers to obtain permission from New Zealand's Overseas Investment Office. Thiel did not require permission, as he was a citizen.

=== Relationship with Jeffrey Epstein ===
Leaked emails (released by the hacker group Handala, which "likely operates out of Iran's Ministry of Intelligence", according to Reuters) show that in 2014, Jeffrey Epstein leveraged his relationship with former Israeli Prime Minister Ehud Barak to get access to Thiel. Epstein arranged for Barak to meet Thiel in New York on June 9, 2014. In 2016, Epstein pitched Reporty (later Carbyne) to Valar, but the proposal got rejected on account of being premature (Epstein invested a total of 40 million in Valar in 2015 and 2016). Valar's McCormack said they would try to reengage when the startup was more developed. In 2018, the Founders Fund joined Carbyne's $15 million Series B.

Thiel said that the subsequent interactions with Epstein following their introduction in 2014 were due to the fact that Epstein was a "crazed networker". One of the people introduced to Thiel by Epstein was the Russian diplomat Vitaly Churkin. Byline Times suggests that Epstein was one of the contact points that Thiel used for his political network in the UK, including with the Labour Party (UK), although there is no record of Thiel's social visits to Epstein's homes or flights on his jet.

Documents reviewed by The Wall Street Journal in 2023 show that there were scheduled meetings (half a dozen between 2014 and 2016) between Thiel and Epstein, including with others such as Woody Allen and Obama's advisor Kathryn Ruemmler. Reid Hoffman, Thiel's friend from the PayPal Mafia and a big Democratic donor, was the one who directly introduced Thiel to Epstein (for years, Epstein acquaintances had tried to invite Thiel to meet Epstein but were rejected) and also participated. Documents from the US House of Representatives showed Epstein invited Thiel to his private island in 2018. A spokesperson for Thiel said he never visited the island. In 2025, Snopes criticized a claim on the internet that Epstein offered girls to Thiel and others as misleading by omitting context.

Euronews writes that there is no known major financial connection between Thiel and Epstein, but Thiel seemed to treat Epstein as a contact point. The San Francisco Standard comments that around the time, other Israeli officials (acting independently of Barak) tried to build contact with Thiel as well, often aiming at a "lucrative" job at Palantir.

=== Awards and honors ===
- In 2006, Thiel won the Herman Lay Award for Entrepreneurship.
- In 2007, he was honored as a Young Global leader by the World Economic Forum as one of the 250 most distinguished leaders age 40 and under.
- On 7 November 2009, Thiel was awarded an honorary degree from Guatemalan Universidad Francisco Marroquin.
- In 2012, Students For Liberty, an organization dedicated to spreading libertarian ideals on college campuses, awarded Thiel its "Alumnus of the Year" award.
- In 2018, German-American Heritage Foundation and Museum (GAHMUSA) honoured Thiel as Distinguished German-American of the Year.
- In 2021, the Frankfurter Allgemeine Zeitung (FAZ) gave him the Frank Schirrmacher prize, which typically honors intellectuals and artists for "outstanding achievements in understanding our current events." The awarding caused some controversies. The Frank Schirrmacher Foundation stated that, "By awarding Thiel the prize, his comprehensive work in analyzing the opportunities and risks of technological progress will be honored [...] disregarding prohibitions on thinking, he provides intellectual impulses and thus enriches the current socio-political discussions in a wide variety of fields."
- On 24 September 2026, German media conglomerate Axel Springer presented Thiel with the Axel Springer Award 2026, claiming that Thiel "has created entirely new markets, transformed existing ones, and made a lasting impact on the technological, economic, and societal debates of our time" and his "critical role in strengthening democratic resilience." The decision generated controversy, with Der Spiegel writing that Axel Springer presents just one half of the story. Süddeutsche Zeitung opined that Thiel's companies provide states what they need to function, but the German right's embracing of Thiel as a figure of hope has implications for democracy, noting that CSU politician Peter Gauweiler has called on the government to make Thiel federal minister for artificial intelligence and technological sovereignty.

== Works ==
=== The Diversity Myth ===
In 1995, the Independent Institute published The Diversity Myth: Multiculturalism and the Politics of Intolerance at Stanford, which Thiel co-authored along with fellow tech entrepreneur David O. Sacks, and with a foreword by the late Emory University historian Elizabeth Fox-Genovese. The book is critical of political correctness and multiculturalism in higher education and alleges that it has diluted academic rigor. The authors also argue that, "You don't have diversity when you gather people who look different but talk and think alike." (Note: The Diversity Myth: "If you stress "diversity", it means that diversity is not real, a fiction. There's no real multiculturalism; it's monocultural. The agenda is not non-Western; it's anti-Western. At Stanford, for instance, multicultural initiatives were funded by slashing the budgets of the university's foreign-language departments. You don't have diversity when you gather people who look different but talk and think alike.")

Thiel and Sacks's writings drew criticism from then-Stanford Provost Condoleezza Rice and then-Stanford President Gerhard Casper in describing Thiel and Sacks's view of Stanford as "a cartoon, not a description of our freshman curriculum", and their commentary as "demagoguery, pure and simple".

In 2016, Thiel apologized for two statements involving the rape crisis movement and date rape that he made in the book.

=== Zero to One ===
In spring 2012, Thiel taught the class CS 183: Startup at Stanford University. Notes for the course, taken by student Blake Masters, led to a book titled Zero to One: Notes on Startups, or How to Build the Future by Thiel and Masters, which was released in September 2014.

Derek Thompson, writing for The Atlantic, stated Zero to One "might be the best business book I've read". He described it as a "self-help book for entrepreneurs, bursting with bromides" but also as a "lucid and profound articulation of capitalism and success in the 21st century economy."

=== "The Straussian Moment" ===
"The Straussian Moment" is an essay written by Thiel in 2004, sometimes considered to be a fundamental text in his political thinking and was the subject of a 2019 interview at the Hoover Institution. The essay draws on several thinkers and political theorists and argues that the September 11 attacks upset "the entire political and military framework of the nineteenth and twentieth centuries", and therefore "a reexamination of the foundations of modern politics" was needed.

=== Others ===
One of Thiel's favorite books is The Sovereign Individual, which was a little-known work before he helped to popularize it. He wrote the preface for the reprinted edition.

Thiel also has a chapter giving advice in Tim Ferriss self-help book Tools of Titans: The Tactics, Routines, and Habits of Billionaires, Icons, and World-Class Performers.

== Bibliography ==
- Galis, Vasilis; Karlsson, Björn (2 October 2024). "A world of Palantir – ontological politics in the Danish police's POL-INTEL". Information, Communication & Society. 27 (13): 2438–2456. doi:10.1080/1369118X.2024.2410255. ISSN 1369-118X.
- Jackson, Eric M. (2004). The PayPal Wars.
- Packer, George (2013), The Unwinding: An Inner History of the New America, Farrar, Straus and Giroux, ISBN 978-0-374-10241-8
