= Synergy Strike Force =

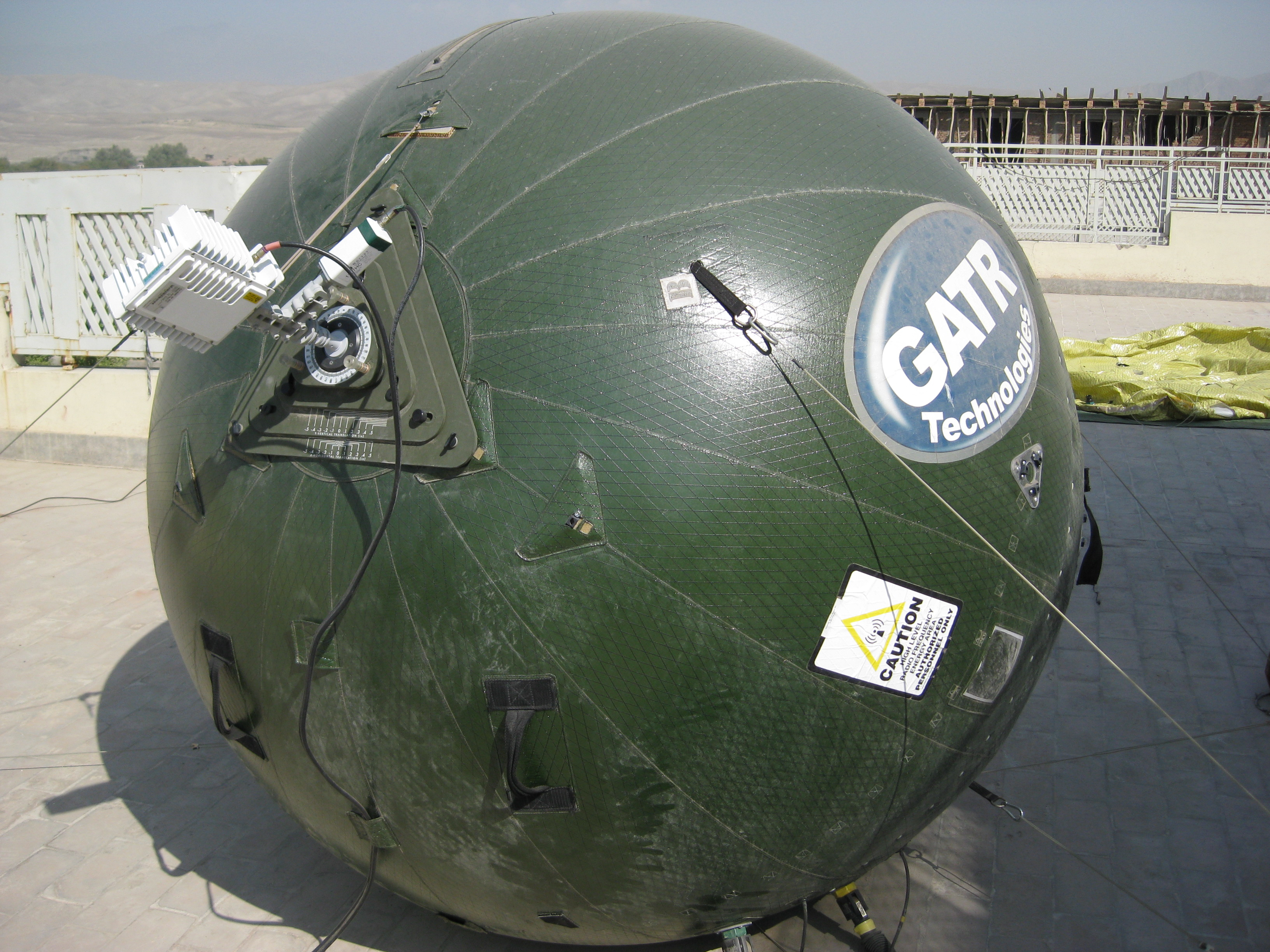
This balloon contained a satellite dish that helped the Taj Mahal guesthouse provide an internet connection to guests, and to high-tech projects in the vicinity.

Synergy Strike Force was the self-chosen informal name of a group of individuals who applied crowdsourcing techniques towards intelligence gathering under the guise of aid work in Afghanistan.

Dave Warner, an MD, neuroscientist and Army veteran, is credited with leading the group and finding funding for it, primarily sourced from DARPA's More Eyes program.

In a profile by Brian Calvert for Pacific Standard magazine, Warner described why the group's headquarters was outside the military security perimeter and field trips were made with a light security presence.

Warner leased the Taj Mahal guesthouse in Jalalabad and supplied it with a rare high-speed internet connection. Western visitors were encouraged to share data they acquired, which would be freely shared with whoever wanted it. Warner said this free data sharing was inspired by the annual Burning Man festival which embraces the concept of "radical inclusion."

Sharon Weinberger, author of a book about DARPA entitled The Imagineers of War, also described the activities of the Synergy Strike Force in detail.

Spencer Ackerman, reporting in Wired magazine, described how the group's funding ran out in 2012 as the war ran down.

Ackerman also noted the contribution made by Todd Huffman, a volunteer who would go on to found hi-tech biomedical imaging firm 3Scan.
