= 3Scan =

American biotechnology company

3Scan, Inc.
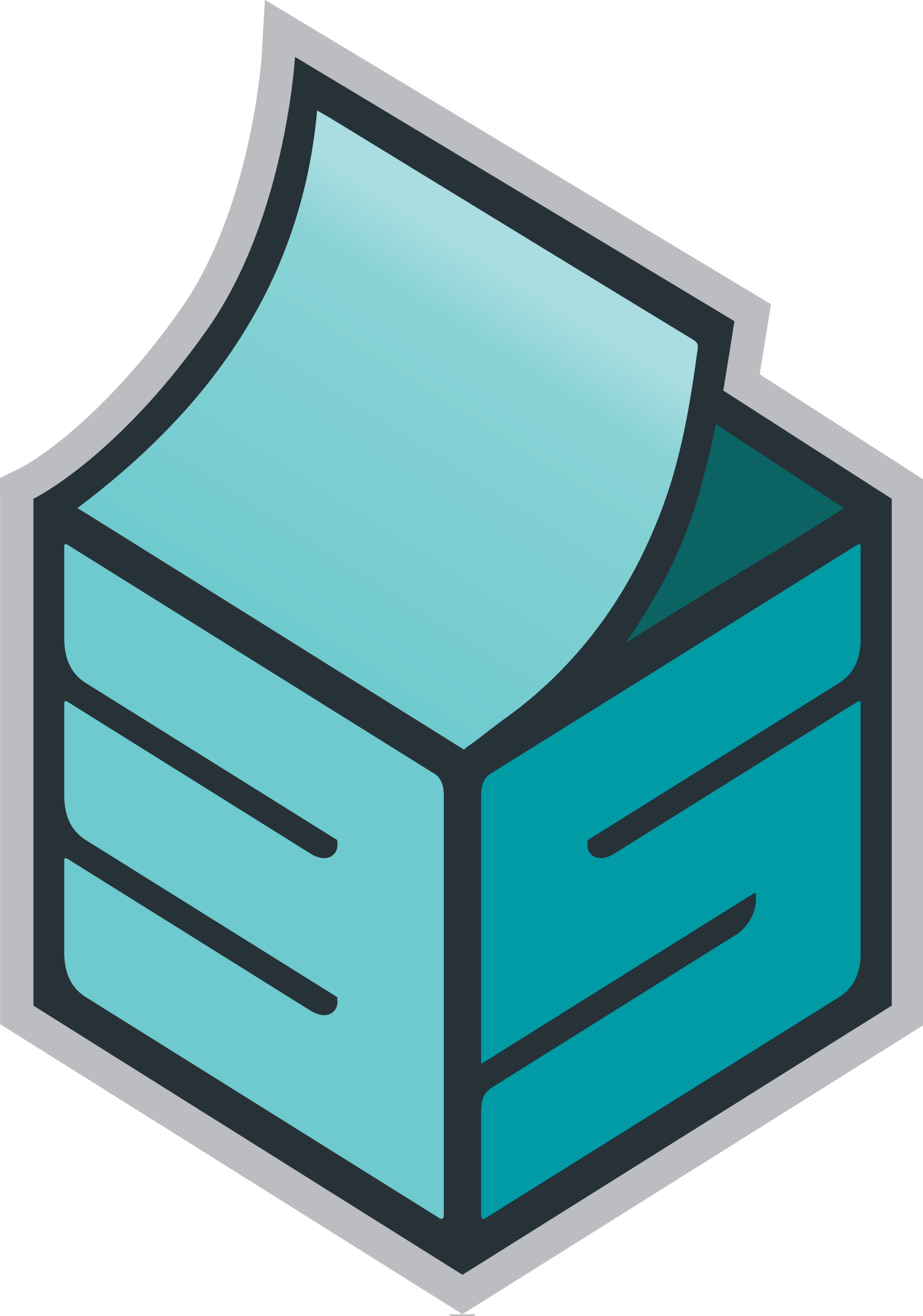
- Type: Private
- Industry: Biotechnology
- Founded: 2011
- Founders: Todd Huffman, Megan Klimen, Matthew Goodman, Cody Daniel
- Fate: Acquired
- Headquarters: San Francisco, California, United States
- Services: Automated tissue image analysis
- Website: www.3scan.com

3Scan, Inc. was an American biotechnology company based in San Francisco, California which was acquired in 2019, when 3Scan became a part of Strateos. It offered automated microscopy services using a coordinated combination of both hardware and software for the 3D analysis of cells, tissues, and organs. The company was founded in 2011 by Todd Huffman, Megan Klimen, Matthew Goodman, and Cody Daniel. The 3Scan technology was based on the Knife Edge Scanning Microscope developed in the late 1990s by Bruce McCormick, founder of the Brain Networks Lab at Texas A&M University.

== History ==
3Scan CEO Todd Huffman originally worked as a neuroinformatics researcher at Texas A&M in 2003 and first encountered the technology which became the core of 3Scan's microscopy services during this time. While the KESM was originally developed as a neuroimaging tool, 3Scan has taken the principles involved in this technology and expanded its use to create a novel type of histology and tissue imaging.

The company raised a total of $22 million through two rounds of equity funding from Lux Capital and Data Collective, joined by Dolby Family Ventures, OS Fund, Comet Labs, and Breakout Ventures, a fund within the Thiel Foundation. They have also raised $390,000 in non-dilutive grant money from institutions such as Breakout Labs and Start-Up Chile. The company employed about 35 full-time employees and generates revenue by providing its imaging services to pharmaceutical companies, labs, or pathologists involved in pre-clinical drug discovery. In 2017, 3Scan was collaborating with pharmaceutical development scientists, academic researchers, and tissue engineers as a contract research organization. It was not currently used for clinical diagnostics, but was in the process of building out a platform to perform clinical pathology and diagnostic services.

In 2018, cofounder Cody Daniel was named on the Forbes 30 Under 30 list.

== Technology ==
3Scan’s technology changed the histology workflow to automate the process of tissue sectioning and imaging. Traditionally, histology slides were prepared by embedding a tissue sample in paraffin, taking some few slices of the tissue with a hand-driven microtome, mounting the tissue slices on slides, and staining with various histology stains. A pathologist then looked at these slides with a microscope. In the workflow developed by 3Scan, tissues were stained, embedded, and then sliced and imaged by the KESM. By automating this process, it became feasible to take slices of and image the entirety of tissue instead of a few representative slides. In addition to taking more sections, 3Scan’s proprietary software was able to computationally realign these sections in order to visualize the 3D structure of the tissue, similar in appearance to a CT scan. It used machine vision to produce a 3D spatial map that researchers can analyze on a screen, similar to a topographical map of the Earth. Using these maps, scientists were also able to analyze parts of tissue and phenomena that were previously not visible, such as changes to blood flow between different tissue samples.

This analysis was not possible using traditional manual histology techniques due to the excessive time involved and lost sections due to folding and warping. 3Scan’s KESM technology was able to perform approximately a year’s worth of tissue sample processing in a single day.
