= Breakout Ventures =

Part of the Thiel Foundation

- Founded: 2016
- Headquarters: 38 Mesa St., San Francisco, CA
- Website: breakout.vc

Breakout Ventures is a privately held venture capital firm founded in 2016. The firm was founded out of Breakout Labs, a program of the Thiel Foundation (a philanthropic organization created by Peter Thiel). The firm is headquartered in San Francisco, California.

Breakout Ventures invests in early-stage companies across technology, biology, and chemistry sectors to build solutions for human health and sustainability. The firm supports science-driven companies moving with urgency throughout their entire life cycle, from seed to scale.

== History ==
Breakout Labs was launched in November 2011. Breakout Labs issued convertible grants for early-stage commercialization of scientific research that was considered too speculative or long-term to interest the for-profit sector (such as angel investors and venture capitalists) but may have been unsuitable for traditional sources of funding for scientific research due to its radical or offbeat nature. Grants were made through a competitive application and selection process.

Breakout Labs announced its first batch of grantees on April 17, 2012, its second batch of grantees on August 15, 2012, and its third batch of grantees in April 2013.

In 2016, Breakout Ventures was founded as a separate entity to provide traditional venture capital investments in science-driven companies, utilizing the Breakout Labs grant program as a way to identify investment opportunities Techcrunch reported in 2018 that Thiel is the fund's anchor investor.

In 2017, Breakout Ventures closed its debut fund was closed with US$60.1 million in commitments.

In 2021, Breakout Labs formerly closed, having provided 50 science focused grants in the program’s 10 year span.

In December 2021, Breakout Venture's second fund was oversubscribed with US$112.5 million in commitments.

== Portfolio ==
The firm focuses on Series-A and Series-B stage science-driven companies. Its financial partners include Founders Fund, Formation 8, OATV, Lux Capital, Khosla Ventures among others. Notable investments include Modern Meadow (biofabrication) and 3Scan. Some of its recent investments include Noetik (cancer treatment), Cytovale (medical diagnostics), Passkey Therapeutics (synergistic multifunctional therapeutics), Corpernic Catalysts (catalysts for ammonia production), EnPlusOne Biosciences (RNA therapeutics), Phantom Neuro (neurotechnology).
