= Thiel Foundation =

Private foundation created and funded by Peter Thiel

The Thiel Foundation
- Formation: 2005; 21 years ago
- Founder: Peter Thiel
- Type: Nonprofit private foundation
- Tax ID no.: 20-3846597 (EIN)
- Legal status: 501(c)(3) organization
- Headquarters: Hollywood, California, United States
- Revenue: $5.74 million (2022)
- Expenses: $7.43 million (2021)
- Website: thielfoundation.org

The Thiel Foundation is an American private foundation created and funded by billionaire Peter Thiel, co-founder of PayPal and an early investor in Facebook.

== Theory of philanthropy ==
Thiel concentrates the bulk of his philanthropic efforts on what he sees as potential breakthrough technologies. In November 2010, Thiel organized a Breakthrough Philanthropy conference that showcased eight nonprofits that he believed were working on radical new ideas in technology, government, and human affairs. A similar conference was organized in December 2011 with the name "Fast Forward".

== Internal projects ==
The Thiel Foundation had three main internal projects: the Thiel Fellowship, Imitatio, and Breakout Labs.

=== Thiel Fellowship ===
The Thiel Fellowship (originally named 20 under 20) is intended for young visionaries under the age of 20 and offers them a total of $100,000 over two years as well as guidance and other resources to drop out of school and pursue other work, which could involve scientific research, creating a startup, or working on a social movement. Selection for the fellowship is through a competitive annual process, with about 20–25 fellows selected annually. Peter Thiel announced the fellowship at TechCrunch Disrupt in September 2010. The first round of fellows, based on applications made at the end of 2010, was announced in May 2011.

=== Imitatio ===
Imitatio is a project funded by the Thiel Foundation that aims to understand the world through the lens of Rene Girard's mimetic theory.

=== Breakout Labs ===
Breakout Labs was a grant-making body operating as part of the Thiel Foundation. Breakout Labs gives grants for early-stage scientific research that is too speculative or long-term to interest the for-profit sector (such as angel investors and venture capitalists) but may be unsuitable for traditional sources of funding for scientific research due to its radical or offbeat nature. Grants are made through a competitive application and selection process. Breakout Labs announced its first batch of grantees on April 17, 2012, and its second batch of grantees on August 15, 2012. Breakout Labs was succeeded by Breakout Ventures.

== Other organizations supported ==
The Thiel Foundation supports outside groups in three main areas: freedom, science and technology, and anti-violence. Some of the prominent organizations that have received major grants from the Thiel Foundation are described below.

=== Machine Intelligence Research Institute ===
Thiel believes in the importance and desirability of a technological singularity. The Foundation has given over $1,627,000 to MIRI. In February 2006, Thiel provided $100,000 of matching funds to back the Singularity Challenge donation drive of the Machine Intelligence Research Institute (then known as the Singularity Institute for Artificial Intelligence). Additionally, he joined the Institute's advisory board and participated in the May 2006 Singularity Summit at Stanford as well as at the 2011 Summit held in New York City.

In May 2007, Thiel provided half of the $400,000 matching funds for the annual Singularity Challenge donation drive.

The organization was a participant in the Breakthrough Philanthropy conference (November 2010) and the Fast Forward conference (December 2011).

=== Anti-aging research: SENS Foundation ===
In September 2006, Thiel announced that he would donate $3.5 million to foster anti-aging research through the Methuselah Mouse Prize foundation. He gave the following reasons for his pledge: "Rapid advances in biological science foretell of a treasure trove of discoveries this century, including dramatically improved health and longevity for all. I'm backing Dr. Aubrey de Grey, because I believe that his revolutionary approach to aging research will accelerate this process, allowing many people alive today to enjoy radically longer and healthier lives for themselves and their loved ones."

The Thiel Foundation supports the research of the SENS Foundation, headed by Dr. de Grey, that is working to achieve the reversal of biological aging. The Thiel Foundation also supports the work of anti-aging researcher Cynthia Kenyon.

=== Seasteading ===
On April 15, 2008, Thiel pledged $500,000 to the new Seasteading Institute, directed by Patri Friedman, whose mission is "to establish permanent, autonomous ocean communities to enable experimentation and innovation with diverse social, political, and legal systems." In February 2010 he provided a subsequent grant of $250,000, with an additional $100,000 in matching funds.

In 2011, Thiel was reported as having given a total of $1.25 million to the Seasteading Institute.

=== Other organizations ===
The Thiel Foundation is also a supporter of the Committee to Protect Journalists, which promotes the right of journalists to report the news freely without fear of reprisal, and the Human Rights Foundation, which organizes the Oslo Freedom Forum.

Thiel has also supported the life extension group, the Methuselah Foundation, founded by Aubrey De Grey.
