= BIL Conference =

Participant-organized conference series

The BIL Conference is an open, self-organizing, emergent arts, science, society, and technology unconference organized and observed by the participants. It was founded in 2007 by Cody Marx Bailey, Todd Huffman, Bill Erickson, Megan Klimen and others who volunteered to help with the idea.

BIL started as an unaffiliated unconference satellite to TED’s structured, invite-only, paid conference. Anyone can come, and anyone is able to sign up to speak, limited only by space and time. The unconference structure allows for egalitarian treatment of anyone in any role; everyone is encouraged to participate where they can, whether via cleanup, setup, getting coffee, listening, AV work, blogging the conference, registration, etc.

== Background ==
BIL's mission statement is "BIL is an open, self-organizing, emergent, arts, science, society, and technology unconference."

There is no permanent staff or location, no one that organizes or speaks is paid, and even the acronym changes to reflect the will of the participants.

== History ==
The name BIL was proposed because it was catchy, short, and unclaimed. It also humorously referenced the 1989 film Bill & Ted's Excellent Adventure.

The week of BIL 2008, the number of RSVPs had eclipsed the space limitations and the group was forced to announce that they were full. Subsequent BILs have been hosted in Long Beach, Vancouver, and San Francisco, timed with TED whenever possible. BIL went on to have conferences worldwide - Afghanistan, India, England, France, Canada and Tunisia, to name a few. There are also subject-focused variants such as BIL:PIL mirroring TEDMED, and JIL for women.

After the first BIL, the TED organization contacted BIL leaders for advice on what later became their TEDx brand for individuals hosting their own versions of TED. They launched 3 months after the 2nd BIL. The core difference between TEDx and BIL is the amount of overhead and restrictions. TEDx requires that each applicant be thoroughly screened and already have conference experience.
