= Sharon Weinberger =

American journalist

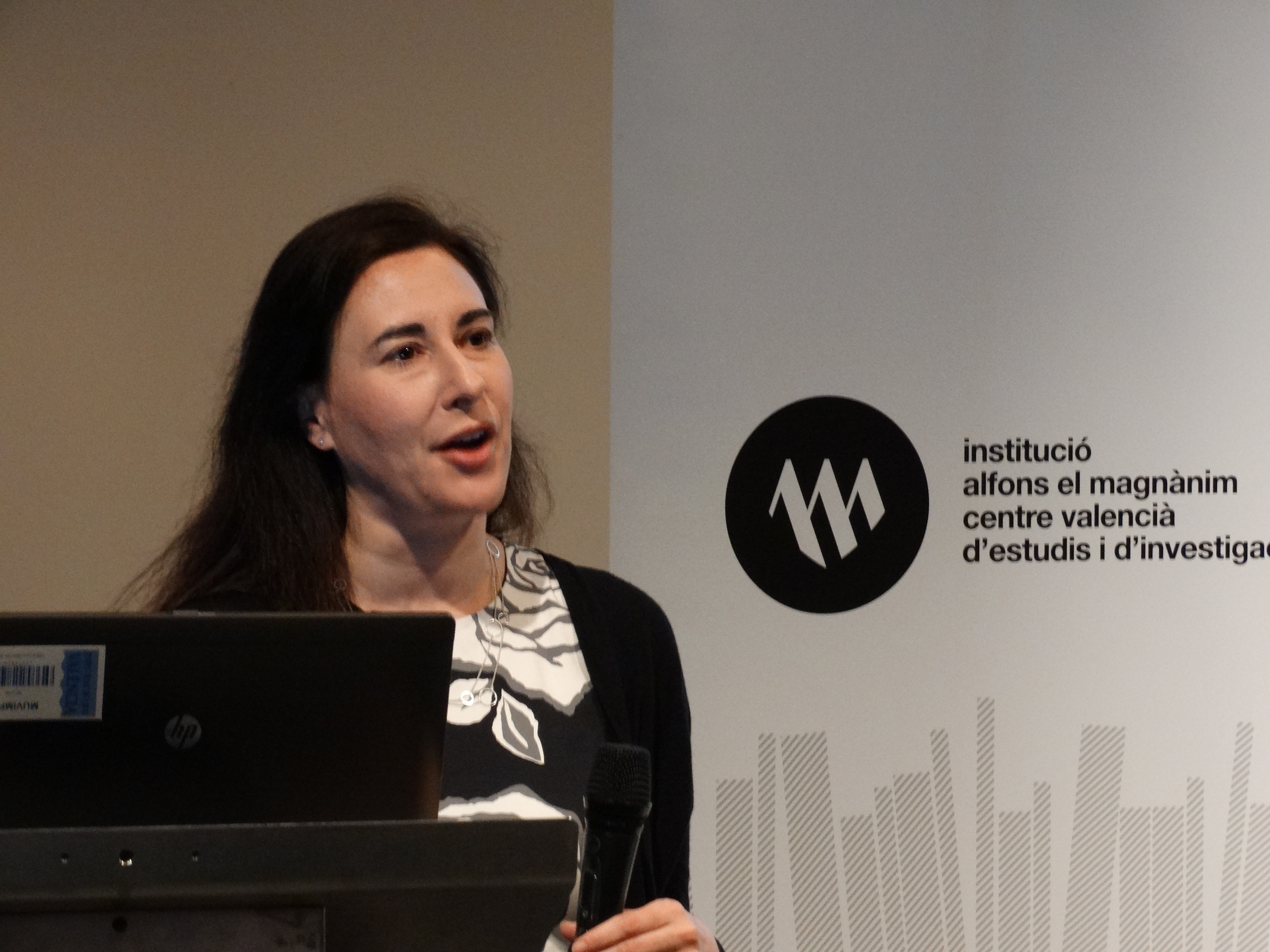
- Sharon Weinberger in Valencia, 2017.
- Education: Johns Hopkins University, University of Pittsburgh; Yale University
- Spouse: Nathan Hodge
- Writing career
- Genre: non-fiction
- Notable work: Toward a Fortress Europe

Sharon Weinberger is an American journalist and writer on defense and security issues.

She was editor for news at Foreign Policy. She is editor in chief of the Bulletin of the Atomic Scientists.

== Education and early career ==
Weinberger holds a B.A. from Johns Hopkins University, where she was elected to the honor society Phi Beta Kappa, and M.A.'s from the University of Pittsburgh Graduate School of Public and International Affairs in International Affairs and from Yale University in Russian and East European Studies.

She has also worked as a defense analyst for System Planning Corporation (SPC), a research, electronics and computer software company working for the US DoD, where her work focused on such areas as arms export policy, the Department of Defense laboratory system. Together with Dov S. Zakheim she co-authored a study for the think tank, the Center for Strategic and International Studies entitled Toward a Fortress Europe published in 2000.

== Journalist and author ==
She has written for Wired's national security blog, Danger Room. She was editor-in-chief of Defense Technology International, a monthly magazine published by the McGraw Hill Aviation Week Group. She has written on science and technology policy for periodicals such as Slate, the Financial Times, The Wall Street Journal, and the Washington Post Magazine. Her first book, Imaginary Weapons, describes a dispute over a weapons concept based on nuclear isomers.

During the Autumn of 2008 and Spring of 2009 she took a sabbatical to become a Knight Fellow in science journalism at MIT. She was a Carnegie/Newhouse School Legal Reporting Fellow, where her "project will examine a legally murky intersection between ethics and fraud in military contracting". Starting in Autumn 2009 she became an International Reporting Project fellow at the Johns Hopkins University School of Advanced International Studies (SAIS).

Weinberger won an Alicia Patterson Journalism Fellowship in 2011 to research and write about how the science of Facebook is changing modern warfare. In November 2014, Weinberger became national security editor of The Intercept to head its investigative reporting on intelligence, military affairs, government surveillance, and the Edward Snowden archive.

She has written for Foreign Policy and Slate on aspects of life in the Gaza Strip.

== Personal life ==
She is married to fellow national security journalist, Nathan Hodge with whom she co-authored A Nuclear Family Vacation: Travels in the World of Atomic Weaponry in which they describe visits to current and past nuclear weapons sites and meetings with some of the people involved with nuclear weapons programmes.

== See also ==
- Montgomery McFate
- John B. Alexander
- Essence (biological defense program)
- Ghost imaging
- Sniffex
- Amir-Abbas Fakhravar
- Nisour Square massacre
- National Ignition Facility
- International Traffic in Arms Regulations
- Imperial Hubris
- Ballotechnics
- 2007 Osama bin Laden video

== Bibliography ==
- Imaginary Weapons: A Journey Through the Pentagon's Scientific Underworld (2006) ISBN 1-56025-849-7.
- A Nuclear Family Vacation: Travels in the World of Atomic Weaponry (2008) ISBN 1-59691-378-9.
- The Imagineers of War: The Untold Story of DARPA, the Pentagon Agency that Changed the World, New York, Alfred A. Knopf, 2017. ISBN 9780385351799.
- Valley of Death: How Big Tech Is Fueling the Future of War, New York, Little, Brown and Copmpany, 2026. ISBN 978-0316595933.
