= FabFi =

Open-source wireless mesh networking system

FabFi is an open-source, city-scale, wireless mesh networking system. It is an inexpensive framework for sharing wireless internet from a central provider across a town or city. It was developed originally by FabLab, Jalalabad to provide high-speed internet to parts of Jalalabad, Afghanistan. It is also designed for high performance across multiple hops.

== Background ==
In January 2009, the Jalalabad FabLab wanted to bring high-speed internet to a village, hospital, university, and an NGO in the city. It used this low-cost design, building on a system designed to track sheep in Norway. The system could be easily extended to other villages and towns, and was designed to work consistently through heavy rain, smog, and trees.

Community members who used the fab lab received training and experience with the system for a month, after which they were given control and maintenance of it. Many locations began to join the initial nodes, expanding the mesh over the coming months. The longest link in the system was set up early on, between the FabLab and the water tower at the public hospital in Jalalabad.

== FabFi around the world ==
=== Afghanistan ===
Jalalabad has 45 remote FabFi nodes, with the longest link spanning 6 km. The total data throughput is 11.5 Mbit/s. The system is extensible by anyone without getting central permission, simply by adding a node and pointing it in the right direction.

The materials needed to make an endpoint link are $60US, and are available locally. An endpoint node that provides 360-degree coverage of the area near it might use more hardware and cost closer to $150US.

Additional sites in Afghanistan are being considered.

=== Kenya ===
Kenya has 50 remote FabFi nodes deployed across three sites. The longest link among them is 3.5 km. The data throughput across roughly 2.5 km, with up to 6 hops, exceeds 30 Mbit/s.

This system is designed to get Wi-Fi directly to people's homes, and manages users and billing - a feature not yet rolled back into the global codebase or that used in Afghanistan.

=== Future sites and testbeds ===
As of mid-2011, FabFi systems were being tested in the United States.
