= Knife-edge scanning microscope =

The Knife-Edge Scanning Microscope (KESM) was invented and patented in the late 1990s by Bruce McCormick at Texas A&M University. The microscope is intended to produce high-resolution data sets in order to reconstruct 3D cellular structures.

The machine is capable of handling tissue volumes of 1 to 100mm^{3}, recording large volumes of tissue in a small amount of time (~7mm^{2}s^{−1}). The resolution and scanning speed of KESM is a novel method for imaging tissue at resolutions sufficient to reconstruct maps of cellular distribution and morphology. The technique preserves the alignment of serial sections accurately enough to reconstruct neuronal processes and microvasculature.
