= Shox (disambiguation) =

Shox is an arcade rally racing video game developed by EA UK.

Shox or SHOX may also refer to:

- Short-stature homeobox gene (SHOX)
  - SHOX2, short-stature homeobox gene 2
- shox (gamer) (born 1992), French professional gamer
- Nike Shox, a shoe style by Nike
- Shock absorber, informally "shox"

== See also ==
- Shoxx
