= Jordan Geller =

American sneaker collector (born 1977)

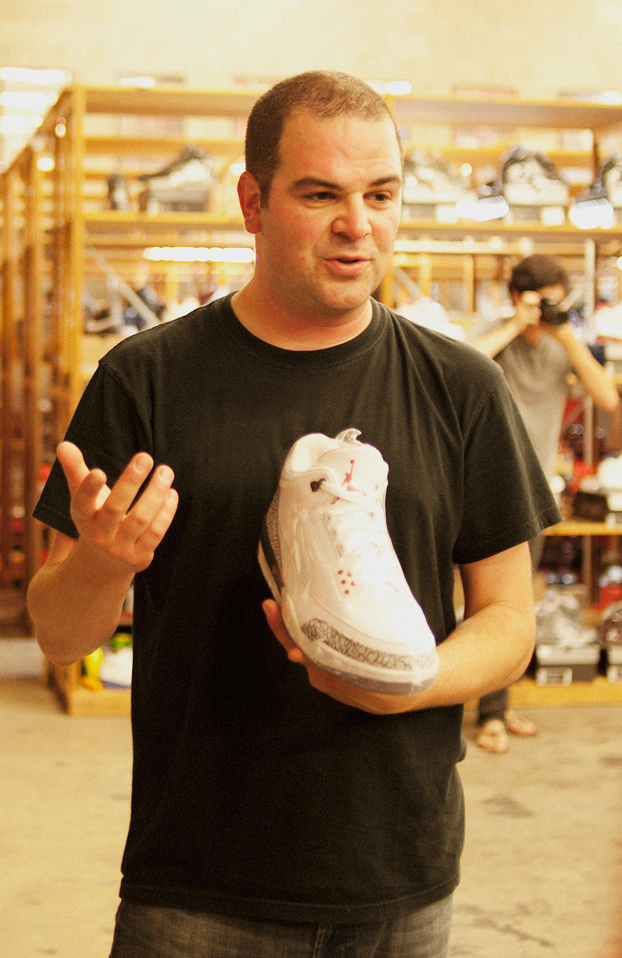
- Geller giving a tour of the ShoeZeum in 2011
- Born: Jordan Michael Geller; 1977 (age 48–49); Los Angeles, California, U.S.
- Education: University of Arizona (BA); University of San Diego (MBA); University of San Diego School of Law (JD)
- Occupations: Sneaker collector; sneaker reseller
- Spouse: Natalie Geller (m. 2014)
- Awards: Guinness World Record holder (2012)
- Website: shoezeum.com

Jordan Michael Geller (born 1977) is an American sneaker collector who founded and operated the ShoeZeum, the world's first sneaker museum. In 2012, Geller was certified by Guinness World Records for having the largest sneaker collection in the world, at 2,388 pairs. (Note: Geller was certified in May 2012 and his entry was included in the 2013 edition of Guinness World Records.)

Geller earned a Juris Doctor degree and passed the bar examination but has never practiced law. Instead, Geller resold sneakers for a living via eBay. After Geller was banned from shopping at Nike in 2009, he transformed his San Diego warehouse into a museum for sneakers, which he called the ShoeZeum. The ShoeZeum contained an assortment of Nike and Air Jordan sneakers and was visited by top Nike executives, including then-CEO Mark Parker, in 2011. Geller moved the ShoeZeum to Las Vegas in 2012, where he was featured on an episode of the reality TV show Pawn Stars.

Geller has collected or sold several Nike "Moon Shoes"—some of the earliest Nike sneakers designed by Nike co-founder Bill Bowerman—including an unworn pair that he sold at a Sotheby's auction for a record-breaking US$437,500 in 2019. (Note: The Moon Shoes feature a "waffle sole" and got its name as it resembled the pattern astronauts left on the Moon's surface during 1969 Moon landing.) Geller would end up breaking his own record a year later when he sold a pair of game-worn and autographed Air Jordan 1s for over half a million dollars at auction. Geller has auctioned off numerous other coveted sneakers during his career. Since closing the ShoeZeum in 2012, Geller has sold the majority of his sneaker collection.

== Early life ==
Geller grew up in Southern California. His father was a real estate agent and a 10-time marathon runner, who reportedly only wore Nike sneakers, while his mother worked as a contemporary artist. He is the oldest of three siblings. Geller was an avid collector of Garbage Pail Kids, baseball cards, and basketball cards during his youth. Geller's parents refused to purchase him any Air Jordans as a child, deeming them too expensive, so he acquired his first pair of Air Jordans while in college for $125. Geller's name is coincidentally close to basketball player Michael Jordan, who is also the namesake of Geller's favorite sneakers. Geller attended the University of Arizona from 1995 to 1999, where he was a political science major. Geller later earned his MBA and his J.D. from the University of San Diego, and he passed the California State Bar Exam in the early 2000s but has never practiced law. His randomly assigned attorney ID number–234523–corresponds to the two jersey numbers Michael Jordan wore during his NBA career.

== Career ==
=== ShoeZeum ===
During his time in law school, Geller visited local swap meets and outlets to purchase Nikes that he later resold for a profit on his eBay business, Sneak's Kicks. At his peak, Geller owned 15,000 pairs of sneakers. Geller received a letter from Nike in 2009 informing him that he was banned from shopping from any of their stores.

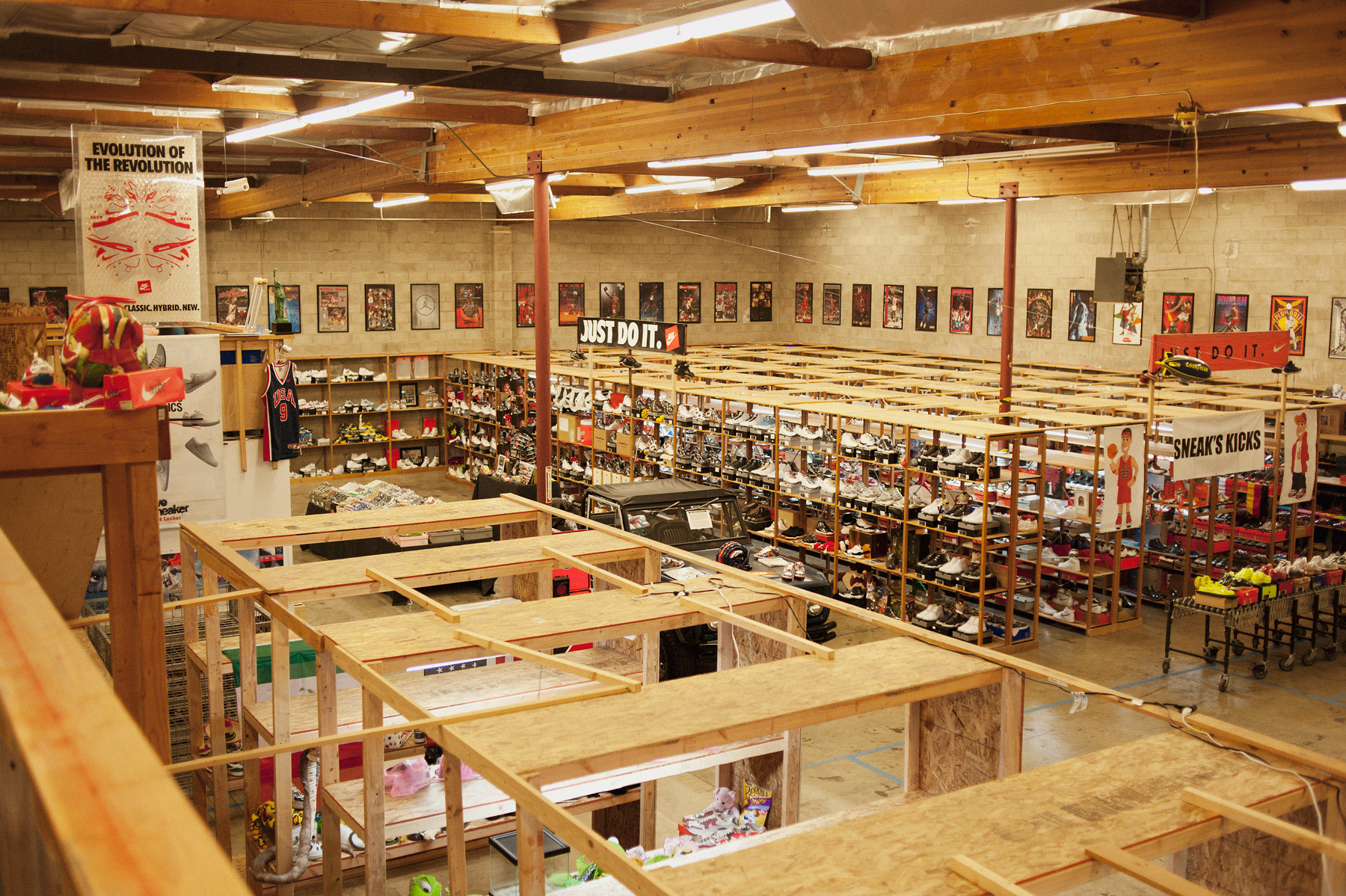
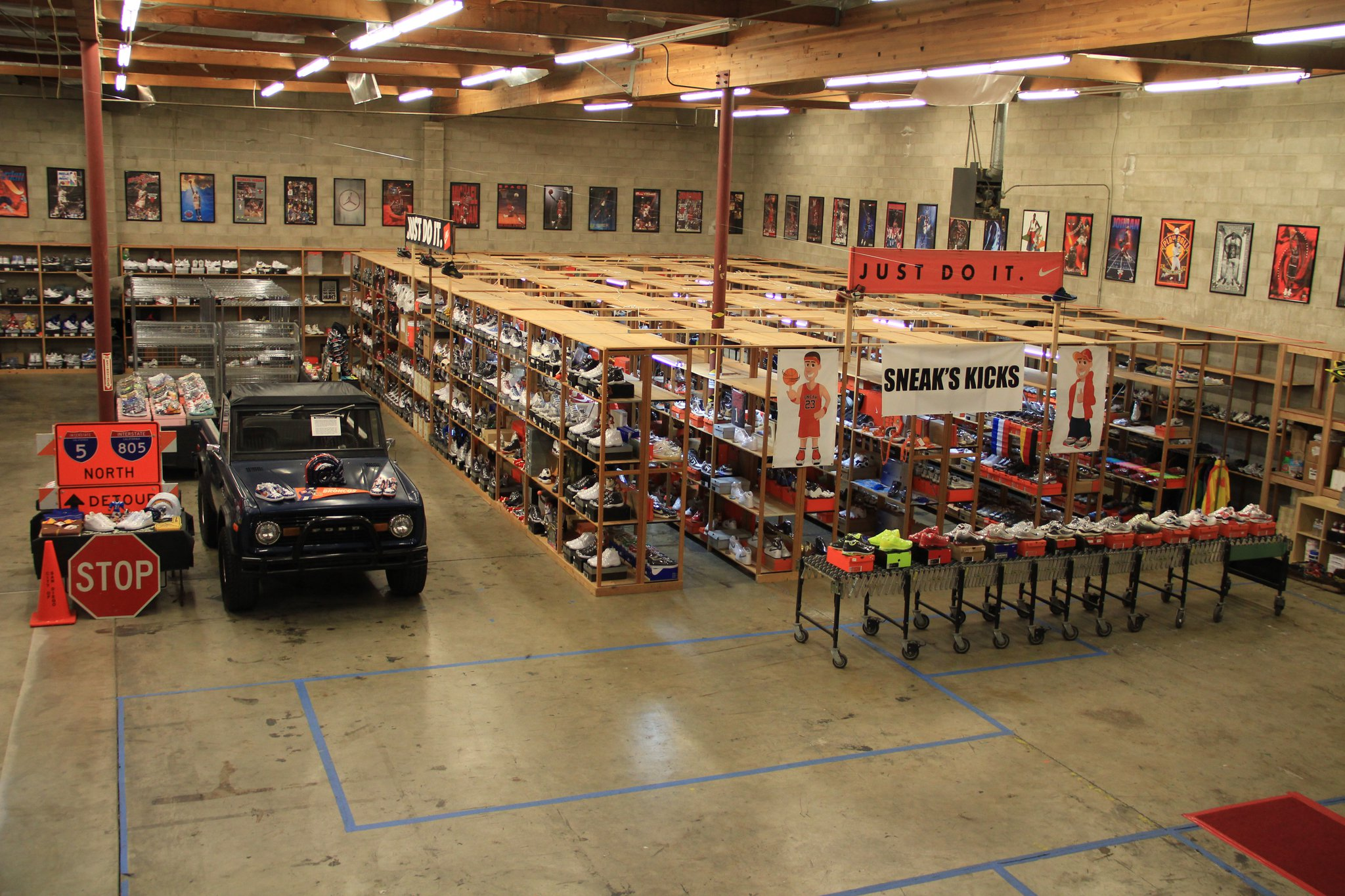
The ShoeZeum when it was originally in San Diego.

Geller stored his inventory in a 9,000 sq ft (840 m^{2}) warehouse located in San Diego. Geller decided to sell off his inventory and use the money to "curate the world's greatest sneaker collection." In 2010, Geller converted his online reselling business into a museum for shoes, called the ShoeZeum, which initially displayed around 2,000 pairs of sneakers. The ShoeZeum became the world's first sneaker museum. The museum was outfitted with toys, posters, and other complementary memorabilia. Geller's inspiration for the ShoeZeum included Willy Wonka & the Chocolate Factory, Field of Dreams, The Last Lecture, Man on Wire, and Walt Disney.

Geller sent invitations to Nike executives to tour his museum. On March 21, 2011, seven top Nike executives, including then-CEO Mark Parker and designer Tinker Hatfield, accepted Geller's invitation and visited the ShoeZeum. Subsequently, Nike paid the ShoeZeum's rent for three months while other executives toured the facility. In total, 67 Nike executives visited the warehouse, according to Geller. Others who have seen the ShoeZeum include businesswoman Meg Whitman and baseball player Mike Adams. Before the ShoeZeum was open to the public, Geller auctioned off five "golden tickets" for a private tour of his warehouse, with all the proceeds benefiting the Livestrong Foundation.

Geller told the Las Vegas Sun he wanted more people to experience his museum, so he moved the ShoeZeum to Las Vegas in 2012. On August 30, the ShoeZeum re-opened in a 7,500 sq ft (700 m^{2}) rented space at the Neonopolis shopping center in downtown Las Vegas. At the grand opening, the ribbon was cut by Mayor Carolyn Goodman. The museum contained 23 themed exhibits that displayed an array of Nike sneakers. Geller and the ShoeZeum were featured on an episode of the reality TV show Pawn Stars, where Geller attempted to sell his collection. With 2,388 pairs of sneakers, Geller was certified by Guinness World Records for having the largest sneaker collection in the world. The ShoeZeum eventually topped over 2,500 pairs of sneakers. Geller's museum contained one of every Air Jordan model ever made, and all but eight sneakers in the ShoeZeum were Nikes.

Geller closed the ShoeZeum in November 2012, commenting that "having a sneaker museum is just not sustainable." The owner of the Neonopolis stated that the short-lived operation of the ShoeZeum was all "according to plan," and a brewery was expected to replace the ShoeZeum. Geller and the ShoeZeum were included on lists of "wild" world records by CBS News and "most ridiculous" world records by BuzzFeed News.

Selected images from the ShoeZeum

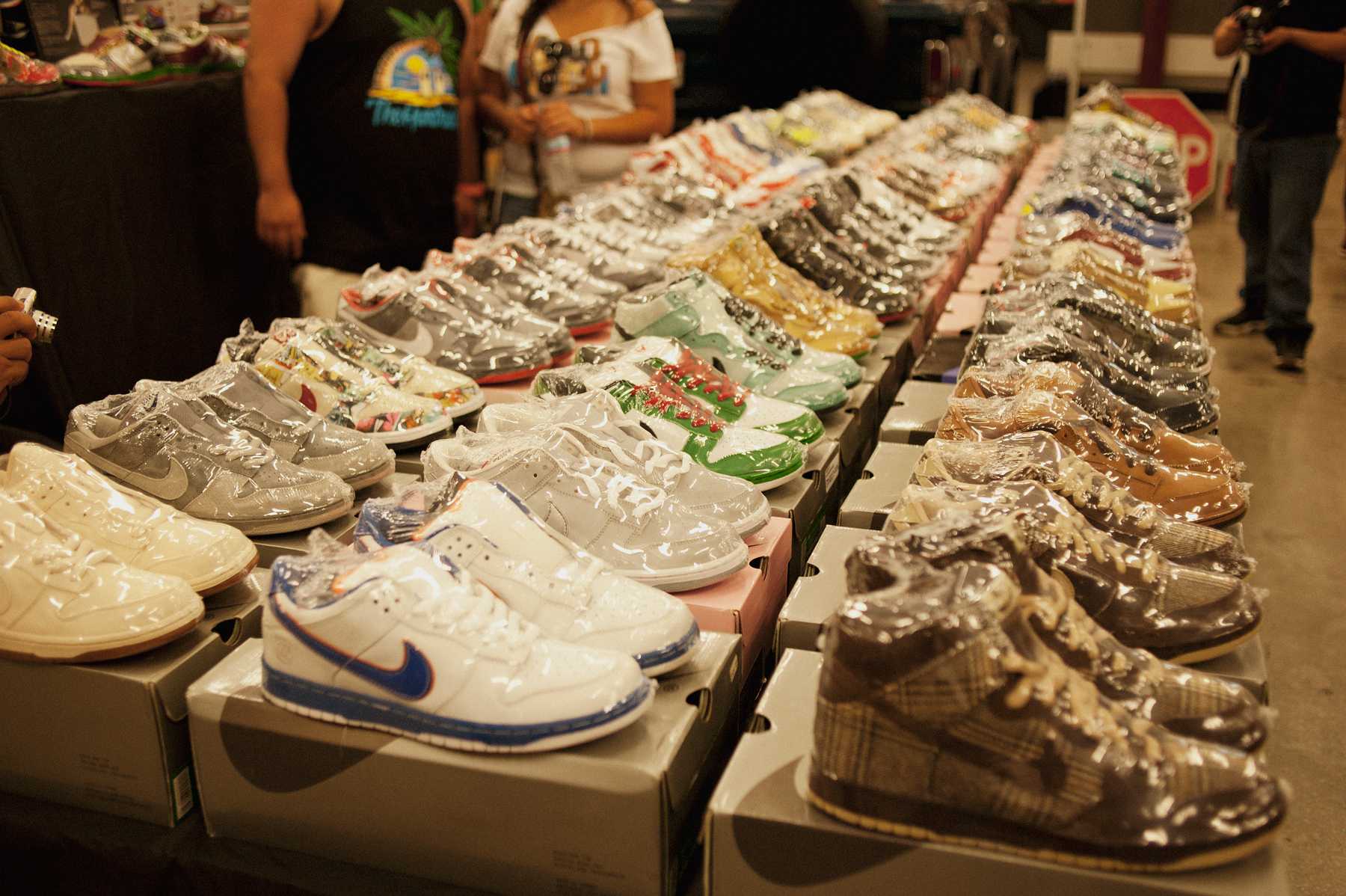
Rows of Nike SBs

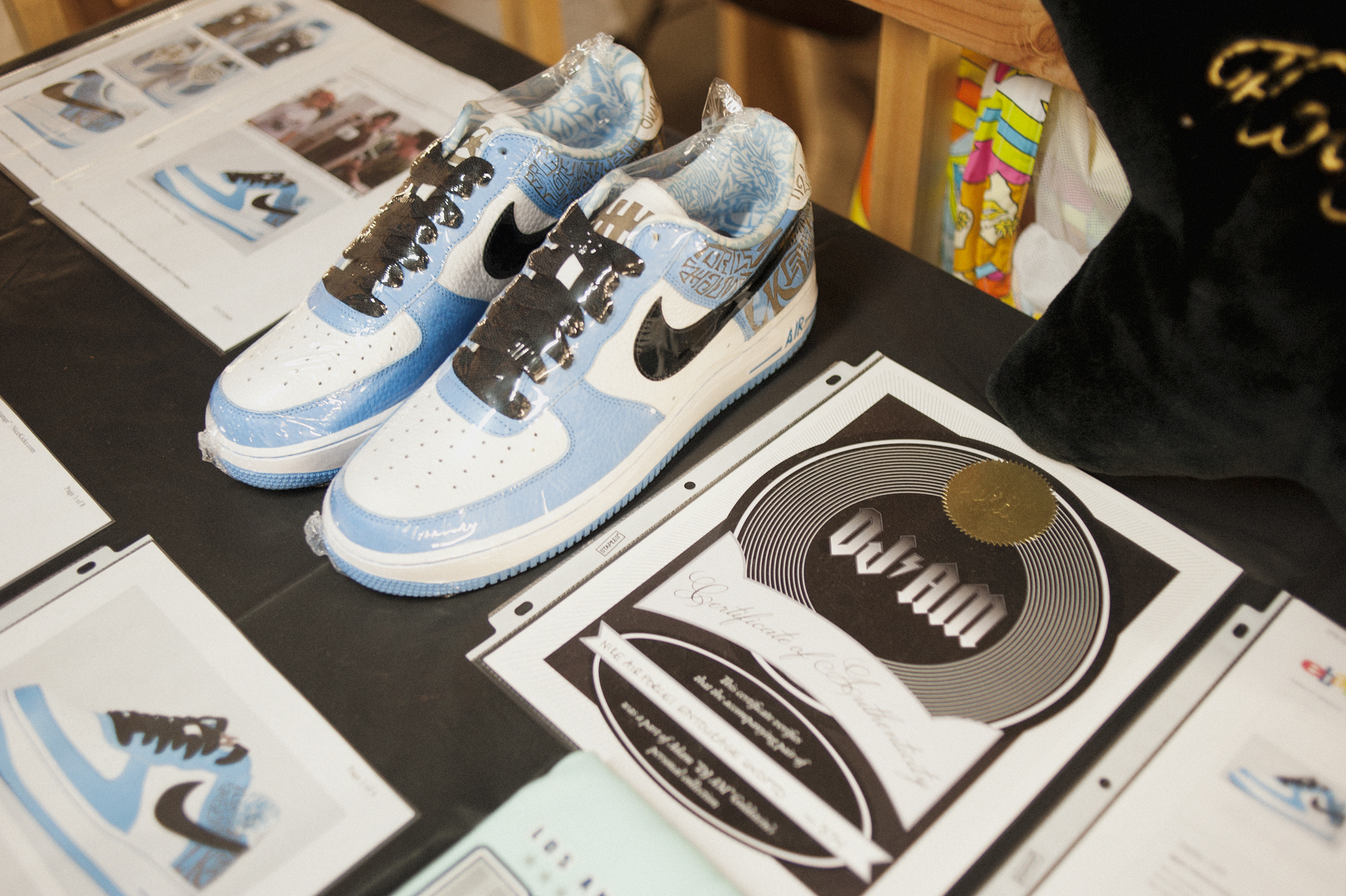
DJ AM's Air Force 1s

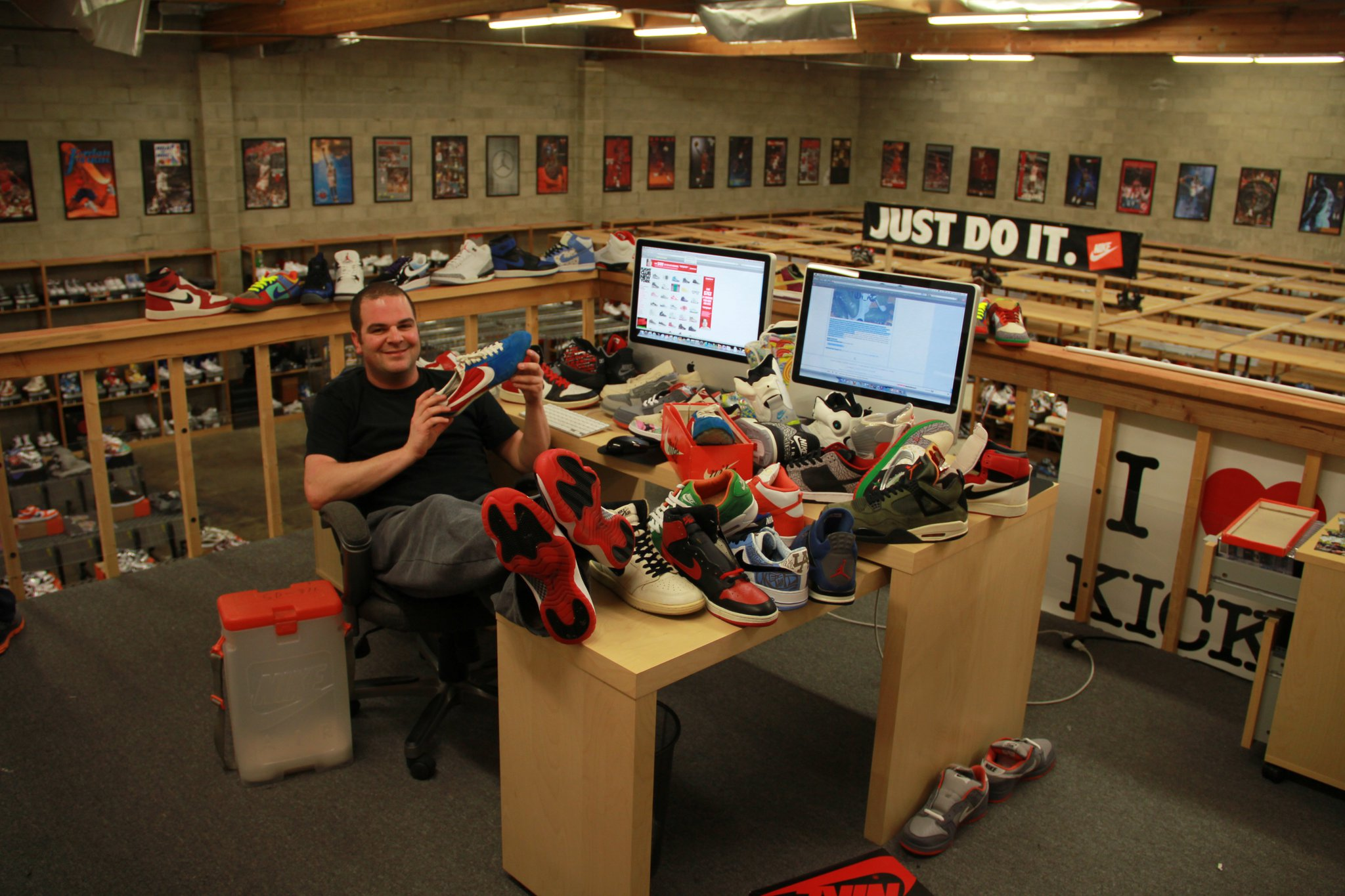
Geller sitting at his desk at the ShoeZeum

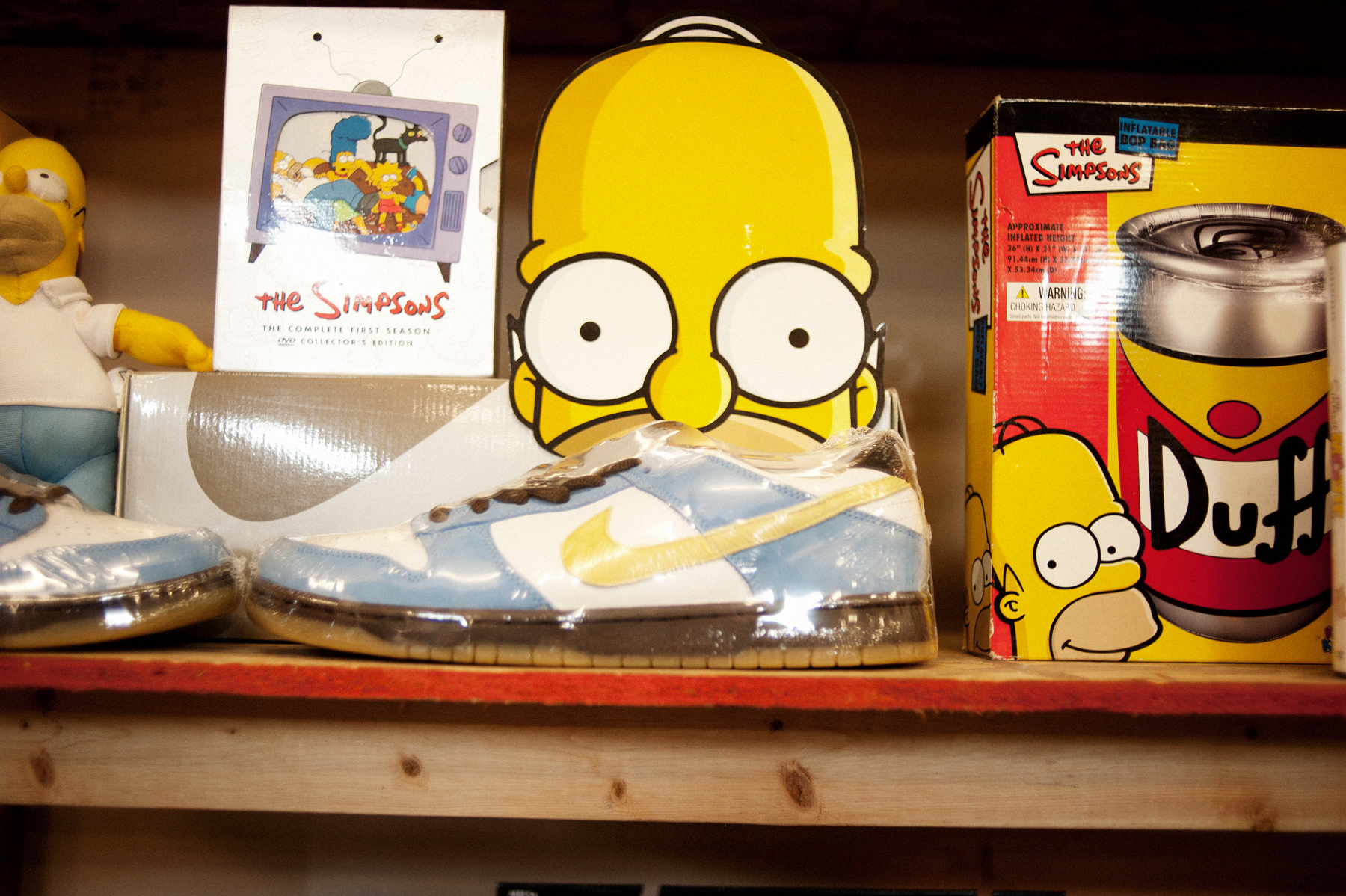
Nike SBs inspired by Homer Simpson

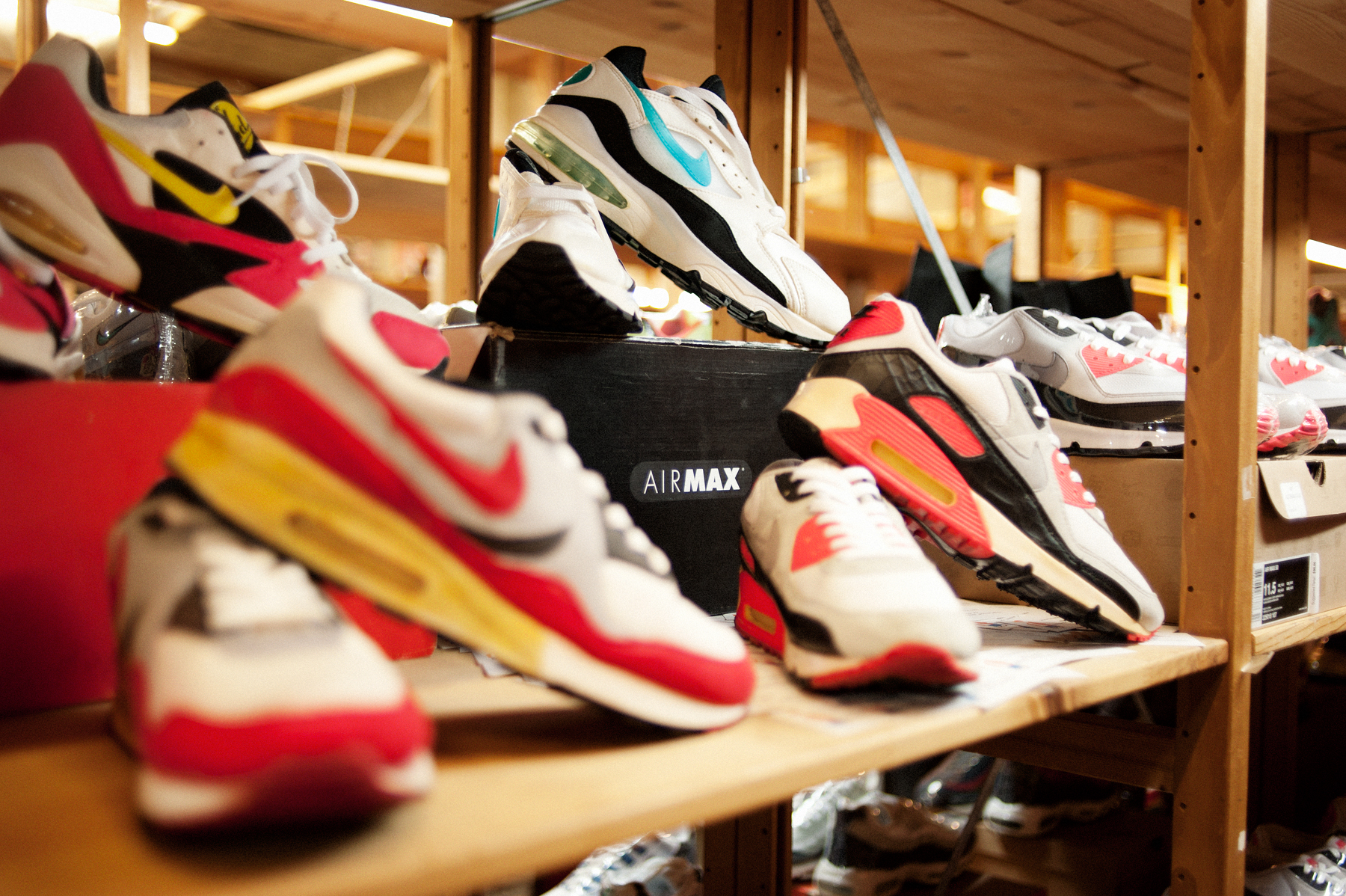
Nike Air Maxes

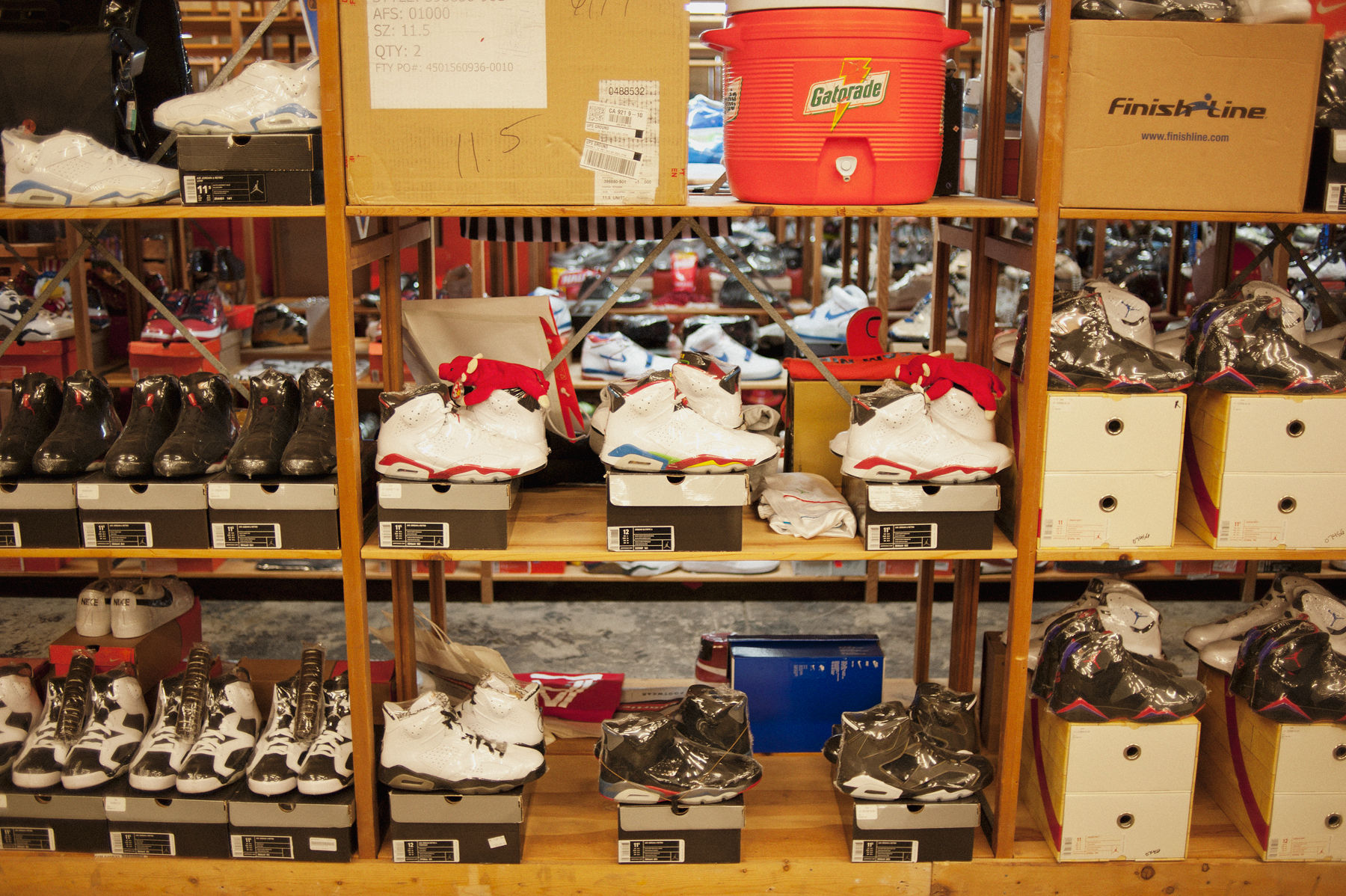
A wall of Air Jordan sneakers

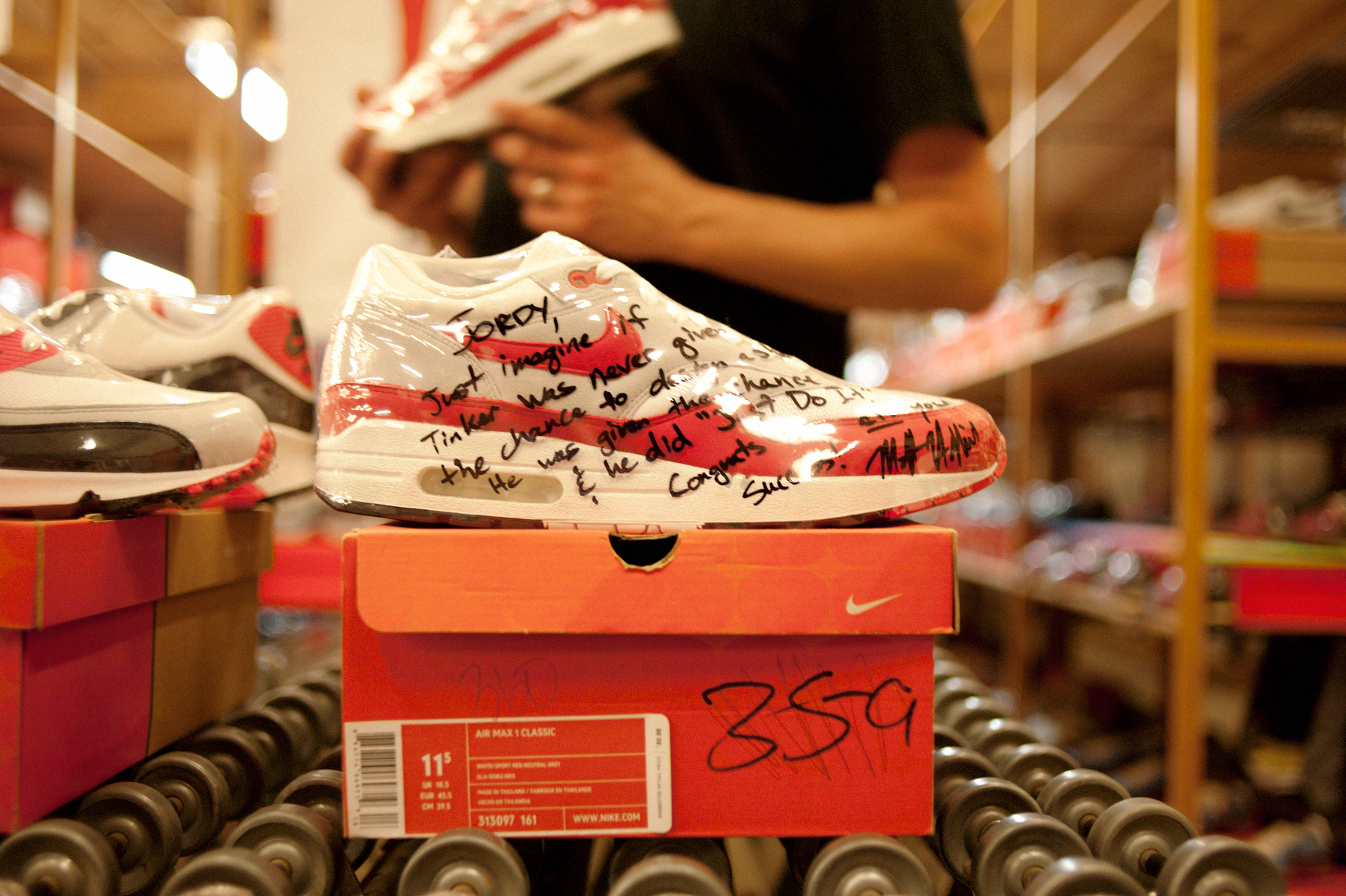
Nike Air Maxes autographed by Nice Kicks founder Matt Halfhill

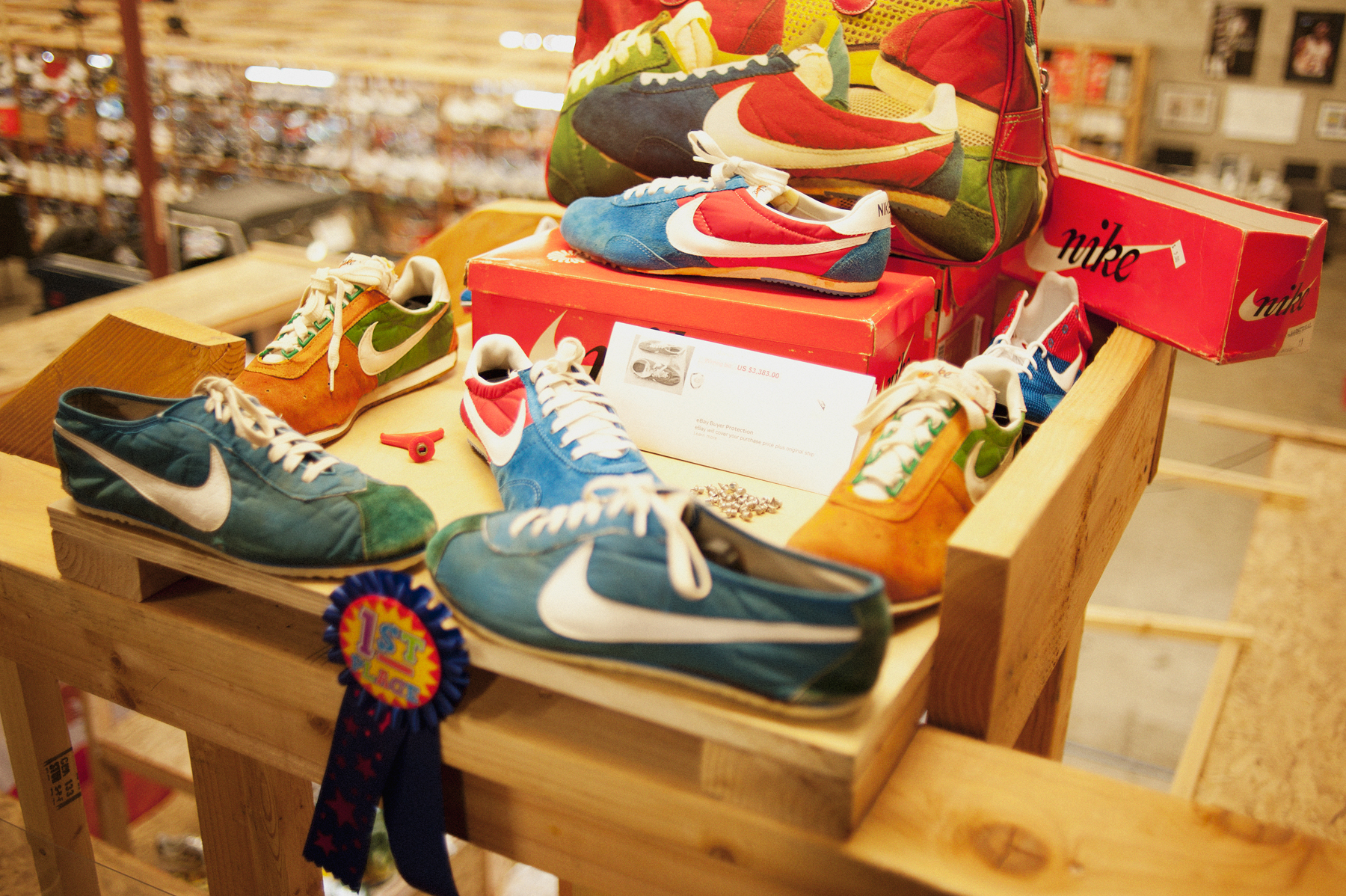
Vintage Nike running shoes

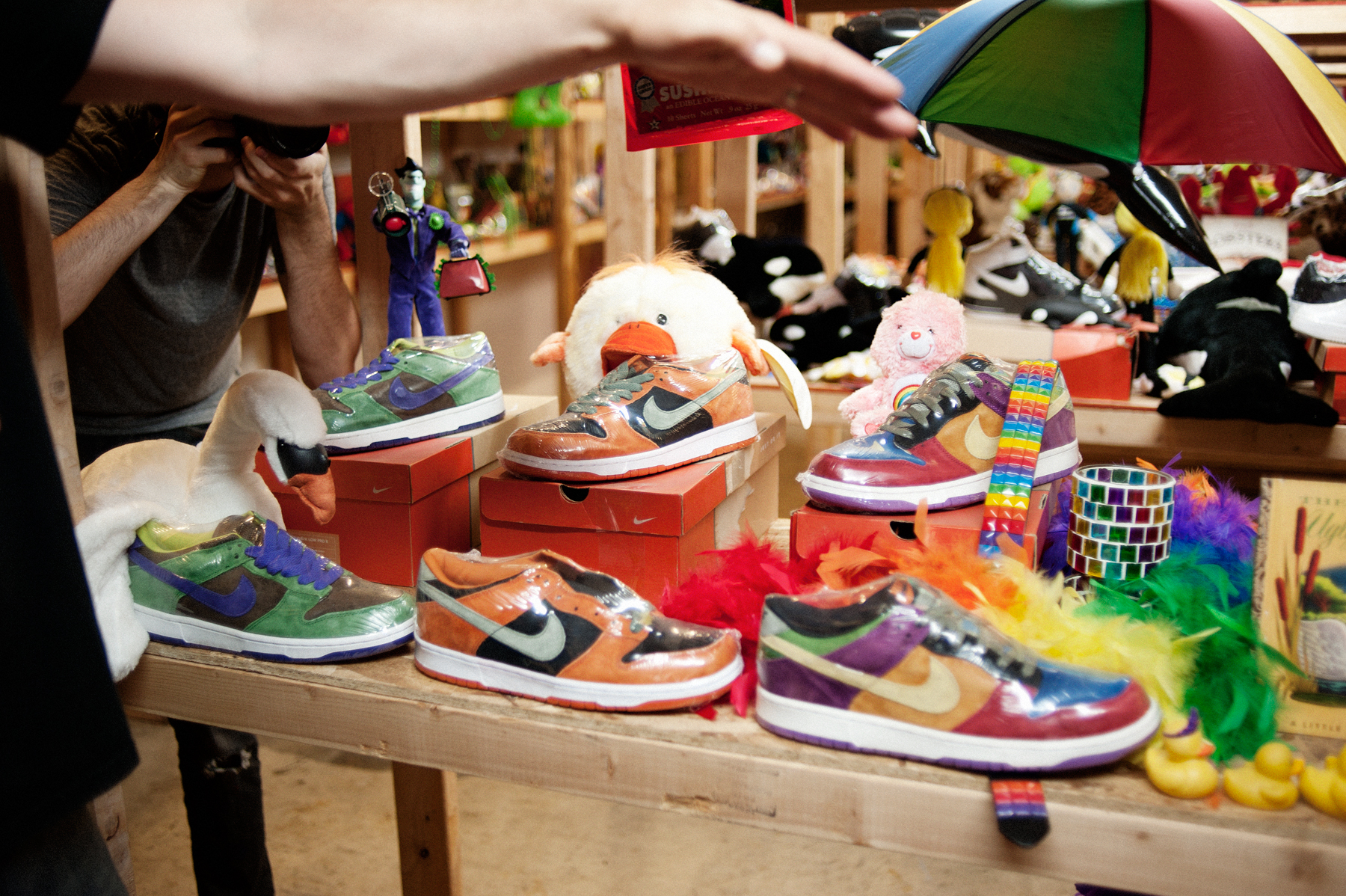
Colorful Nike SBs with accompanying toys

=== Nike "Moon Shoes" ===
==== Bowerman buried Moon Shoe ====
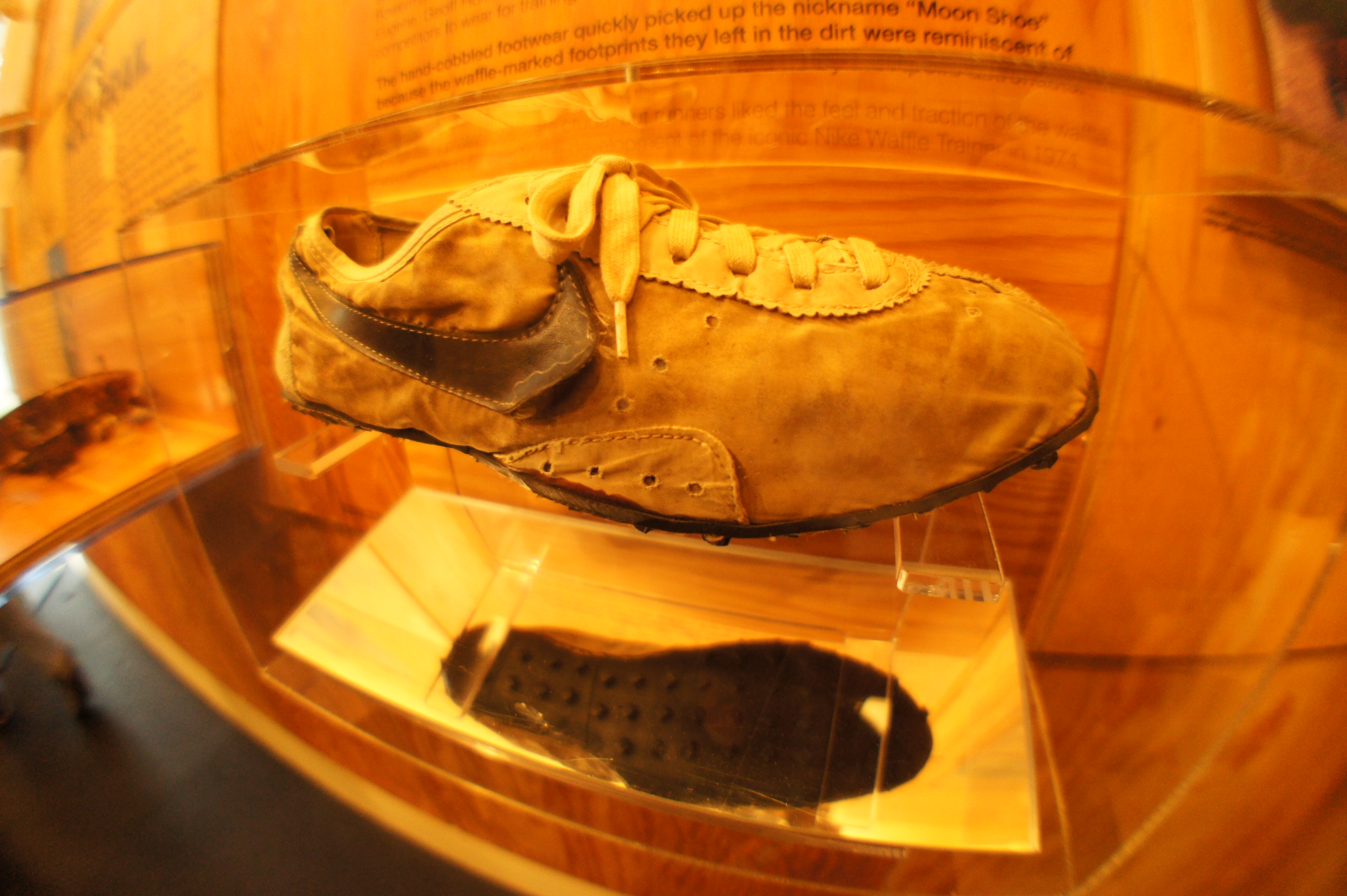
A Nike "Moon Shoe," designed by Bill Bowerman, with its signature waffle sole.

In 2014, Jeff Wasson, a utilities worker, sold an early prototype shoe that he found in Nike co-founder Bill Bowerman's backyard to Geller for $1,500. (Note: Only a single shoe was found.) The shoe is believed to be a prototype of the Nike Moon Shoe, the first shoe Nike made under their previous name, Blue Ribbon Sports. Wasson frequently visited Bowerman's home for meter readings. After Bowerman died in 1999, Wasson was asked by one of Bowerman's sons to help remove some trees from the property. While the two were working, they uncovered a buried trash pile that contained about a dozen shoes and a waffle iron (which was used to mold the soles of the shoes) in Bowerman's backyard. Bowerman's son allowed Wasson to keep one of the shoes where he stored it in his car for a few years. Wasson sold the shoe to Geller after a neighbor saw Geller featured on Pawn Stars. Geller framed the shoe over his fireplace.

==== Covert's Moon Shoes ====
Geller acquired a pair of Moon Shoes owned by American runner Mark Covert for an undisclosed amount in 2015. Prior to the 1972 Olympic Marathon Trials held in Eugene, Oregon, Covert entered an early Nike store to receive a free T-shirt and was given a pair of the Moon Shoes by Geoff Hollister, Nike's third employee. The shoe featured an innovative "waffle sole," designed by Bowerman, and was reportedly more comfortable than other running shoes at that time. Covert was one of five runners to wear the Moon Shoe at the start of his race, but the only one to finish—giving him the distinction of being "the first runner to ever cross a finish line in a pair of Nikes." Covert's shoes became highly collectible over the years, and he was finally convinced by Geller to sell them. Nike had also approached Covert to purchase the shoes but purportedly offered him a lower price than Geller. Geller revealed the shoes at an event at the Oregon Historical Society in 2016.

==== Mortenson's Moon Shoes ====
Geller auctioned off a pair of Moon Shoes belonging to retired runner Bruce Mortenson for $11,200 in 2016. Mortenson acquired the shoes during the 1972 Olympic Trials. Mortenson did not qualify for the team but kept the shoes and wore them in future races. Mortenson decided to sell his shoes after hearing how fellow runner Mark Covert sold his Moon Shoes to Geller. The shoes contained no laces, and the soles were crumbled. According to Geller, the winner of the auction was an avid sneaker collector based in Malaysia.

==== Russell's Moon Shoes ====
Similar to Mortenson, Dave Russell, a runner from Sacramento, was present at the 1972 Olympic Trials, where he was also given a pair of Moon Shoes. Russell did not wear the Moon Shoes during his marathon run, and his shoes were in considerably better condition than Mortenson's, said Geller. Initially, Geller was supposed to facilitate a 10-day eBay auction for Russell's shoes. However, a Nike-themed hotel located in Eugene, Oregon, contacted Russell to purchase his shoes privately. Geller drove to Eugene in a DeLorean to personally deliver the shoes to the hotel where they were to be displayed. The hotel paid $50,000 for Russell's shoes.

==== Sotheby's Moon Shoes ====
In 2019, Geller broke a world record for the most expensive sneaker sold at auction when he sold a pair of 1972 Moon Shoes at Sotheby's for $437,500. Sotheby's had joined with sneaker resale company Stadium Goods to auction off 100 pairs of rare sneakers. Out of the twelve Moon Shoes in existence, Geller had the only known pair that have never been worn. The shoes were expected to sell for $160,000. Miles Nadal, a Canadian investor and car collector, purchased the 99 other sneakers in the lot for $850,000. On the final day of the auction, Nadal won the bid for the Moon Shoes at a record-breaking $437,500. Nadal plans to display the shoes at his private car museum in Toronto.

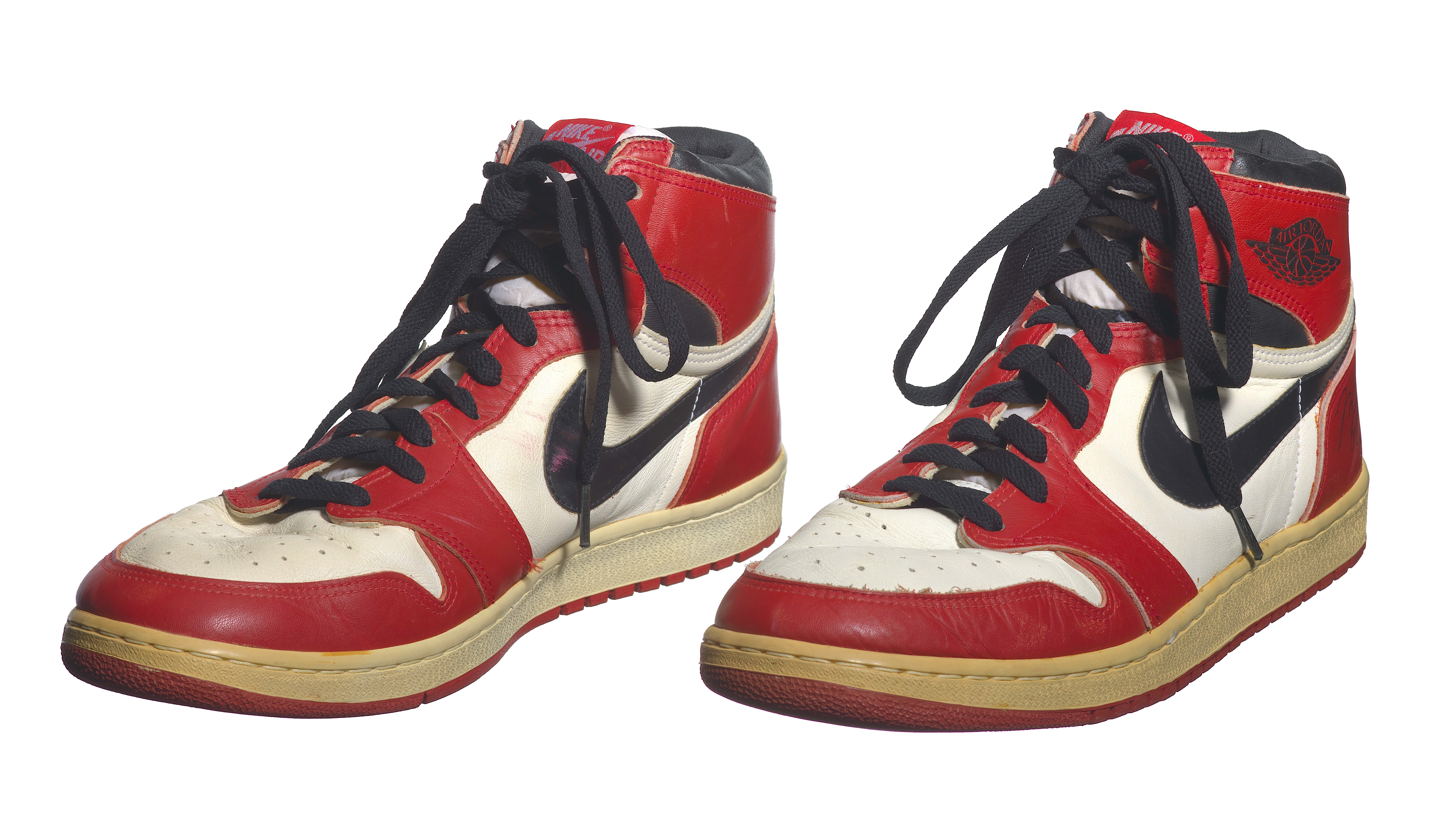
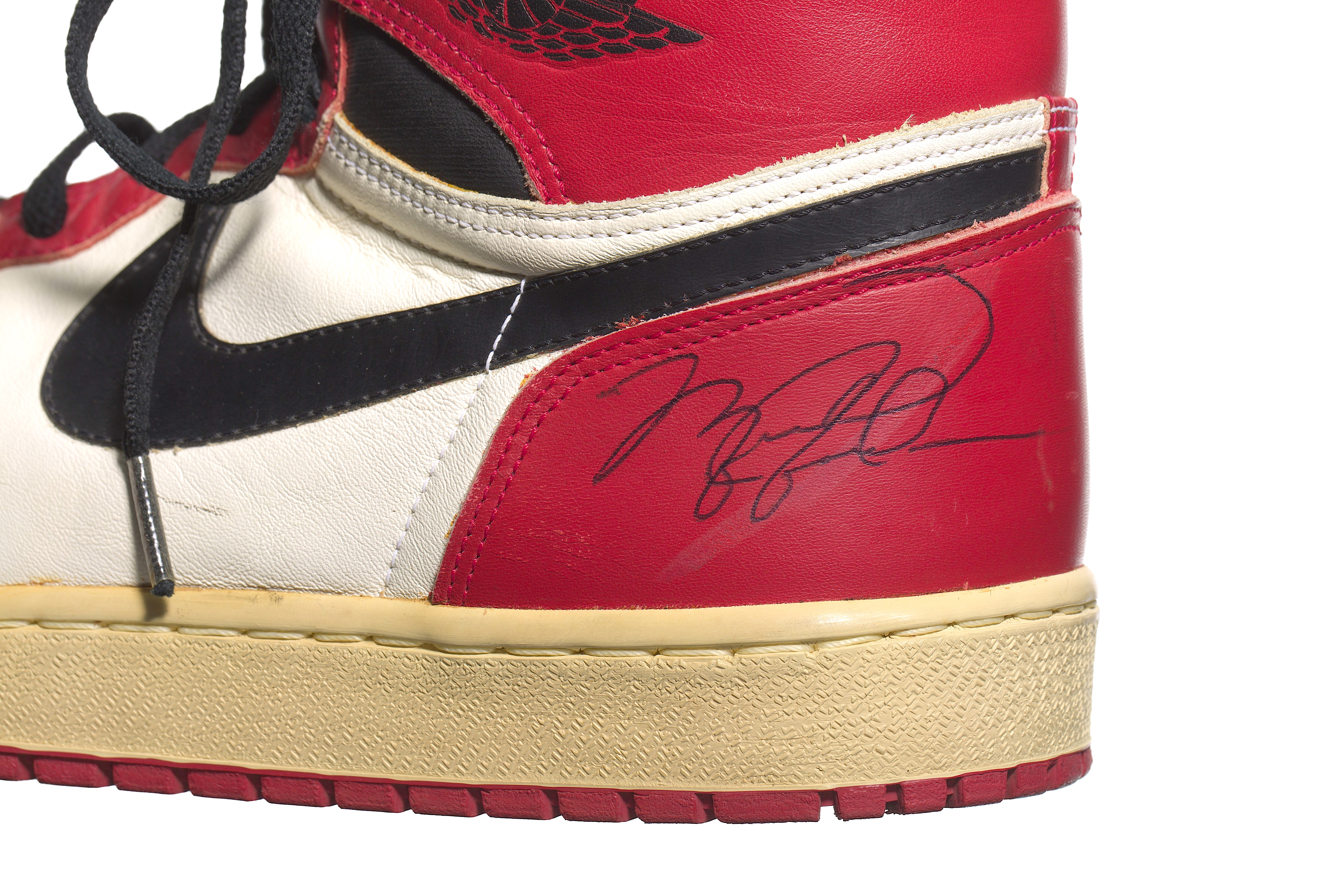
Game-worn and autographed 1985 Air Jordan 1s.

=== Air Jordan 1s ===
On May 17, 2020, Geller broke his own record when his autographed, game-worn 1985 Air Jordan 1s sold at Sotheby's for $560,000. The shoes were in the Chicago Bulls colors of red, white, and black. Like most of Jordan's shoes, the sneakers were mismatched: the left pair was a U.S size 13 while the right pair was a size 13.5. Geller acquired the sneakers in 2012 via an eBay auction, and referred to them as the "crown jewel" of the ShoeZeum. Ten bidders across four continents participated in the 10-day auction. The sale of the shoes coincided with the release of the ESPN documentary The Last Dance, which chronicled how the Chicago Bulls secured their sixth NBA championship during the 1997-1998 season. The shoes sold for nearly four times their initial estimate. Sotheby's did not release the identity of the buyer.

=== Other auctions ===
In 2009, Geller purchased the late DJ AM's personal pair of Air Force 1s for over $3,000 at auction, with the money benefiting the DJ AM Memorial Fund.

In July 2018, Geller sold an original Nike Air Mag, designed for the 1989 film Back to the Future Part II, for $92,100 at auction. The shoe was in poor condition: the plastic outsole was separating, and the shoe's midsole was crumbling. The shoe was too fragile to ship, so the winner of the auction had to travel to Portland to pick them up. The raised money was donated to The Michael J. Fox Foundation.

A former Nike employee of more than 30 years collaborated with Geller to auction off their collection of rare sneakers. The employee, who remains anonymous, worked in Nike's "Innovation Kitchen," where many of Nike's prototype shoes are designed. The auction featured multiple shoes that were never released to the public. According to the Robb Report, the most desired sneakers were a pair of black and gold Air Force 1s made with Nike Shox technology.

Geller and auction house Sotheby's launched a new online marketplace called "The Sneakers Shop" in October 2020. The Sneakers Shop consists of rare game-worn and autographed shoes from Geller's collection, including a Nike Air Max 1 signed by Tinker Hatfield, a pair of Reebok Pumps signed by Shaquille O'Neal, and a pair of Michael Jordan's game-worn and autographed Air Jordan 7s.

In November 2020, eBay hosted an auction where 60 pairs of Geller's Air Jordans would be made available every day for ten days straight. Each shoe in the 30-year-old collection was brand new and had its original box.

== Selling collection ==
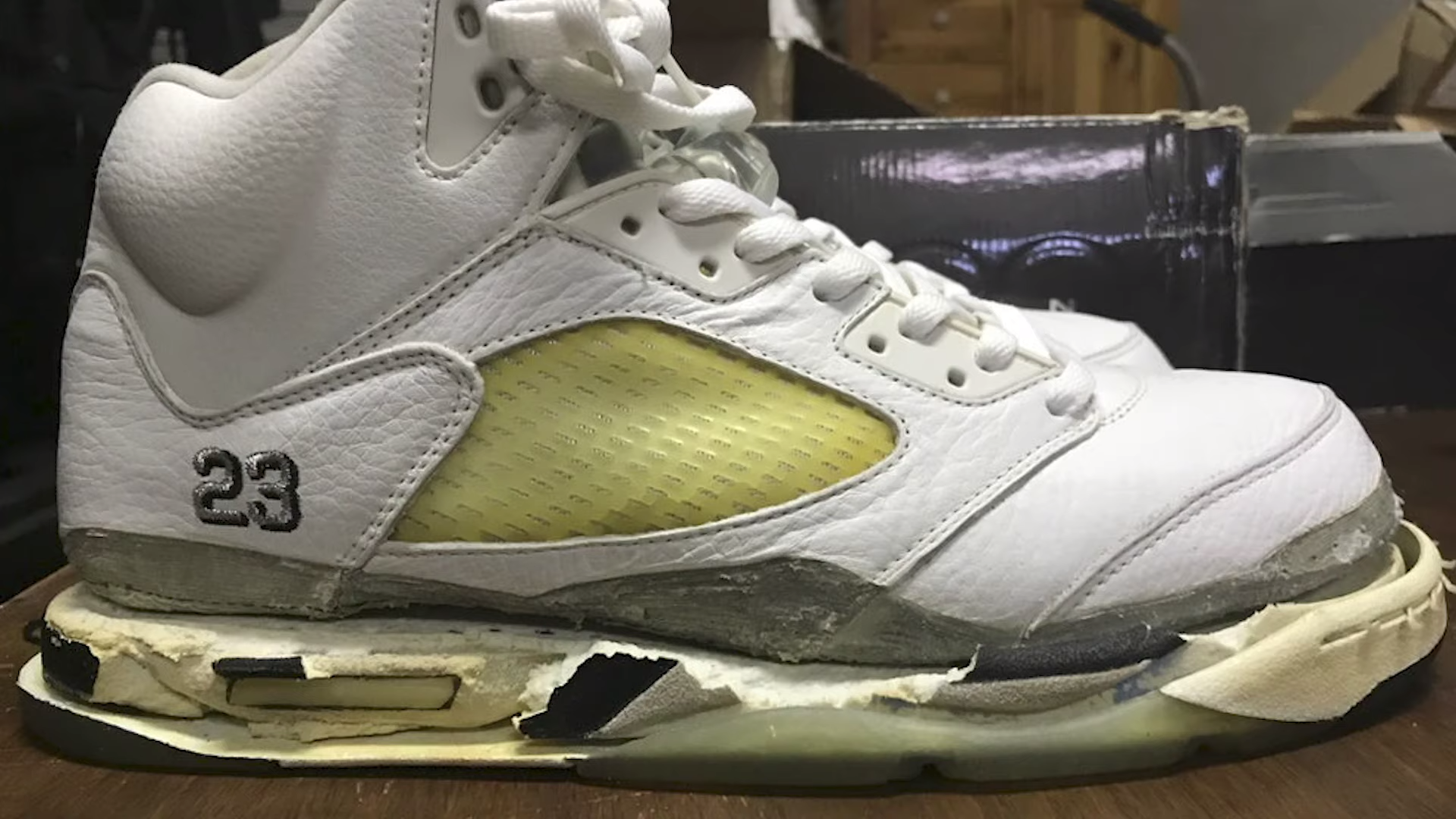
A deteriorating Air Jordan with a crumbling sole

Geller had slowly started selling off his sneaker collection after closing the ShoeZeum in 2012. In a 2014 YouTube video, Geller explained that part of the reason he was selling his shoes was due to the poor shelf life of the polyurethane, a squishy material commonly inserted between the upper and lower soles of sneakers. The degradation of the polyurethane caused some of Geller's sneakers to yellow, and others were completely falling apart. Geller was also frustrated that Nike kept "retroing" (i.e., re-releasing) classic sneaker models.

After moving to Portland in 2015, The Oregonian reported that Geller had 350 remaining pairs of sneakers, and he planned to sell 250 of them in the upcoming holiday season. In a 2016 profile with Willamette Week, Geller stated he was "obsessed" with shoe buying to the point where everything "reminded [him] of an exhibit or a shoe" and that it was "time to move on." The paper reported that Geller had stopped collecting, and he stored his last 200–300 remaining pairs of sneakers in his wife's parents' home, a storage unit, and a safe deposit box. In 2019, Geller told Yahoo! that he will "never stop collecting." Geller's record for the largest sneaker collection has allegedly been broken by three sisters from South Florida who have amassed over 6,000 pairs.

== Personal life ==
Geller met his wife, Natalie, at sneaker retailer Zappos. Geller commented that "[s]hoes are something that are deeply embedded in our relationship." Nike designer Tinker Hatfield gifted Geller a custom pair of Air Jordan 11s for his wedding, which took place on 11/11. Geller has donated to the Doernbecher Children's Hospital in Portland, which has an ongoing partnership with Nike.

== See also ==
- Bata Shoe Museum
- Benjamin Kapelushnik – American entrepreneur and sneaker reseller
- Just for Kicks (2005 film)
- William Habraken – Dutch shoe collector
