= Sneaker collecting =

Hobby of acquisition and trading sneakers

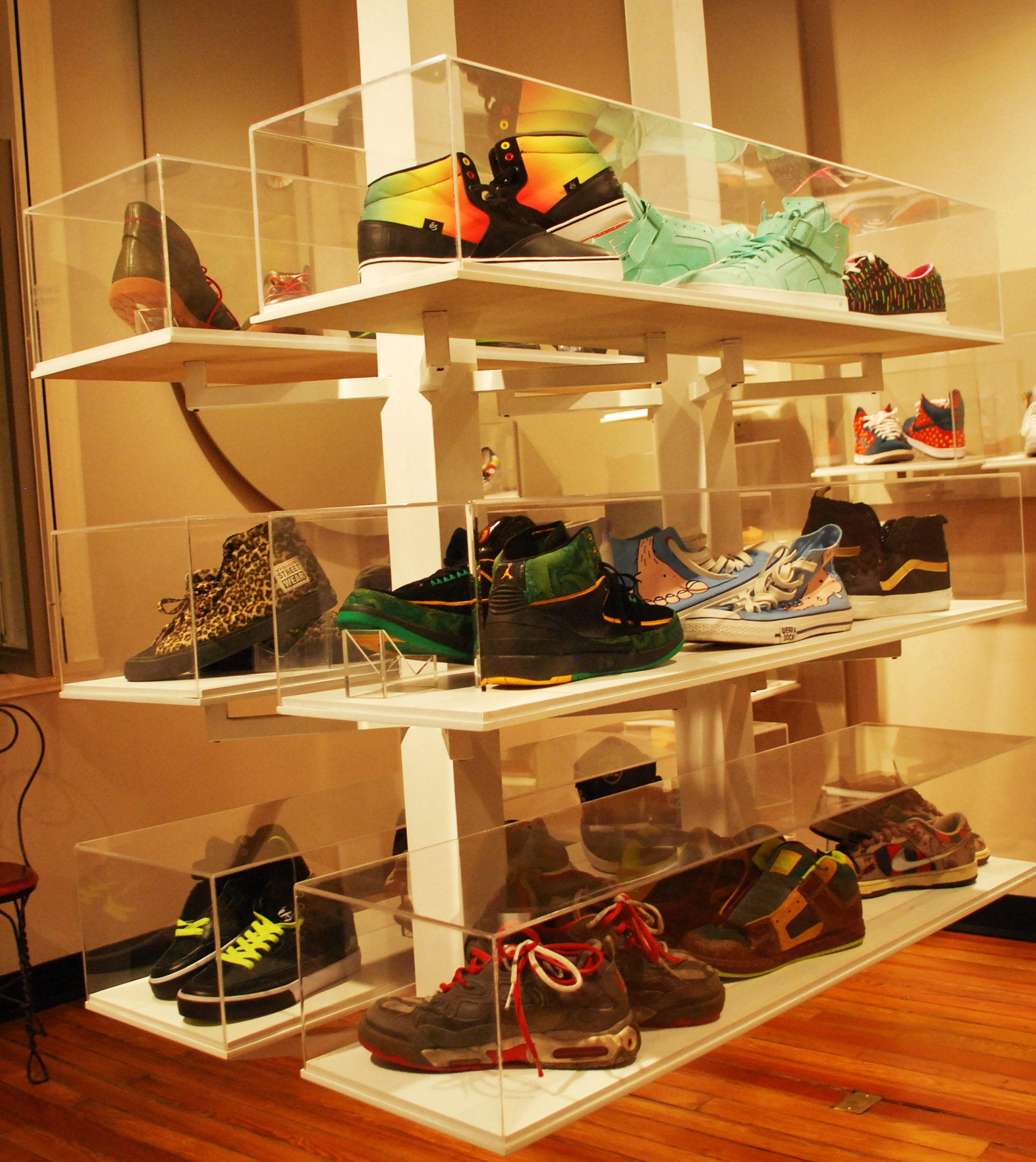
Part of the sneaker collection of Edgar Cortez as shown in the Museo del Objeto del Objeto in Mexico City.

Sneaker collecting is the acquisition and trading of sneakers as a hobby. It is often manifested by the use and collection of shoes made for particular sports, particularly basketball and skateboarding. A person involved in sneaker collecting is sometimes called a sneakerhead.

Sneaker collecting came to prominence in the 1980s in New York City and can be attributed to two major sources: basketball, specifically the emergence of Michael Jordan and his eponymous Air Jordan line of shoes released in 1985, and the growth of hip hop music. The boom of signature basketball shoes during this era provided the sheer variety necessary for a collecting subculture, while the hip-hop movement gave the sneakers their street credibility as status symbols. Sneakerhead culture has extended beyond shoes designed for particular sports, and overlaps with streetwear trends and styles. By one estimate, the sneaker resale market was worth US$10 billion in 2021.

== History ==
Consumers started to collect, trade and resell sneakers in the 1970s, and the sneakerhead subculture came to prominence in New York City during the 1980s. Sneakers such as the Adidas Superstar and Puma Suede were popularized by b-boys and hip-hop artists, and Nike's Air Jordan line revolutionized the industry with its marketing linked to superstar basketball player Michael Jordan.

During the 1960s and 1970s, street basketball was widely played in the streets of the Bronx. One of the important rituals among the players was "stepsies", which was a game for everyone to step on a player's new sneakers. A clean pair of sneakers indicated that the player was weak. However, with the rise of hip hop music, a "clean and fresh" look gained popularity and the game of "stepsies" lost favor. Since the 1970s, there has been a strict rule against combining rival brands. For example, a person wearing Nike sneakers with Adidas track pants would be considered as someone going against the culture. This type of violation lowers a person's reputation and shows their lack of awareness of the culture, similar to forgetting to remove the tag from a designer suit. This practice led sneakerheads to favor one brand over another, resulting in strong brand loyalty. Although the concept of brand exclusively has diminished, the art of mixing brands properly has evolved as streetwear, luxury fashion, and sportswear became significant aspects of sneaker culture.

Sneaker culture became global by the end of the 1990s. Originally popular among urban black youth and white skateboarders, by the 21st century it had gained a sizable Asian following. Sneakers have had cult followings in Japan since the 1990s, where many American fashion brands remain highly covetable. Outside the US, Japan is one of the only markets where limited-edition styles (particularly Nikes) have had region-exclusive releases.

== Culture ==
Sneaker collectors buy online and go to outlets, sneaker events, swapmeets, parties, and gatherings in search of rare, vintage, and limited edition shoes. New launches of popular sneaker models increasingly take place via online raffles through mobile apps. Collectible sneakers can usually be resold for well above their original retail price, including certain collaborations with various athletes and celebrities. Popular fashion trends in sneaker culture usually overlap with streetwear trends and styles.

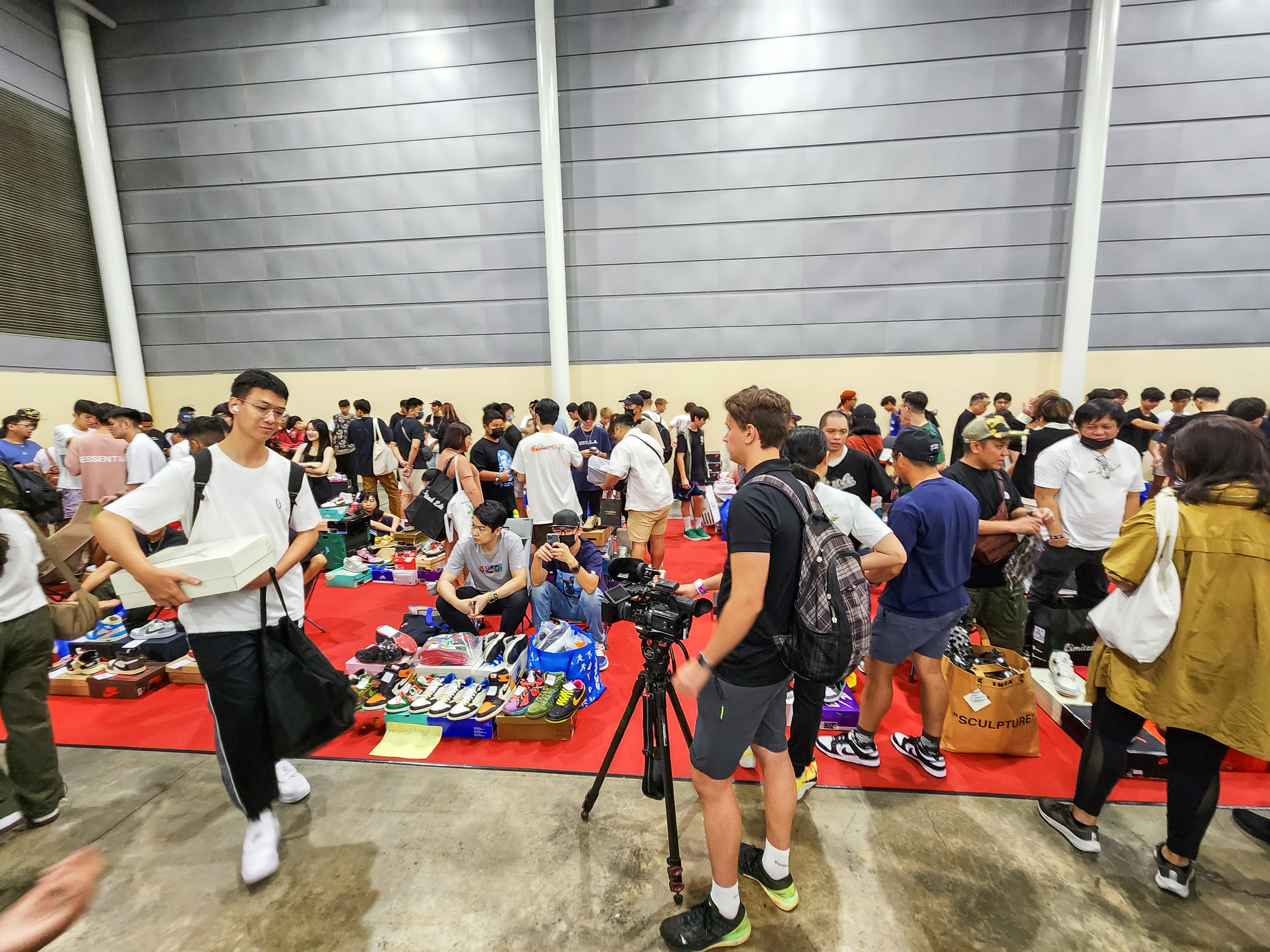
Sneakercon SEA/Singapore 2023 trading pit.

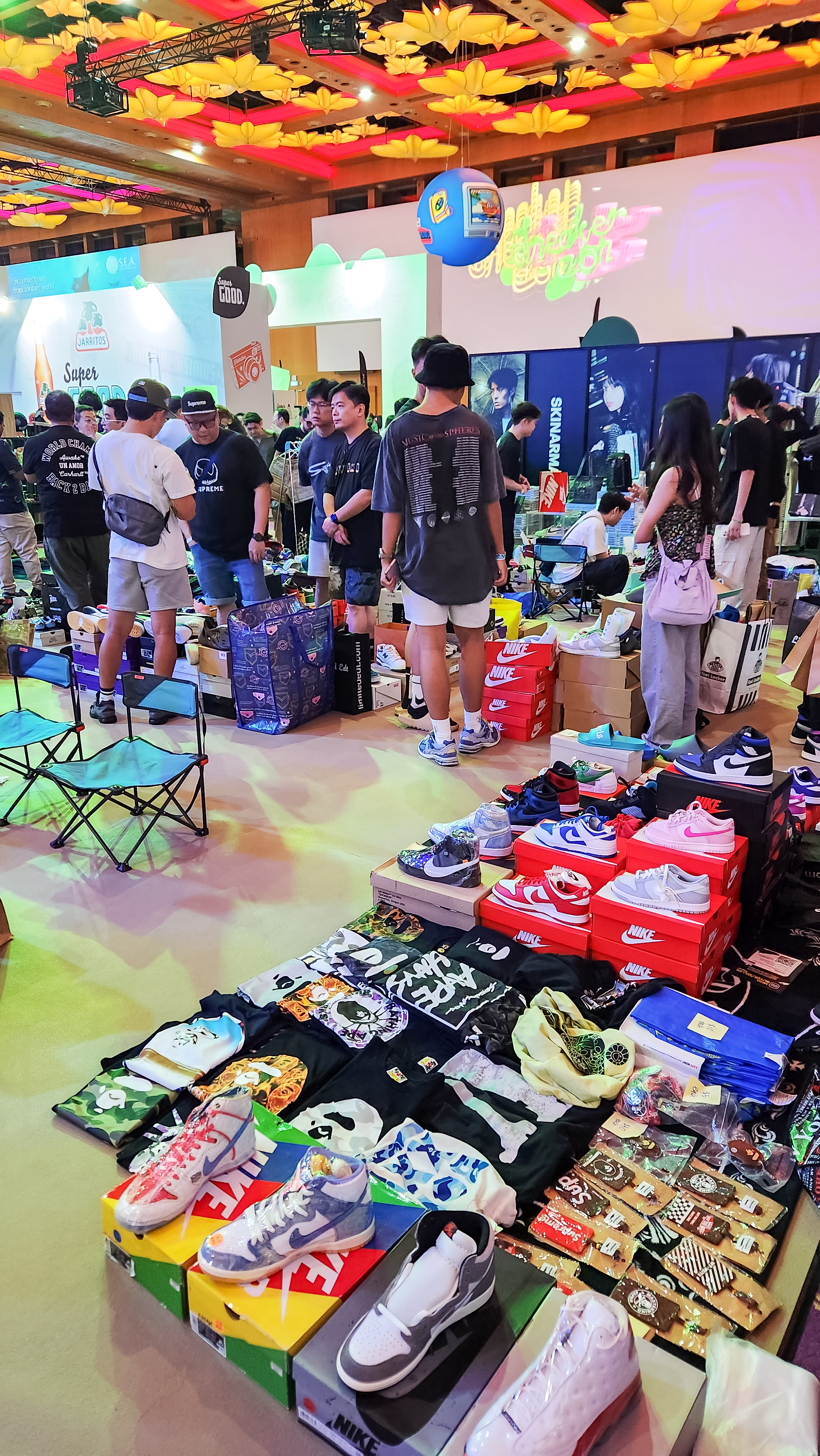
Sneakercon SEA/Singapore 2024 trading pit.

Sneakerheads often participate in both online and offline activities to show their enthusiasm in sneakers. Typical example of offline activity is participating in sneaker exhibitions. Some of the notable exhibitions include Sneakercon in North America and Southeast Asia, Sneakerness in Europe, and Faces&Laces in Russia. Through these exhibitions, sneakerheads show their collections, sell or exchange sneakers, and attend public talks with designers and collectors. Typical example of online activity is making unboxing videos or video reviews of new sneakers where sneakerheads share their ideas and thoughts on the sneakers.

Sneakerheads are also involved in variety of sneaker art, such as sneaker photography and customization often when sneaker consumption is not enough for them. Examples of sneaker art include making paintings and drawings of different models of sneakers and creating comics or cartoons of important sneaker collectors or enthusiasts. Another type of sneaker art is customizing by painting or embroidering them, replacing parts with different materials, or combining parts of different models to create a completely new pair. Many sneakerheads highlight the importance of practicing non-commercial, community based activities like customization, to express their creativity and show their values and enthusiasm in sneakers.

=== Values ===
One popular motive behind collecting sneakers is based on what people watched and who they looked up to as a child. Athletes and superstars are people who have a significant impact on individuals and the shoes they purchase. Growing up in the 1980s when Air Jordans were first released, children idolized basketball players who were wearing the latest styles.

Mainly due to the media, there has been a great deal of traction around the sneaker collecting culture. Articles, TV shows, radios, etc. are all forms of media that has brought attention to the world of sneakers. Through these outlets, children were able to see and listen to their favorite athletes wearing the latest shoe styles. At a young age when sneakers first gained popularity, the issue was that these shoes were either unattainable because of popularity or due to the aftermarket price tag that parents were unwilling to pay for. The sneakers individuals see their favorite celebrities wearing from an early age is one of the reasons why the shoes they buy create such a sentimental feeling. Sneakers that were once desirable yet unattainable from a young age can be afforded later in life. The feeling of acquiring a pair of shoes desired since childhood is what makes sneaker collecting special and nostalgic.

=== Regional ===
Basketball sneakers, such as the Air Jordan 1, were adopted by California skateboarders in the 1980s for their affordability and support. The casuals of Britain used different Adidas styles to reflect their coded rivalries. The cholo subculture is known for its customized Converse All Stars.

Sneakers in South Africa, known as "takkies", have become status symbols. They grew into a "bubblehead" subculture that favors Nike bubble-soled trainers, such as the Nike Air Max line. In the mid-1990s the line, particularly the Air Max 95, experienced such a surge of popularity in Japan that it led to a phenomenon known as "Air Max hunting". The extremely inflated prices of the shoes led to a rash of muggings in the normally-peaceful country wherein Air Max wearers were attacked and their shoes were stolen. Even used shoes were in demand, and fakes also became a problem.

=== Slang ===
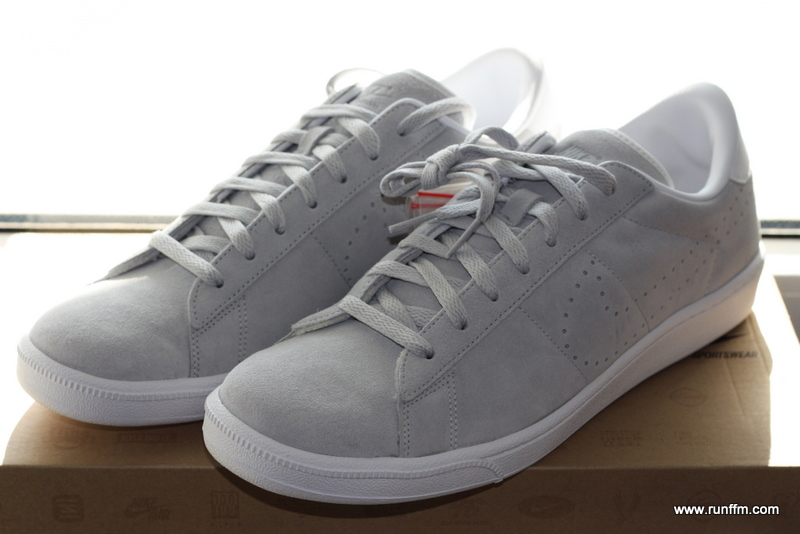
A pair of grey "tonal" Nike low top sneakers

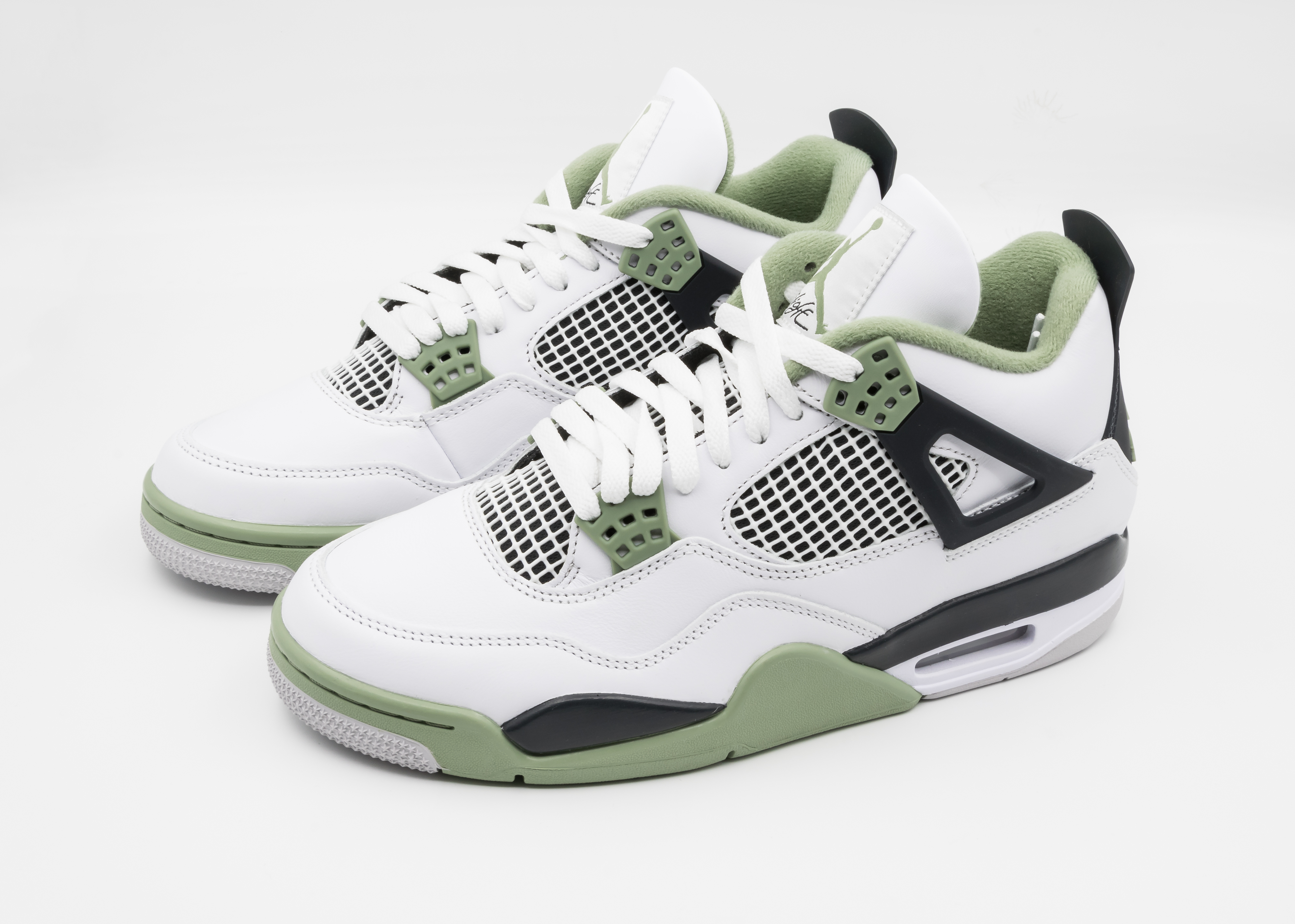
Nike Air Jordan 4 Seafoam shoes

Sneakerheads influenced by hip hop fashion and skater subculture began to develop their own jargon. Commonly used words include:

- "ACG" – All Conditions Gear, a brand of sneakers produced by Nike
- "Beaters" – Sneakers worn despite creases, scuffs, stains, and smell
- "Bots" – Custom-written computer programs designed to cop sneakers in mass quantities, with varying degrees of success; much like the sneakers they are used to purchase, the most desirable bots are sold in limited quantities and frequently resold via online forums such as Discord for well above their original purchase price
- "Bred" – Black and red sneakers; if in reference to the original black-and-red Air Jordan 1 design, "banned" is used as a preferred synonym
- "B-grade" – Shop-worn seconds sold at a discount
- "BK" - British Knights sneakers.
- "Chucks" – Converse All-Stars, though the "Chuck" nickname has been used to describe them since at least the 1950s (e.g. Chuck Taylor All-Stars), in reference to their original designer, Chuck Taylor
- "Clearout" – Selling many pieces of a collection to make room for others
- "Colorway" – The combination of colors or symbols on a pair of sneakers
- "Cop" (used as a verb) – To purchase or acquire
- "Deadstock" – A pair of sneakers that has never been worn, tried on or re-laced.
- "Deubré" – Also called lace tags, popular on shoes like Air Force Ones
- "Don't sleep" – Used literally relative to sneaker releases, e.g. collectible Nikes that are most often released at 7:00 am West Coast time in the US, when many sneakerheads would normally be asleep; informally used as a synonym for "don't forget"
- "Dope" – Fashionable
- "Double up" – Buying two identical pairs of sneakers
- "Drop" – Release of a new sneaker
- "Fire" – Very good
- "Flop" – Poorly sold
- "Fresh" – New and cool
- "Fugazi" – Fake
- "GOAT" – Greatest Of All Time (most commonly a reference to Michael Jordan, in sneakerhead terminology, or the reseller store of the same name)
- "GR" – General release, or common
- "Grail" – Sneakers subjectively wanted most by a collector, as in holy grail.
- "GS" – Grade school, sneakers appropriate for children
- "Gum sole" – Sneakers with solid rubber soles in their original light beige color
- "Gutties" – Scottish slang term for trainers/sneakers.
- "Heat" – Rare sneakers that draw looks
- "High top(s)" – A shoe that rises above or on the ankle mainly used for ankle support during sports.
- "Hypebeast" – Trendies who only buy the latest release. Hypebeasts buy whatever the celebrities are wearing and tend to copy people like hip-hop artist Kanye West. By 2020, hypebeast became a derogatory term in many countries for a hipster whose style had begun branching out into designer streetwear.
- "Js" – Another name for Air Jordan shoes
- "JB" – Jordan Brand
- "Jumpman" – Basketball player Michael Jordan, but in sneakerhead culture more commonly used to describe the Jumpman logo depicting Jordan created by Nike designer Tinker Hatfield and first seen on the Air Jordan 3
- "Instacop" – Impulse buying
- "Kicks" – Shoes
- "L" – Loss/unable to purchase
- "LL" – Lightly loved, a pair of sneakers that shows very little use or wear and still in good or better condition
- "Lit up" – Great
- "Lows" – Also called low tops, shoes that sit below the ankle
- "Mids" – Situated between high and low tops
- "NIB" – Unworn, new in the box
- "OG" – Retro re-release of an original design or colorway, derived from the term "original gangster" but generally limited to describing variations of the Air Jordan 1 High
- "Quickstrike (QS)" – Limited edition sneakers and prototypes with a regional early release, especially Nikes
- "Reseller" – A person who buys large quantities of unworn popular sneakers to sell at a profit; also used to describe retail stores, both online and off, that sell collectible models at prices usually well above original retail, including StockX, Stadium Goods, Flight Club and GOAT
- "Red October" – Very rare red sneakers by Nike and rapper Kanye West
- "Retros" – a re-release after a shoe model's debut
- "Silhouette" – Design of a sneaker
- "Sitting" – Referring to sneakers produced in large quantities that go unsold
- "Slept on" – Unappreciated by the wider community
- "SNKRS" – is used as short for sneakers
- "Steezy" – Stylish
- "Takkies" – South African slang for sneakers
- "Threads" – Clothes
- "Tonal" – Sneakers in a single color, as in monotone.
- "Trainers" – British slang for sneakers
- "Unauthorized / unauthorised" – counterfeit
- "VNDS" – Very Near Dead Stock sneakers that have been tried or worn once or twice and that look new while maintaining clean, spotless soles and no marks or signs of wear.
- "Uptowns" – New York slang for Air Force 1s
- "W" – Win/successful purchase
- "Yeezy" – Sneakers designed by rapper Kanye West

== Styles and marketing ==
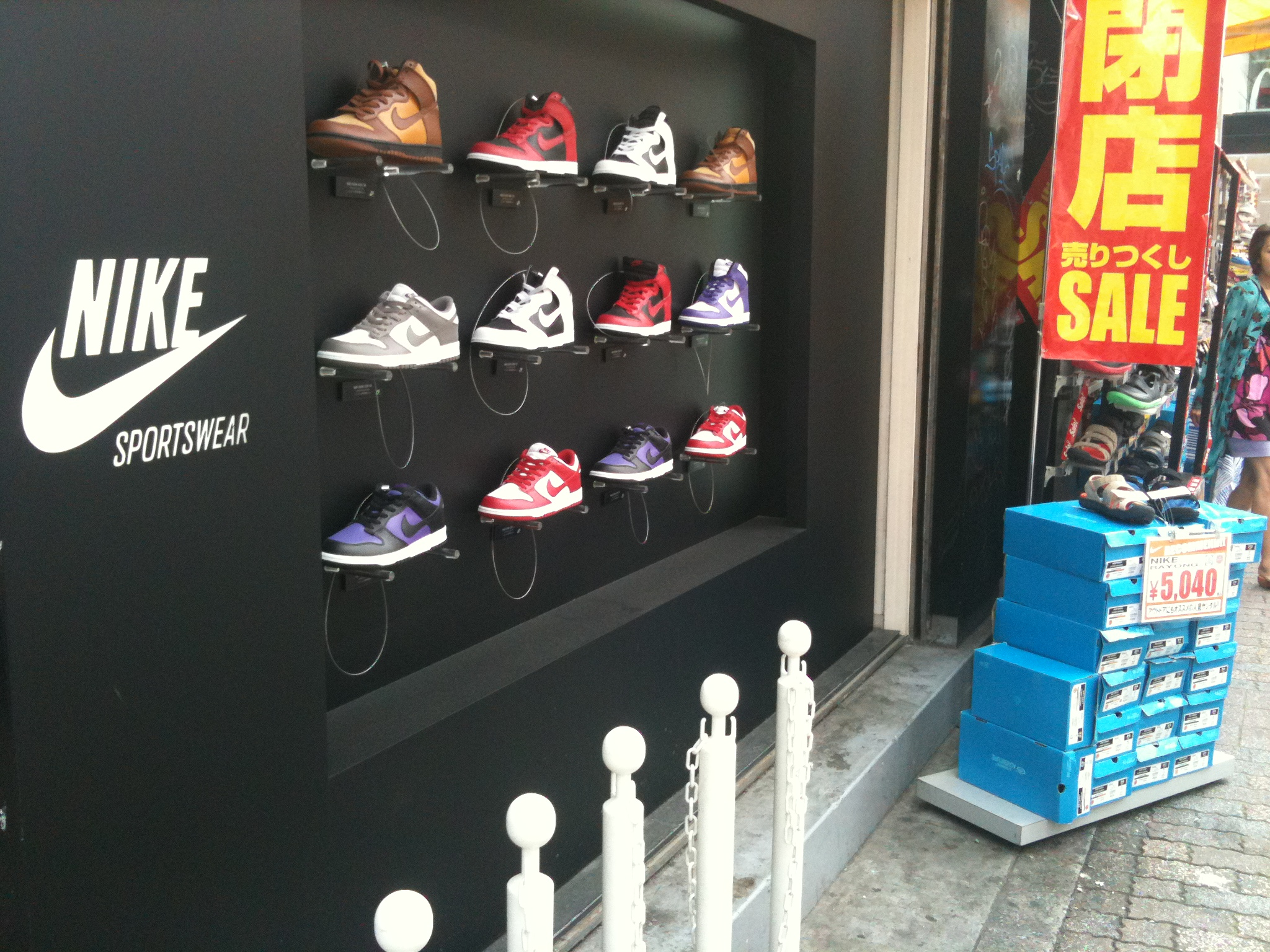
Store display of new release Nike sneakers

Several popular brands and styles of sneakers have emerged as collector's items in the sneakerhead subculture. Popular collections include Air Jordans, Air Force Ones, Nike Dunks, Nike Skateboarding (SB), Nike Foamposites, Nike Air Max, and the Adidas Yeezy line. Shoes that are valued most are often exclusive or limited editions, and certain color schemes may be rarer relative to others in the same sneaker. Several sneaker manufacturers have custom shops where people can choose from the color, lettering, and materials. One-of-a-kind sneakers that have been hand-painted have become popular as well.

Nike continues to use basketball stars to market new sneakers. In 2011, the Zoom Hyperdunk was introduced through Blake Griffin (a Los Angeles Clippers player and NBA 2010–11 NBA Rookie of the Year). Nike has also employed celebrities from outside of the sports world to design and market new shoe lines. One example is the Nike Air Yeezy, designed by rapper Kanye West.

=== Sneaker stores ===
Stores such as Kith, Concepts, Rif LA, Union LA, Undefeated, and more are places where sneaker lovers enjoy spending time. Flight Club was one of the first consignment shops to open in 2005. Sneakerheads have made Flight Club a destination to see some of the most exclusive, rare, and famous sneakers in the world firsthand. Flight Club has been referred to as a museum for sneakers, with multiple sections dedicated to different kinds of sneakers. A full wall holds all of the latest Nike, Jordan, and Yeezy releases, while another section holds some of the rarest and most expensive sneakers with a price tag of upwards of $50,000. The store also holds a section with the entire line of 1985 Jordan 1s, the shoes that helped start the sneaker culture and craze. Flight Club along with many other stores not only serve as a place to buy sneakers, but a place to experience the excellence of sneakers in person that were once only a digital image in their minds.

== Industry growth and reselling ==
Sneakers have some of the highest resale multiples among retail consumer goods. Sneakers are resold for prices that can exceed 10x return on the most coveted, low-production releases. In the 2010s, the sneaker market expanded into online retailing and auction sites. Some retailers have implemented a raffle system for online and in-store sales, while others have implemented a first come, first served model. Nike launched its SNKRS app in 2015 to give better access to its latest sneaker releases. The app implements multiple variations of raffle systems – notably 10-minute-long "draws" – and as of 2020 mostly eschews the first come, first served model. (Nike still sells the vast majority of its products via its separate, non-SNKRS-related app, along with sales through traditional brick-and-mortar sellers such as Foot Locker and large department stores.) Apps like SNKRS were made to give ordinary buyers a fair chance to purchase a given pair, but with mixed results. While Nike has the financial wherewithal to continuously improve the app to prevent internet bots from exploiting it, this is generally not the case with small, independent sneaker boutiques; on many such sites, bots and proxy servers in particular (which "spoof" IP addresses to obfuscate multiple purchase attempts from a single buyer) have made it difficult to purchase popular sneakers via scheduled releases before they sell out. The old-school sneakerhead community routinely expresses distaste for the resale community, especially buyers who only do so for profit, not appreciation for sneakers' history or artistry.

The high value of limited-edition sneakers has given rise to a large-scale counterfeit market. In response to the large counterfeit challenges, new companies have taken off. The shoe reselling market is dominated by StockX and GOAT, and eBay launched its own authenticated-sneaker initiative. These sites provide a trusted platform for sneaker resellers. On both StockX and GOAT, a buyer places an order for a given pair of sneakers, and the seller sends the purchased item(s) to StockX or GOAT facilities for inspection and verification; products are shipped to buyers if they are successfully authenticated. Authentication apps like CheckCheck, Legitmark, and Legit Check App By Ch were created to stop problems with counterfeit shoes. These apps are designed to help other users who lack knowledge in the sneaker community. People pay and send pictures to experts where they are "legit" checked.

While StockX and GOAT have not disclosed how many sellers on their platforms sell goods en masse, they are believed to be the most popular outlets for doing so; StockX sold $1.8 billion in merchandise in 2020 alone (including sportswear and some other lines, but predominantly sneakers). StockX estimated the secondary resale sneaker market to be worth $10 billion in 2021 and to reach nearly $30 billion by 2030.

== See also ==
- Benjamin Kapelushnik (sneaker reseller)
- Just for Kicks (documentary film)
- Sneakerheads (TV series)
- 2010s teenage fashion
- Mars Blackmon (Spike Lee character)
- Josh Luber (Co-founder of StockX)
- Jordan Geller (created the first sneaker museum, ShoeZeum)
- List of shoe styles
