= Benjamin Kapelushnik =

American entrepreneur and sneaker reseller

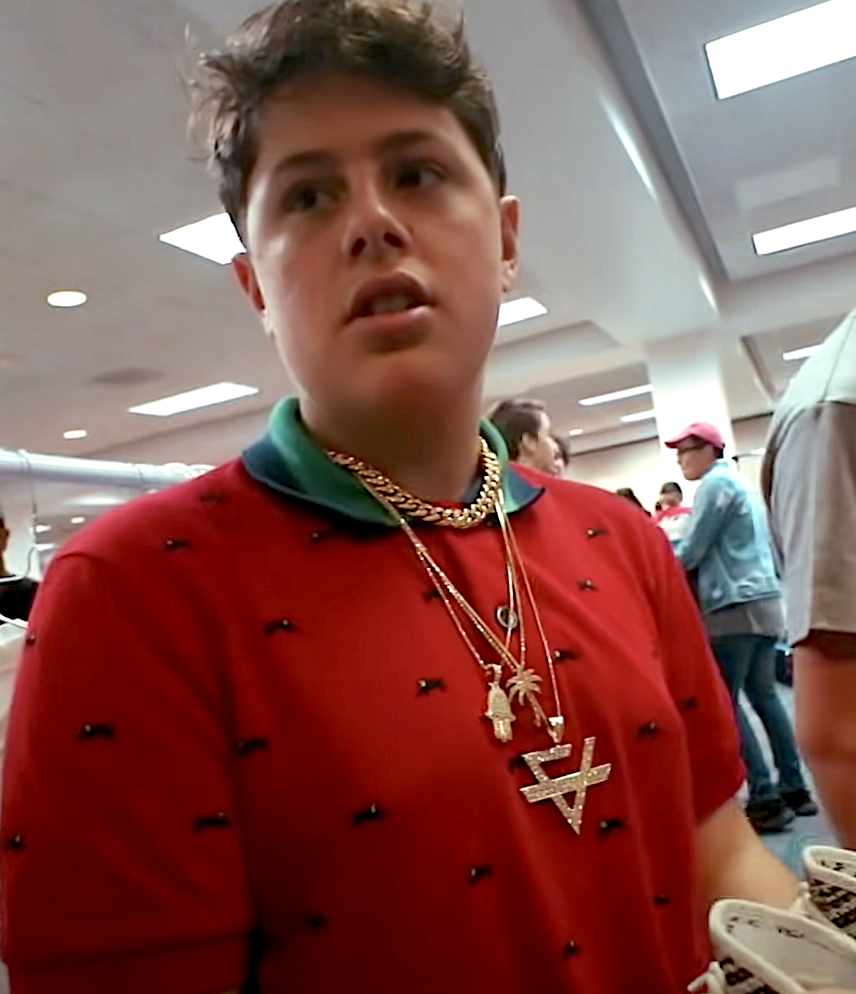
- Kapelushnik authenticating a pair of sneakers in 2017
- Born: October 14, 1999 (age 26); Brooklyn, New York, US
- Other names: Benjamin Kickz; Sneaker Don
- Occupation: Entrepreneur
- Awards: Shorty Awards finalist (2018)

Benjamin Kapelushnik (born October 14, 1999), also known as Benjamin Kickz or the Sneaker Don, is an American entrepreneur and sneaker reseller. At 16-years-old, Kapelushnik amassed nearly US$1 million in sales through his self-made sneaker business and attracted high-profile clients such as DJ Khaled and Odell Beckham Jr. In 2016, Kapelushnik was included in Fortune's "18 Under 18" list and The Guardian's "teen power list."

== Life and career ==
Kapelushnik was born in Brooklyn, New York and grew up in Miami, Florida. He is the son of Russian immigrants. His father is a real-estate broker and his mother is a stay-at-home parent. Kapelushnik has a younger brother who he features on his social media. He keeps kosher. Kapelushnik attended Fort Lauderdale High School but was later homeschooled.

Kapelushnik first gained an interest in sneakers after his mother purchased him a pair of Nikes in middle school. Shortly after, Kapelushnik used some of his bar-mitzvah money to purchase additional sneakers and began consulting sneaker magazines and the sneaker resale market. Using the profit from some of his initial sales and from his parents, Kapelushnik began to buy shoes in bulk, including 85 pairs of Air Jordan 1s. According to Kapelushnik, he managed to find friends with contacts to Nike and Adidas, often referred to as "plugs," and formed a partnership with an out-of-state sneaker store in order to acquire sneakers before their release date.

In 2014, Kapelushnik's reselling business gained momentum when a customer introduced him to record producer DJ Khaled. Kapelushnik began a close relationship with Khaled and is frequently featured on Khaled's Snapchat. After meeting Khaled, Kapelushnik's clientele went on to include a number of prominent rappers, athletes, and celebrities, including Drake, Travis Scott, Floyd Mayweather, Kevin Hart and others. Kapelushnik acknowledged that P. Diddy is his biggest customer. In an interview with New York magazine, Kapelushnik noted that he planned on signing up for a reality TV show and that he desired to open his own brick and mortar stores.

Kapelushnik has been featured on Complex, Great Big Story, Closing Bell, Business Insider, The Daily Show, and CNN. In 2018, Kapelushnik appeared on an episode of Most Expensivest, hosted by rapper 2 Chainz.

Kapelushnik was a finalist for the 10th annual Shorty Awards for the Best in Fashion category.

Kapelushnik is signed with Brillstein Entertainment Partners. In 2020, Kapelushnik released a single titled "Let You Go," featuring Gunna.

On January 7, 2021, Kapelushnik was arrested for strongarm robbery, a second-degree felony, according to the Miami-Dade State Attorney's Office. Prosecutors alleged that on New Year's Eve in the lobby of the Fontainebleau Hotel in Miami Beach, Kapelushnik and his entourage attacked a 19-year-old male for taking of a picture of him, an act which the attacked man denied, without his consent. Prosecutors said that the victim subsequently required hospitalization and surgery. Following the incident, Kapelushnik entered a diversion program for first-time offenders.

A year after the altercation, a member of Kapelushnik's entourage was arrested in connection to the incident in Indianapolis on a fugitive warrant. The man is charged with aggravated battery and strong-arm robbery and is awaiting extradition to Miami-Dade.

== See also ==
- Jordan Geller – American sneaker collector (born 1977)
- Sneaker collecting
- StockX – Online marketplace primarily dealing with sneakers
