= Nike Shox =

Shoe by Nike

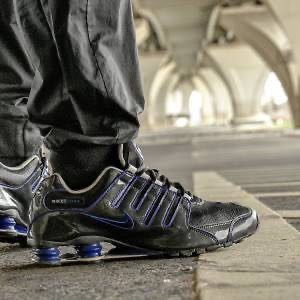
- Close up of a Nike Shox sneaker
- Type: Support system
- Inventor: Nike, Inc.
- Inception: 2000; 26 years ago
- Manufacturer: Nike
- Website: nike.com/shox

Nike Shox is a support system feature in several of Nike's flagship sneakers, first released in 2000. The design is an arrangement of primarily polyurethane hollow columns in the midsole supporting the shoe's heel. Most models include four circular columns in a square formation to provide stability. Later variations sometimes added additional columns, or changed to triangular or rectangular formations.

== History ==
In 1984, designer Bruce Kilgore began researching the Shox project design. Inspiration for the shoe is said to have come from viewing indoor track sprinters who appeared to "bounce" after impacting the surface of the track. Nike developers experimented with many materials that were unable to provide the runner with sufficient support and was only returning a small portion of energy to the runner following impact with the ground. Ultimately, polyurethane was developed as the system's key component.

Shox development began during the 1980s with a mechanical prototype featuring the Nike Internationalist in Exeter, New Hampshire.

Nike released the first Shox shoe in 2000. During the 2000 Summer Olympics, the brand saw a boost in popularity when Team USA's Vince Carter dunked over Team France's 7'2" center Frédéric Weis in a pair of Shox BB4, his first signature shoe with Nike. Carter's dunk would become a major influence on Shox' advertisement strategy.

In 2016, Nike created an Air Force 1 prototype with Shox cushioning, never released to the public. The proficiency testing sample was then sold by an ex-employee during an eBay auction organized in collaboration with the sneaker collector Jordan Geller, owner of Shoezeum and of the record for the biggest sneaker collection of the world. The shoe is now owned by the Swiss startup Support Your Localz, founded by Andrea Antonacci.

On June 29, 2019, Nike commemorated Vince Carter's career by re-releasing his first signature shoe, the Shox BB4, in various colorways, including the "Olympics" variant. Vince Carter sported the shoes in different colorways throughout the 2018–19 NBA season and 2019-20 NBA season. Carter famously wore the model during the 2000 Summer Olympics when he pulled off "le dunk de la mort" ("the Dunk of Death"). The shoe worn by Carter in the 2001 NBA All-Star Game, a white and varsity red colorway, was re-released on October 11, 2019. Several other colorways that Vince wore on-court throughout his final years in the NBA were also released.

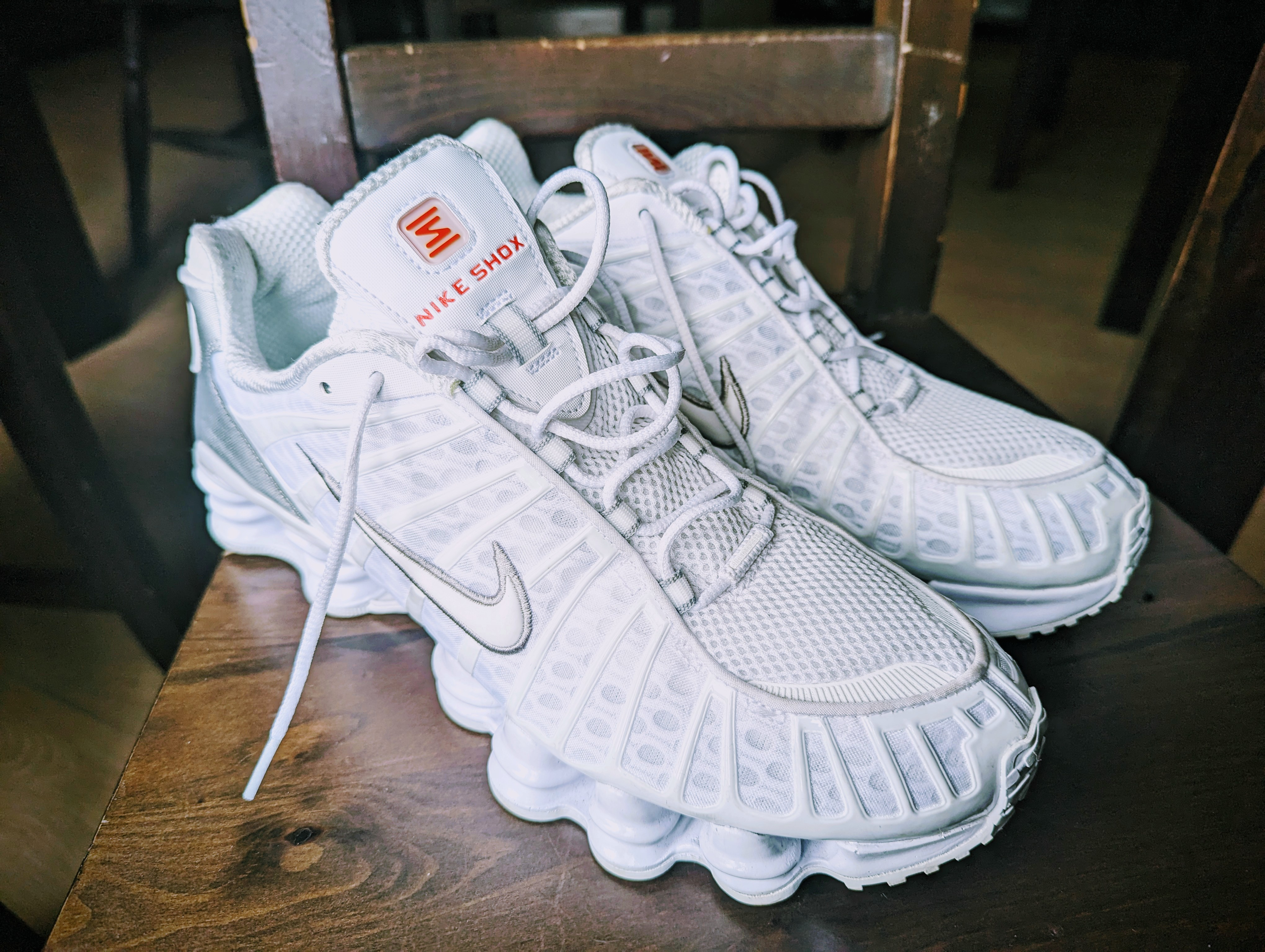
'White Silver' colour Nike Shox shoes

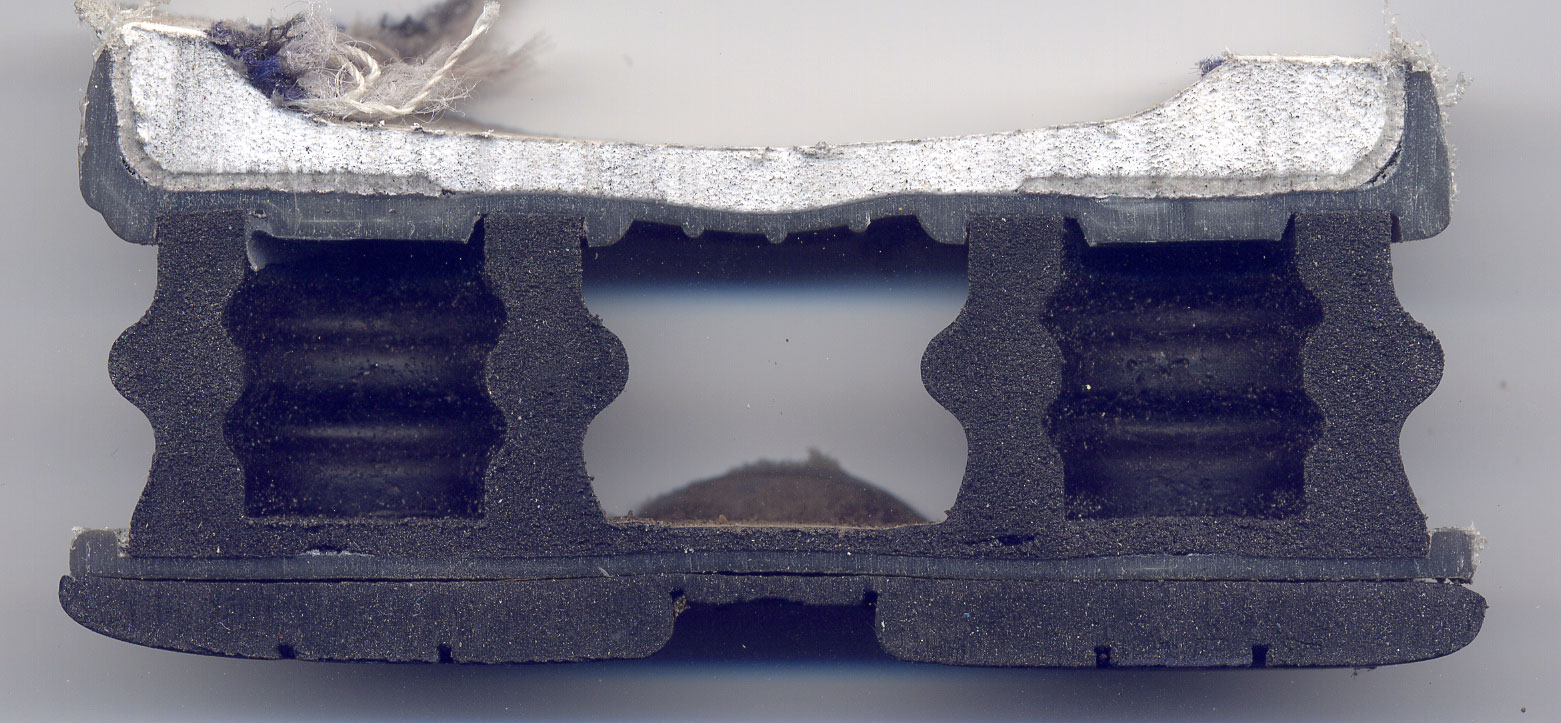
A view of the inside of Nike Shox columns

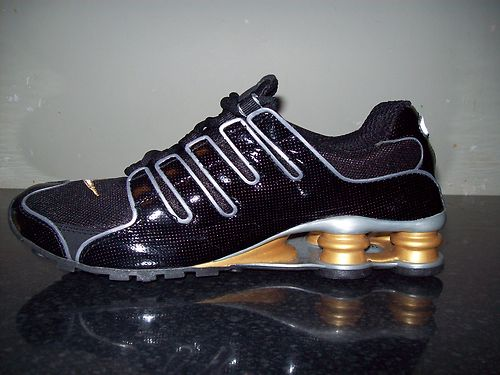
Black and gold Nike Shox

== Design ==
Nike claims that Shox not only absorb impact from heel strike while running, but the company also claims they "spring back" and add more power to a runner's stride. Aside from this alleged boost in speed, the Shox is supposed to provide superior shock absorption with high-tech elastic foam. The newer Shox series is compatible with Nike+ technology.

On February 17, 2006, BBC News reported that Nike had filed a patent infringement suit against rival Adidas, claiming that a range of their trainers replicated its technology.

== In popular culture ==
- Actor Hugh Laurie of Fox's House was known to wear the Nike model repeatedly on and off the set.
- Comedian Jerry Seinfeld is also a fan of, and wears Nike Shox.
- Rapper Kendrick Lamar wore a pair of Shox R4 on stage for The Pop Out: Ken & Friends. The one-off concert marked Lamar's first major performance following his highly publicized feud with rapper Drake.

== See also ==
- Energy Return System, similar system from Reebok
