= Nike Air Force =

Range of athletic shoes made by Nike

Nike Air Force 1
- Original colorway of the Nike Air Force of 1982
- Type: Sneakers
- Inventor: Nike, Inc.
- Inception: 1982; 44 years ago
- Manufacturer: Nike, Inc.
- Website: nike.com/air-force-1

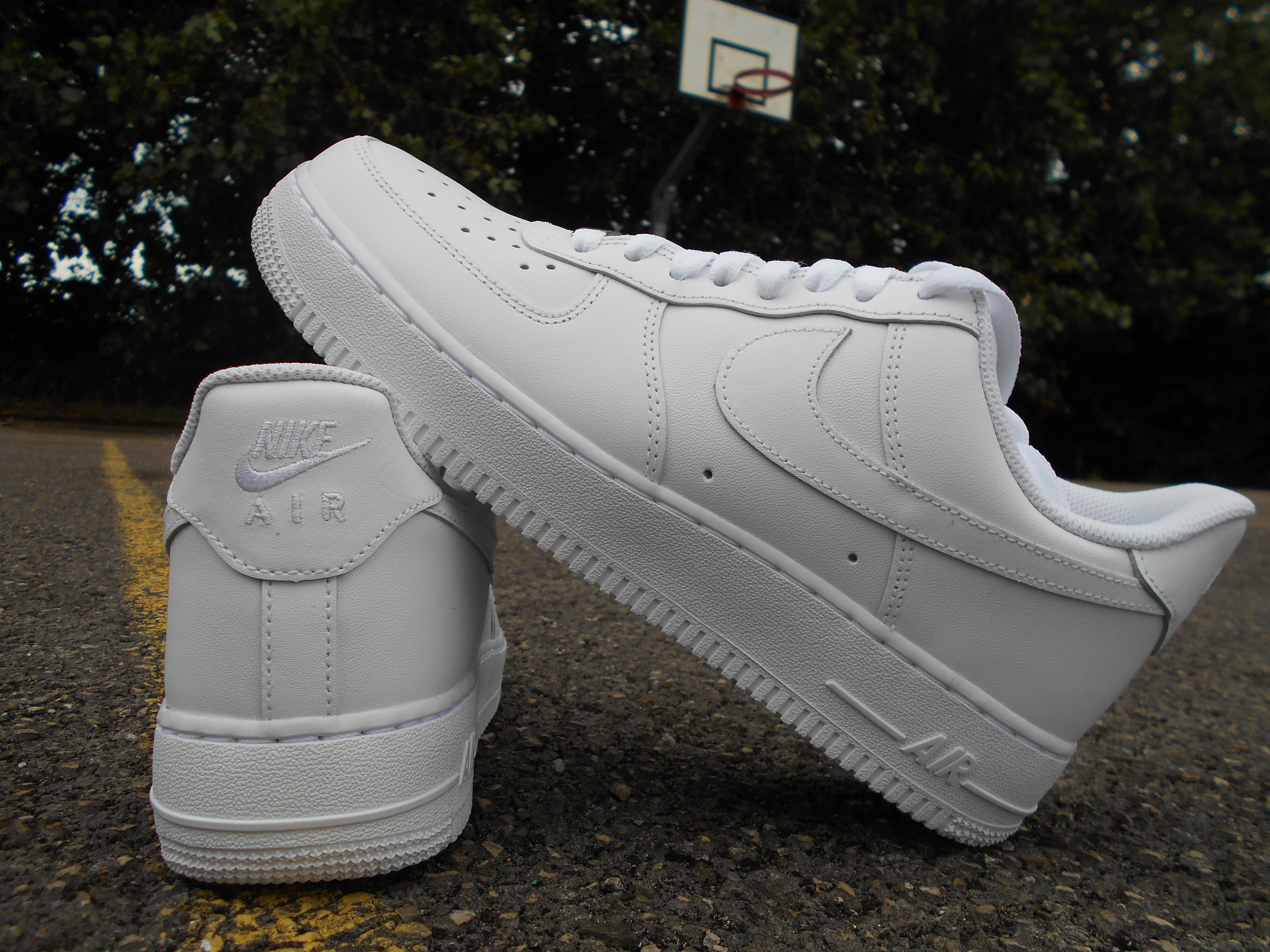
Nike Air Force 1 - Low-Top

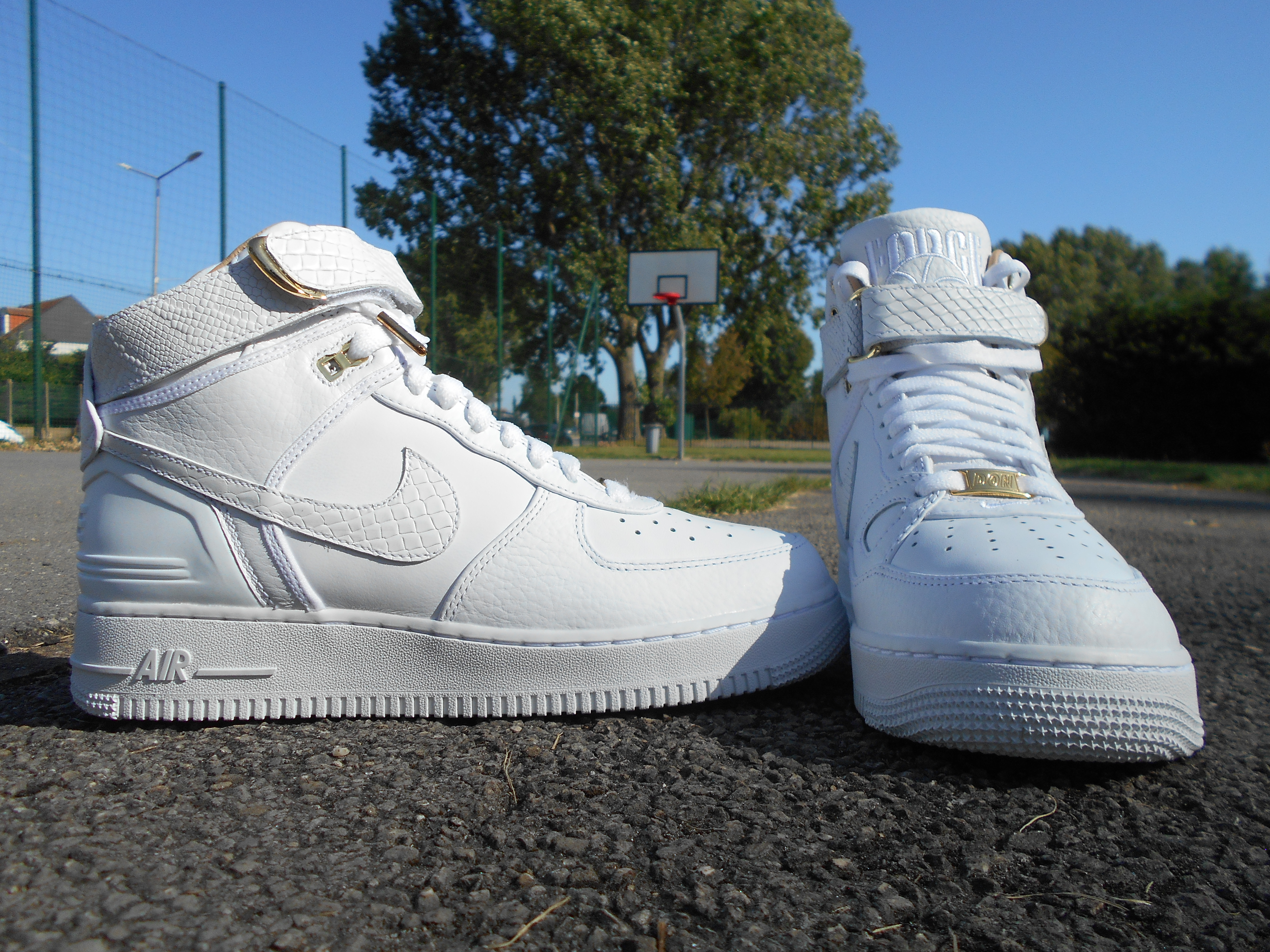
Nike Air Force 1 - High-Top

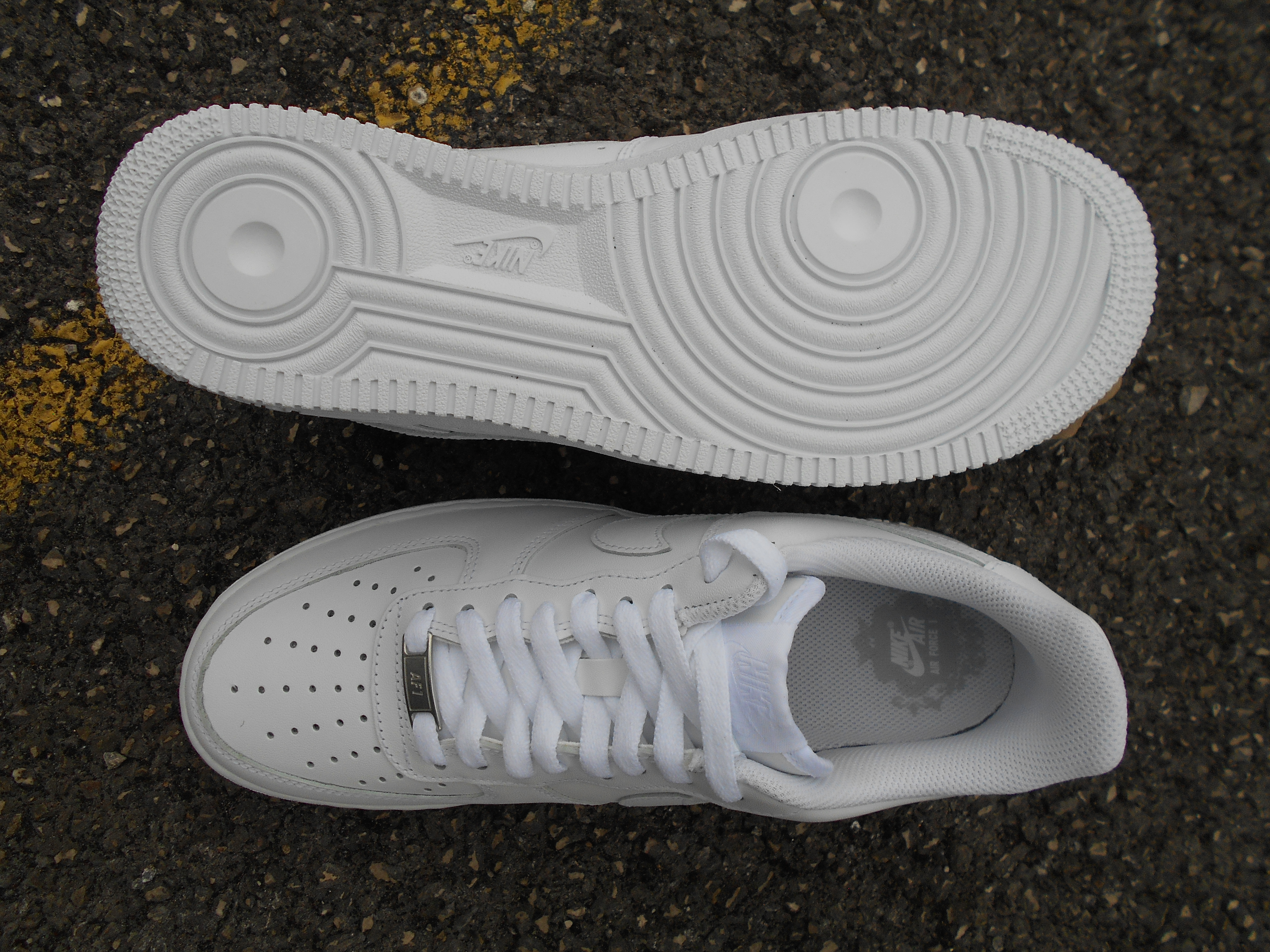
Nike Air Force 1 - upper side and under side

Nike Air Force is a range of athletic shoes made by Nike. It was created by designer Bruce Kilgore and was the first basketball shoe to use Nike's "Air" technology. The shoe is offered in low-, mid- and high-top styles.

== Description ==
The shoes are sold in three different styles: low, mid, and high. The mid comes with a connected strap. The high-top Air Force 1s come with a velcro strap; the mid-top strap is secured to the shoe while the high-top's strap is movable and removable on some versions. Although the shoe comes in different colors and color schemes, the most common Air Force 1s sold are solid white (also referred to as "white on white"), the second most common being solid black ("black on black"). Another identifying characteristic of an Air Force 1 shoe is a small medallion secured to the bottom of the laces but with holes on both sides so it can be removed by sliding it off the shoe lace. The medallion is engraved with the inscription "AF-1", with the year "'82" inscribed beside it, which has historically been colored silver.

== Models ==
=== Air Force 1 ===
The Nike Air Force 1 was designed by Bruce Kilgore in 1982. The name is a reference to Air Force One, the plane that carries the President of the United States. Nike Air Force 1s were ubiquitous in Harlem, New York, giving rise to the nickname "Uptowns".

The Air Force 1 began production in 1982 but was discontinued in 1984. It was re-introduced in 1986 with the modern italic Nike logo with a "Swoosh" insignia on the bottom of the back of the shoe. Little has changed to the Air Force One since its creation in 1982, although the stitching on the side panels of earlier versions is no longer present. Since its creation, over 1,700 color variations have been produced, bringing in an estimated annual revenue of US$800 million by 2007.

=== Air Force 2 ===
The Air Force 2 shoe introduced in 1987 is a newer variation of the original. The shoe is a typical flat-soled, casual-wear sneaker that can be made in many different variations of colors. Also, Air Force 2s were re-released internationally in the early 2000s. They can be made in either the low-cut or high-top style.

The shoe can be custom made in any color, but typically it has either a white or black based background with almost any color used to fill in the Nike Swoosh and back heel.

=== Air Force 3 ===
The Air Force 3 introduced in 1988 was the most popular version of the Air Force series. It was worn by many basketball players at the time. The Air Force III was more rugged looking and more durable than the previous two versions. The original colorway was white/medium grey/black, however several other colors were introduced shortly after. An actual "Air FORCE" logo was introduced on this model as well, with an image of half of a basketball on the tongue. This logo would be used on the rest of the Air Force series. The Air Force III was re-issued in 2006 in a very limited edition of colorways for the high top, and several colorways for the low top version.

=== Air Force STS ===
The Air Force STS (also known as Air Force 4 or Air Force IV) was introduced in 1989. It may be a reference to the Space Transportation System, the official name for the Space Shuttle. It was regularly worn by David Robinson in his rookie year. The Air Force STS features Nike's elephant print and is also slightly higher than the first three versions of the Air Force series.

=== Air Force 5 ===
The Air Force 5 was introduced in 1990. The Air Force V was the first model to make the airbag visible on the side heels of the shoe. The most popular colorway was white/medium grey/black/orange. Just like the previous version it was slightly higher than the first three versions.

=== Air Force 180 ===
The Air Force 180 was introduced in 1991. The new shoe followed the same design as the previous model with a visible air unit and featured a synthetic upper. This model also came in three versions. One with a velcro strap across the laces and another with a special pump unit to inflate the shoe with air.

=== Retro versions ===
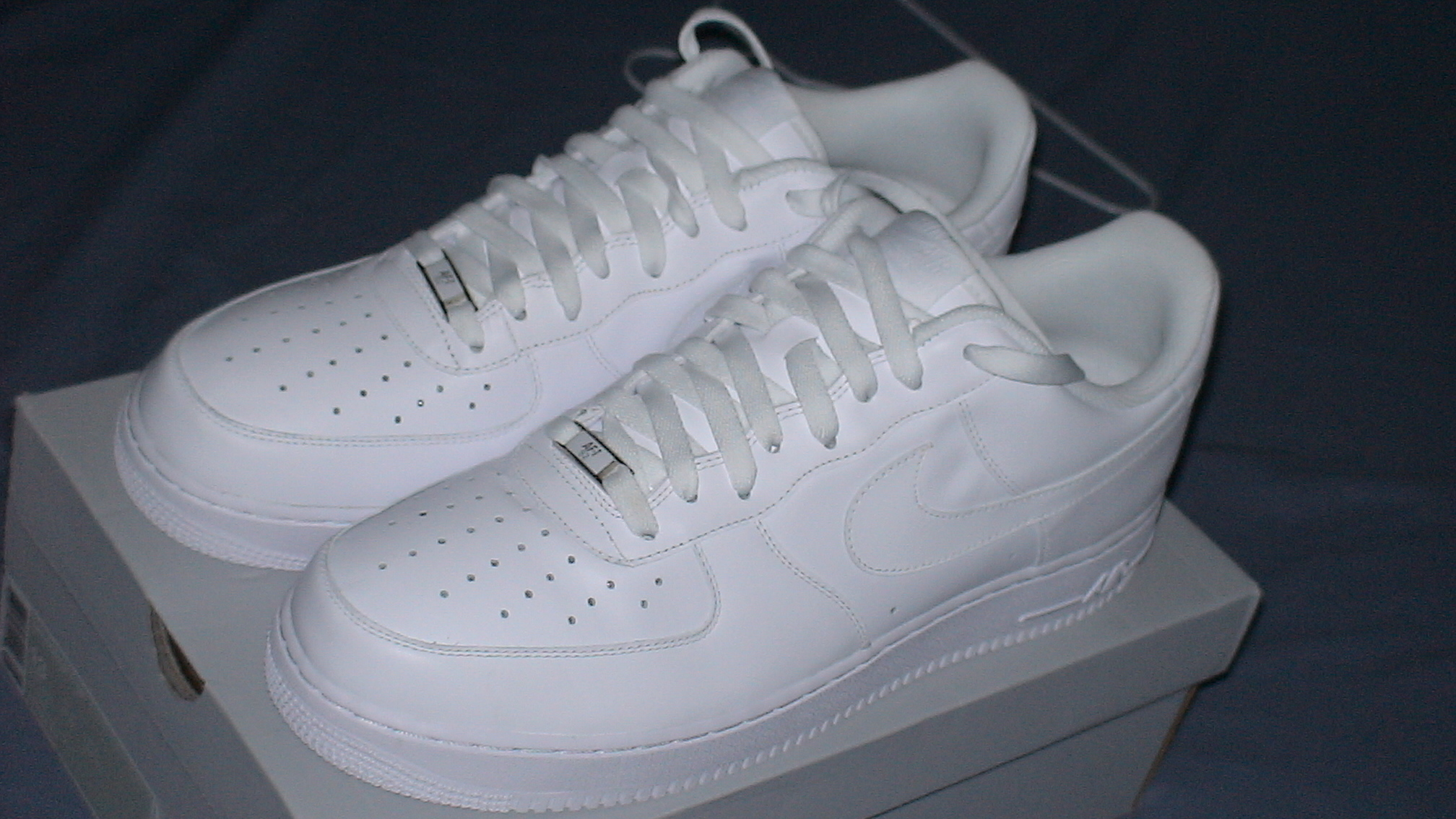
A pair of "white-on-white" retro low-top Air Force 1s

In 2007, for the 25th anniversary of Air Force 1, Nike created the Air Force XXV, which took inspiration from the original model. This version featured a mismatched set of medallions to commemorate its twenty fifth anniversary; one being from the original Air Force 1s with the other from the Air Force 25s.

To further commemorate the 25th anniversary of the Air Force 1, two high-end makes of the shoe were introduced. They were made in Italy, one from crocodile leather and the other from anaconda leather, and were adorned with gold aglets. They were sold in limited quantities and had a list price of $2000, making them some of the most expensive Nike sneakers sold at retail.

In 2009, Nike created Air Force 09, an update of the original shoe. The shoe comes in solid black or white.

In 2010, Nike commissioned DJ Clark Kent to design a Nike Air Force 1 Low pack of special limited edition Air Force 1 shoes.

In 2017, Nike partnered with Don C, Kareem "Biggs" Burke, Errolson Hugh, Travis Scott and Virgil Abloh for the 35th anniversary of the shoe.

== Performance use ==
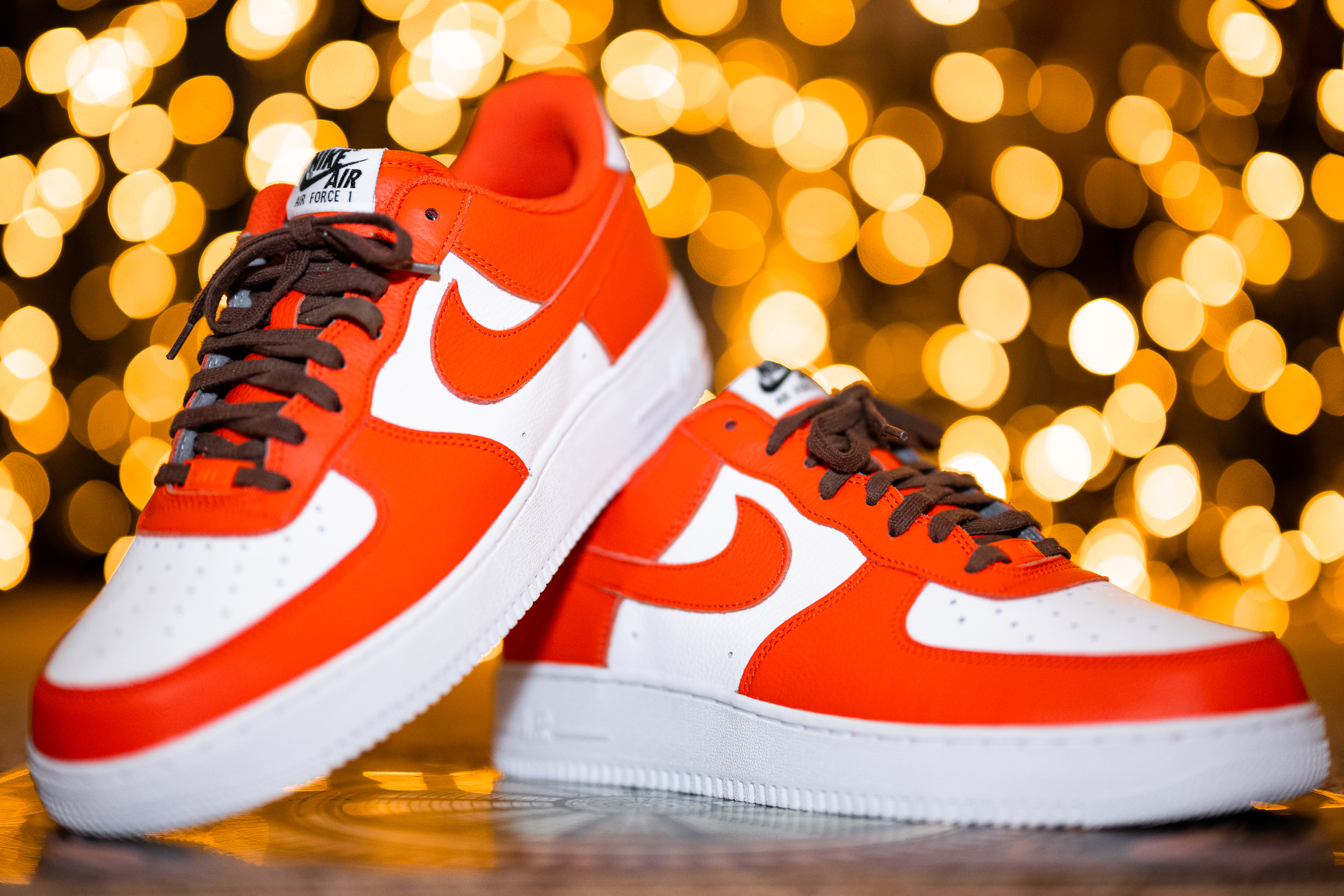
A pair of Air Force 1s in Cleveland Browns colors

As a performance shoe, the AF1 is still used for street play as well as for professional play. NBA players Jerry Stackhouse and Rasheed Wallace wore AF1s on the court. The shoe is also used for fashion and casual wear.

== Aftermarket sales ==
The selling of the Air Force Ones online by some retailers used to be prohibited by Nike, which restricted supply; the shoe may now be sold online. The Air Force One has become a favorite of sneaker collectors, often referred to as sneakerheads. Despite certain prohibition of sales in the early-production stage, Air Force (specifically Air Force 1) still stands as the top seller for NIKE and resellers since its release. Certain rare styles can cost several times their retail value.

== Lawsuit ==
Nike has vigorously defended the Air Force 1 in U.S. courts. In one case, it sued an alleged infringer of its trademark in the Air Force 1, who responded by filing a counterclaim to invalidate the Air Force 1 trademark. Several months later, fearful that the defendant's counterclaim could succeed, Nike suddenly gave the defendant an extremely broad "Covenant Not To Sue", then moved to dismiss all its own claims with prejudice and to also dismiss the defendant's counterclaim. The issue that went up on appeal was whether these tactics had thereby rendered the entire dispute moot (meaning there was no longer an active case or controversy), so that the U.S. federal courts had been deprived of jurisdiction to hear the defendant's counterclaim. On January 9, 2013, the U.S. Supreme Court unanimously ruled in Nike's favor.

== In popular culture ==
St. Louis rapper Nelly and his group, St. Lunatics, released a 2002 single titled "Air Force Ones" about the shoes. The shoe is also a focus of 2007 single "Classic (Better Than I've Ever Been)", a collaboration between Kanye West, Nas, Rakim and KRS-One. "Black Air Force 2s" are mentioned in the second line of the lyrics of the 2008 single "Dope Boys", released from The Game's third studio album, LAX.

From 2008 to 2014, Jax Teller (played by Charlie Hunnam) wears his trademark white-on-white retro low-top Air Force 1s throughout Sons of Anarchy, until they are discarded in the final episode of the series.

In 2016, Quicksilver (played by actor Evan Peters) uses a custom silver-colored Air Force 1 in the movie X-Men: Apocalypse.

In the late 2010s and 2020s, the slang term "black Air Force energy" – in reference to the black-on-black styling of the shoe – described someone or something that was wild, aggressive, and had flagrant disregard and contempt for others and established rules.

== See also ==
- List of shoe styles
