= Louisiana's 53rd House of Representatives district =

American legislative district

Louisiana's 53rd State House of Representatives district
Representative
Jessica Domangue; R–Houma

Louisiana's 53rd House of Representatives district is one of 105 Louisiana House of Representatives districts. It is currently represented by Republican Jessica Domangue of Houma. It was formerly represented by the two-term Speaker pro tempore of the Louisiana House, Tanner Magee.

== Geography ==
HD53 includes the communities of Chauvin and Dulac. Additionally, alongside its adjacent district of 52, it represents part of the city of Houma, including its local airport.

== Election results ==
Year	Winning candidate	Party	Percent	Opponent	Party	Percent
2011	Lenar Whitney	Republican	59.2%	Billy Hebert	Republican	40.8%
2015	Tanner Magee	Republican	60.8%	Lenar Whitney	Republican	39.2%
2019	Tanner Magee	Republican	100%			
2023	Jessica Domangue	Republican	51.6%	Dirk Guidry	Republican	48.4%
