= Randy Wiggins =

American politician

Member of the Louisiana House of Representatives
- In office 1996–2000
- Constituency: District 27

Personal details
- Party: Republican

Randy Wiggins is an American politician from the Republican Party of Louisiana. He represented District 27 in the Louisiana House of Representatives.

Wiggins endorsed the Donald Trump 2024 presidential campaign and was a delegate at the 2024 Republican National Convention.

He is a candidate in the 2025 election for Rapides Parish Police juror.
