= Bettina Trump =

American model and socialite (born 1986)

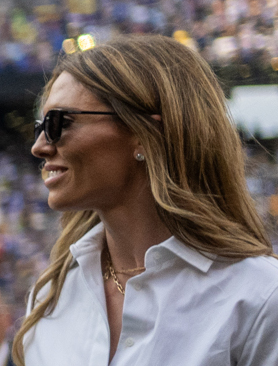
- Trump in 2025
- Born: Bettina Elisabeth Anderson; December 9, 1986 (age 39); Palm Beach, Florida, U.S.
- Education: Columbia University (BA)
- Political party: Republican
- Spouse: Donald Trump Jr. (m. 2026)
- Relatives: Trump family (by marriage)

Bettina Elisabeth Anderson Trump (born December 9, 1986) is an American socialite and model. She is married to Donald Trump Jr. and is a daughter-in-law of United States president Donald Trump.

== Early life and education ==
Bettina Elisabeth Anderson was born on December 9, 1986, in Palm Beach, Florida, to Harry Loy Anderson Jr. and Inger Anderson, and has a twin sister, Kristina. Her father, Harry Loy was a businessman who became the youngest bank president in the US at the age of 26. He led Worth Avenue National Bank, and was a board member of the Historical Society of Palm Beach County and the American Red Cross. Her mother, Inger is a former Swedish model.

Anderson attended a Montessori school and later the Palm Beach Day School, where she played lacrosse. She also attended Saint Andrew's School in Boca Raton; the Boca Raton News described Anderson as key to Saint Andrew's unbeaten lacrosse season in 2004. At Saint Andrew's, she founded a hair accessory business with Kristina.

Anderson graduated from Saint Andrew's in 2005 and from Columbia University in 2009 with a degree in art history, criticism, and conservation.

== Career ==
=== Socialite and modeling work (2005–present) ===
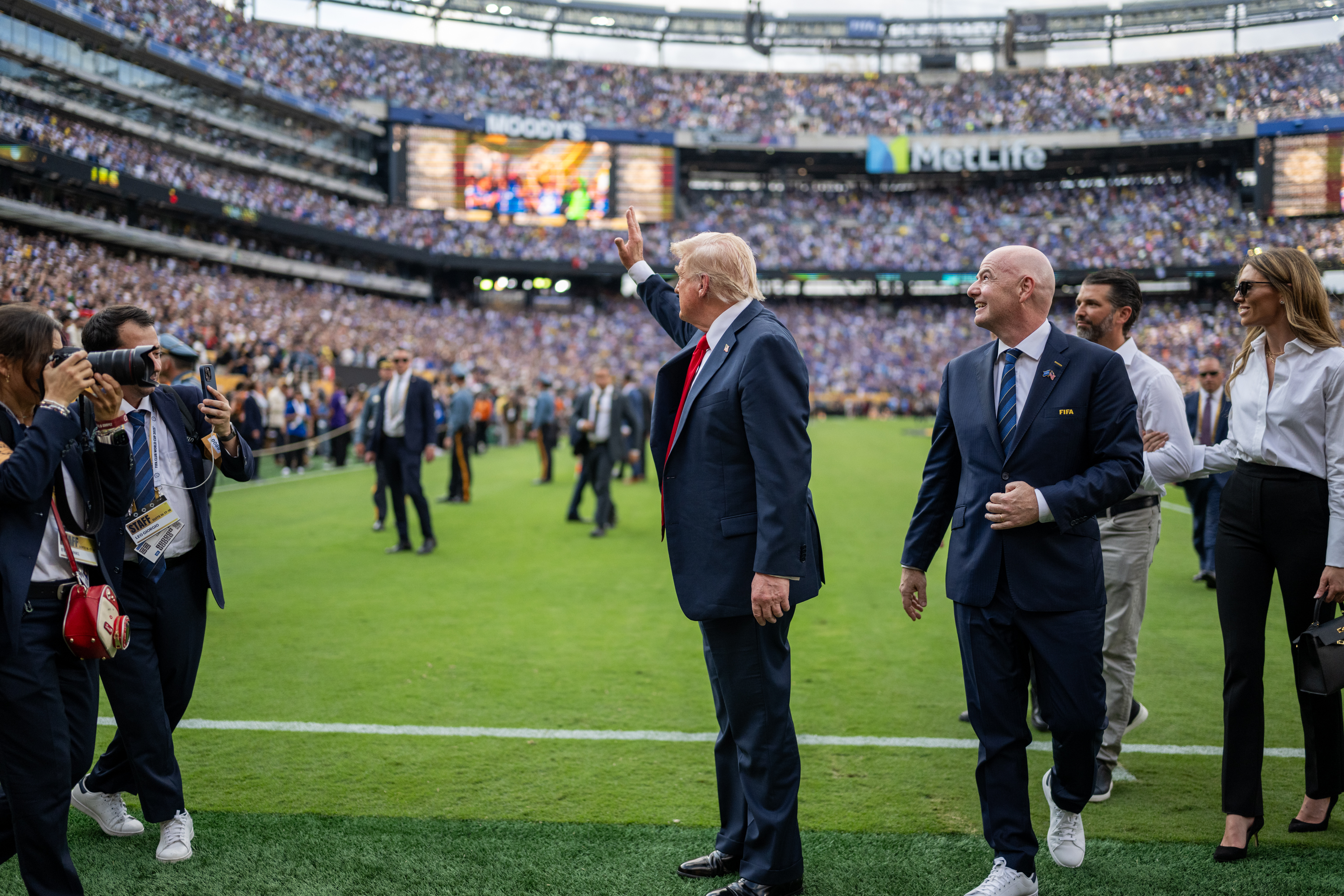
Anderson with Donald Trump Jr. (right) at the 2026 FIFA World Cup final.

In May 2005, P Model Management recruited Anderson for work in Milan. She modeled for the cover of Quest in 2020 and did a photoshoot with Hamilton Jewelers that year. Anderson has appeared on the cover of Society. She is a socialite in the Palm Beach area and has planned local fundraisers, including for the Preservation Foundation of Palm Beach.

=== Philanthropy ===
Anderson and her brothers founded The Paradise Fund, a nonprofit that assists with disaster relief. In October 2021, she led the fund's Project Paradise Film Fund, which supports media covering the wildlife of Florida. By April 2023, Anderson had become the executive director of The Paradise Fund, an organization that was later renamed to Paradise.ngo. She has advocated for the Hope for Depression Research Foundation and, according to People, has volunteered with the Literacy Coalition of Palm Beach County.

== Views ==
According to The Daily Telegraph, Anderson is a Republican. Amid the George Floyd protests in 2020, she supported the Black Lives Matter movement and encouraged followers to follow measures to mitigate the spread of COVID-19, including a post the day before the 2020 presidential election of her in a mask with a sign reading, "Only you can stop the spread of ignorance".

In October 2024, she held a fundraiser for Donald Trump.

== Personal life ==
In August 2024, the Daily Mail published photographs of Anderson and Trump Jr. at a bar, and in December, the Mail published additional photographs of Anderson and Trump Jr. holding hands. Anderson accompanied Trump Jr. to Serbia in March 2025, to the FIFA Club World Cup final in July, and to Trump's dinner with Saudi crown prince Mohammed bin Salman in November. The following month, the elder Trump announced his son's engagement to Anderson at a White House holiday party.

Anderson and Trump Jr. married in a private ceremony on May 21, 2026, followed by a private wedding celebration in the Bahamas on May 23, 2026.

In September 2026 ProPublica published information that Anderson's and Trump Jr.'s after wedding party was partially sponsored by their "dear friend", Russian oligarch close to Putin Umar Kremlev.

== See also ==
- Kai Trump (stepdaughter)
