= Louisiana's 27th House of Representatives district =

American legislative district

Louisiana's 27th State House of Representatives district
Representative
Michael T. Johnson; R–East Pineville

Louisiana's 27th House of Representatives district is one of 105 Louisiana House of Representatives districts. It is currently represented by Republican Michael T. Johnson of East Pineville.

== Geography ==
HD27 includes a small part of the city of Alexandria.

== Election results ==
Year	Winning candidate	Party	Percent	Opponent	Party	Percent
2011	Lowell Hazel	Republican	60.8%	Randy Wiggins	Republican	39.2%
2015	Lowell Hazel	Republican	64.9%	Chris Tyler	Republican	35.1%
2019 - Special	Michael T. Johnson	Republican	91.8%	Richard Kretzsinger	Democratic	8.2%
2019	Michael T. Johnson	Republican	100%			
2023	Michael T. Johnson	Republican	Cancelled			
