= Jerome Zeringue =

American politician

Member of the Louisiana House of Representatives from the 52nd district
- Incumbent
- Assumed office January 11, 2016
- Preceded by: Gordon Dove

Personal details
- Born: Thibodaux, Louisiana, U.S.
- Party: Republican
- Spouse: Julie Daigle Zeringue
- Children: 1
- Education: Louisiana State University (BS, MS)
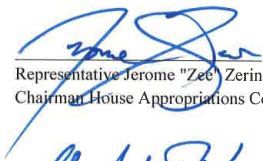
- Signature

Jerome Zeringue is an American politician serving as a member of the Louisiana House of Representatives from the 52nd district. A member of the Republican Party, Zeringue has been in office since January 11, 2016.

== Early life and education ==
Jerome Zeringue was born in Thibodaux, Louisiana. He graduated from Thibodaux High School and earned both a bachelor's and a master's degree from Louisiana State University, with degrees in zoology and fisheries biology, respectively.

== Political career ==
Zeringue has been serving as a member of the Louisiana House of Representatives since January 11, 2016. He was re-elected in 2019 and 2023 to continue his representation of District 52.
