= Vanessa Trump =

Ex-wife of Donald Trump Jr. (born 1977)

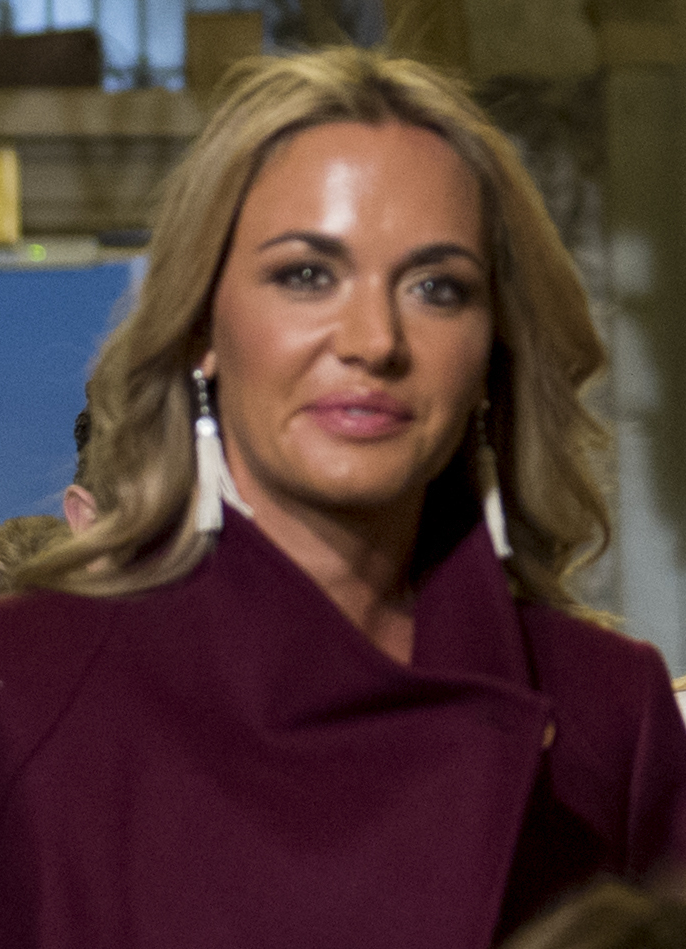
- Trump in 2017
- Born: Vanessa Kay Pergolizzi; December 18, 1977 (age 48); New York City, U.S.
- Other name: Vanessa Kay Haydon
- Education: Marymount Manhattan College
- Political party: Republican
- Spouse: Donald Trump Jr. (m. 2005; div. 2018)
- Partner(s): Khalid bin Bandar Al Saud (1998–2001); Tiger Woods (2024–present)
- Children: 5, including Kai
- Relatives: Kai Ewans (grandfather)

Vanessa Trump (née Vanessa Kay Pergolizzi, later Haydon; born December 18, 1977) is an American model. She is the ex-wife of Donald Trump Jr. They were married from 2005 to 2018, and had five children.

== Early life ==
Vanessa Kay Pergolizzi grew up in a townhouse on the Upper East Side of Manhattan, and attended the Dwight School on the Upper West Side. Her stepfather, Charles Haydon, was a lawyer. (Note: Some news articles have misidentified Charles Haydon as her father.) Her mother, Bonnie Kay Haydon, ran Kay Models, a modeling agency, and is of Danish and Swedish origin. Her maternal grandfather was Danish jazz musician Kai Ewans. Her biological father was of Italian descent.

== Career ==
Vanessa worked as a model in her teens and 20s. and was signed to Wilhelmina Models.

Vanessa appeared in a scene of the film Something's Gotta Give (2003).

In the fall of 2003, Vanessa and her sister Veronika opened a nightclub called Sessa.

In 2011, Vanessa appeared in an episode of The Apprentice, hosted by her then father-in-law, Donald Trump. She also appeared in an episode of Bret Michaels: Life as I Know It (2010).

From 2010 to 2013, Vanessa released her own line of handbags called La Poshett.

== Personal life ==
=== Relationships ===
During her teenage years, Vanessa dated local street gangster Valentín Rivera, a Latin Kings gang member. According to Rivera, he ended the relationship when the New York Post published a story that Vanessa was in a romantic relationship with Leonardo DiCaprio. DiCaprio's publicist denied the relationship.

From 1998 to 2001, Vanessa dated Saudi prince Khalid bin Bandar bin Sultan Al Saud. The relationship ended in 2001, when Khalid bin Bandar left the U.S. after his Saudi ambassador father, Bandar bin Sultan Al Saud, was suspected of having indirect ties to individuals linked with the Al Qaeda hijackers.

On November 12, 2005, she married Donald Trump Jr. The wedding was held at the Mar-a-Lago club in Florida; the service was officiated by Trump Jr.'s aunt, Judge Maryanne Trump Barry. Trump Jr. had proposed to her with a US$100,000 ring (equivalent to $165,000 in 2025) that he had received as a gift from a jeweler in exchange for proposing to her in front of paparazzi outside of the jeweler's store at the Short Hills mall in New Jersey.

The couple have five children together, the oldest of whom is Kai Trump, born in May 2007.

On March 15, 2018, she filed for an uncontested divorce in New York. In July 2018, they resolved a child custody issue, and the divorce was settled at the end of 2018.

She reportedly began a relationship with professional golfer Tiger Woods in November 2024. The relationship became public in March 2025, with Woods announcing it through Instagram. As of October 2026, Trump and Woods are still in a relationship.

=== Health ===
In May 2026, Vanessa announced that she had been diagnosed with breast cancer. In October 2026, Vanessa announced in a video with Kai Trump that she is cancer-free.
