= Donald Trump Jr. =

American businessman and activist (born 1977)

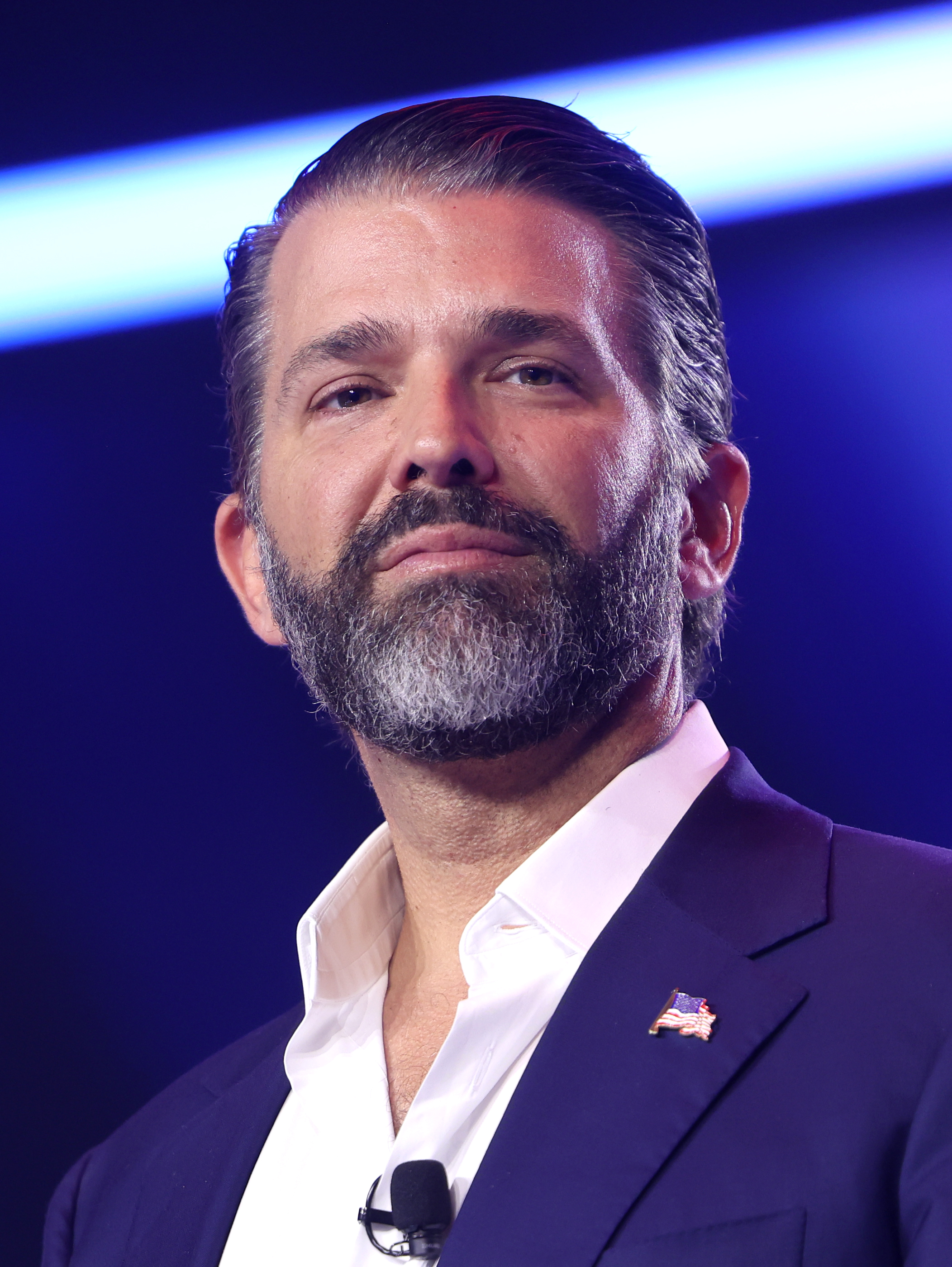
- Trump in 2025
- Born: Donald John Trump Jr. December 31, 1977 (age 48); New York City, U.S.
- Other name: Don Jr.
- Education: University of Pennsylvania (BS)
- Occupations: Businessman; activist; television presenter; author
- Known for: Executive in the Trump Organization; Former boardroom judge on The Apprentice
- Political party: Republican
- Spouses: Vanessa Haydon (m. 2005; div. 2018) Bettina Anderson (m. 2026)
- Partner: Kimberly Guilfoyle (2018–2024)
- Children: 5, including Kai
- Parents: Donald Trump (father); Ivana Zelníčková (mother)
- Family: Trump family
- Website: donjr.com

Donald John Trump Jr. (born December 31, 1977), often nicknamed Don Jr., is an American businessman and political activist. He is the eldest child of Donald Trump, the 45th and 47th president of the United States, and his first wife, Ivana Trump.

Trump is a trustee and executive vice president of the Trump Organization, running the company alongside his younger brother Eric. During their father's first presidency, the brothers continued to engage in deals and investments in foreign countries and collect payments at their U.S. properties from foreign governments, despite pledging not to do so. He was a boardroom judge on the reality TV show featuring his father, The Apprentice.

Trump was active in his father's 2016 presidential campaign. He cooperated with Russia in their interference in the 2016 United States elections and had a meeting with a Russian lawyer who promised damaging information about the campaign of Hillary Clinton in the 2016 presidential election. Trump campaigned for several Republicans during the 2018 midterm elections.

Trump was also active in his father's 2020 presidential campaign, often on the campaign trail and featured in the news for making unfounded claims. During the election, he called for "total war" as the results were counted and promoted the stolen election conspiracy theory. Following his father's defeat, he engaged in attempts to overturn the results. He spoke at the rally that led to the storming of the Capitol, where he threatened Trump's opponents that "we're coming for you."

Trump has authored two books: Triggered in 2019 and Liberal Privilege in 2020. In 2023, he launched a podcast, Triggered with Don Jr.

In 2024, Trump joined the venture capital firm 1789 Capital as a partner and joined the board of directors of Credova.

== Early life and education ==
Donald John Trump Jr. was born on December 31, 1977, in Manhattan, New York City, to Ivana and Donald Trump. He has two younger siblings, Ivanka and Eric. He also has two half siblings, Tiffany, from his father's marriage to Marla Maples, and Barron, from his father's current marriage to Melania Trump. Through his father, Trump is a grandson of Fred Trump and Mary Anne MacLeod, and a great-grandson of Frederick Trump and Elizabeth Christ Trump, the latter of whom founded what became the Trump Organization. As a boy, Trump found a role model in his maternal grandfather, Miloš Zelníček, who had a home near Prague, where he spent summers camping, fishing, hunting and learning the Czech language.

His parents divorced when he was 12 years old due to his father having an extramarital affair. Trump Jr. was estranged from his father for one year after the divorce, furious at his actions which broke up the family.

Trump was educated at Buckley School and The Hill School, a college preparatory boarding school in Pottstown, Pennsylvania, followed by the University of Pennsylvania's (Penn) Wharton School, where he graduated in 2000 with a B.S. in Economics.

== Career ==
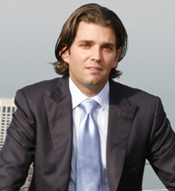
Trump in 2009

After graduating from Penn in 2000, Trump moved to Aspen, Colorado, where he hunted, fished, skied, lived in a truck, and worked as a bartender for a year, before returning to join the Trump Organization in New York. Trump has supervised building projects, which included 40 Wall Street, Trump International Hotel and Tower, and Trump Park Avenue, In 2006 he helped launch Trump Mortgage, which collapsed less than a year later. In 2010, he became a spokesperson and "executive director of global branding" for Cambridge Who's Who, a vanity publisher against whom hundreds of complaints had already been filed with the Better Business Bureau. He appeared as a guest adviser and judge on many episodes of his father's reality television show The Apprentice, from season 5 in 2006 to his father's last season in 2015.

=== Trump Organization ===
On January 11, 2017, Trump's father announced that he and his brother Eric would oversee a trust that included the Trump Organization's assets while his father was president, to avert a conflict of interest.

Amid the Trump–Ukraine scandal – where Trump asked the Ukrainian president to investigate Joe Biden and his son Hunter Biden – Trump Jr. strongly criticized Hunter Biden, accusing him of nepotism and leveraging his father as a means to get financial benefits. Trump Jr. said, "When you're the father and your son's entire career is dependent on that, they own you." Trump Jr. was widely ridiculed for these remarks by Trevor Noah and others. Trump Jr. is a high-level executive in his father's business and continued to operate and promote the family's businesses across the world during Trump's presidency. The Associated Press wrote of Trump Jr.'s, remarks that he was "showing no self-awareness that he, too, has at least in part been successful because of a famous father". According to The Washington Post fact-checker, Trump Jr.'s assertion that he and his family members had gotten out of foreign business deals after Trump became president is false. The Washington Post reported that after Trump became president, "Trump's sons have been busy selling assets to foreign individuals, expanding or adding onto their existing deals and investments in foreign countries, and collecting payments in U.S. properties from foreign governments."

In February 2018, advertisements in Indian newspapers promoted a deal whereby anyone who purchased Trump Organization apartments in Gurgaon before February 20 would be invited to have a "conversation and dinner" with Trump Jr. The ads were criticized by corruption watchdogs as unethical.

A ruling which was handed down on February 16, 2024 barred Trump from serving as an officer or director of any New York corporation or other legal entity in New York, including the Trump Organization, for two years.

In November 2024, Trump announced that he would be joining 1789 Capital as a partner. In 2025, he announced that the firm would invest in the Enhanced Games, a proposed sports event that will allow performance enhancing drugs. He joined the advisory board of drone company Unusual Machines in November 2024.

In December 2024, it was announced that Trump was joining the board of directors of PublicSquare.

=== Podcast ===
In 2023, Trump launched a podcast, Triggered with Don Jr, on the platform Rumble.

=== Executive Branch private membership club ===
In April 2025, the Executive Branch, a Washington, D.C., private membership club opened with a party that was reported to have included members of the Trump administration, "wealthy CEOs, tech founders, and policy experts". The club was co-founded by Trump, David O. Sacks, Cameron Winklevoss, and Tyler Winklevoss, and is owned by Trump, Omeed Malik, Chris Buskirk of Rockbridge Network and 1789 Capital, and Alex and Steve Witkoff, sons of Steve Witkoff.

== Involvement in politics ==
=== 2016 presidential campaign ===
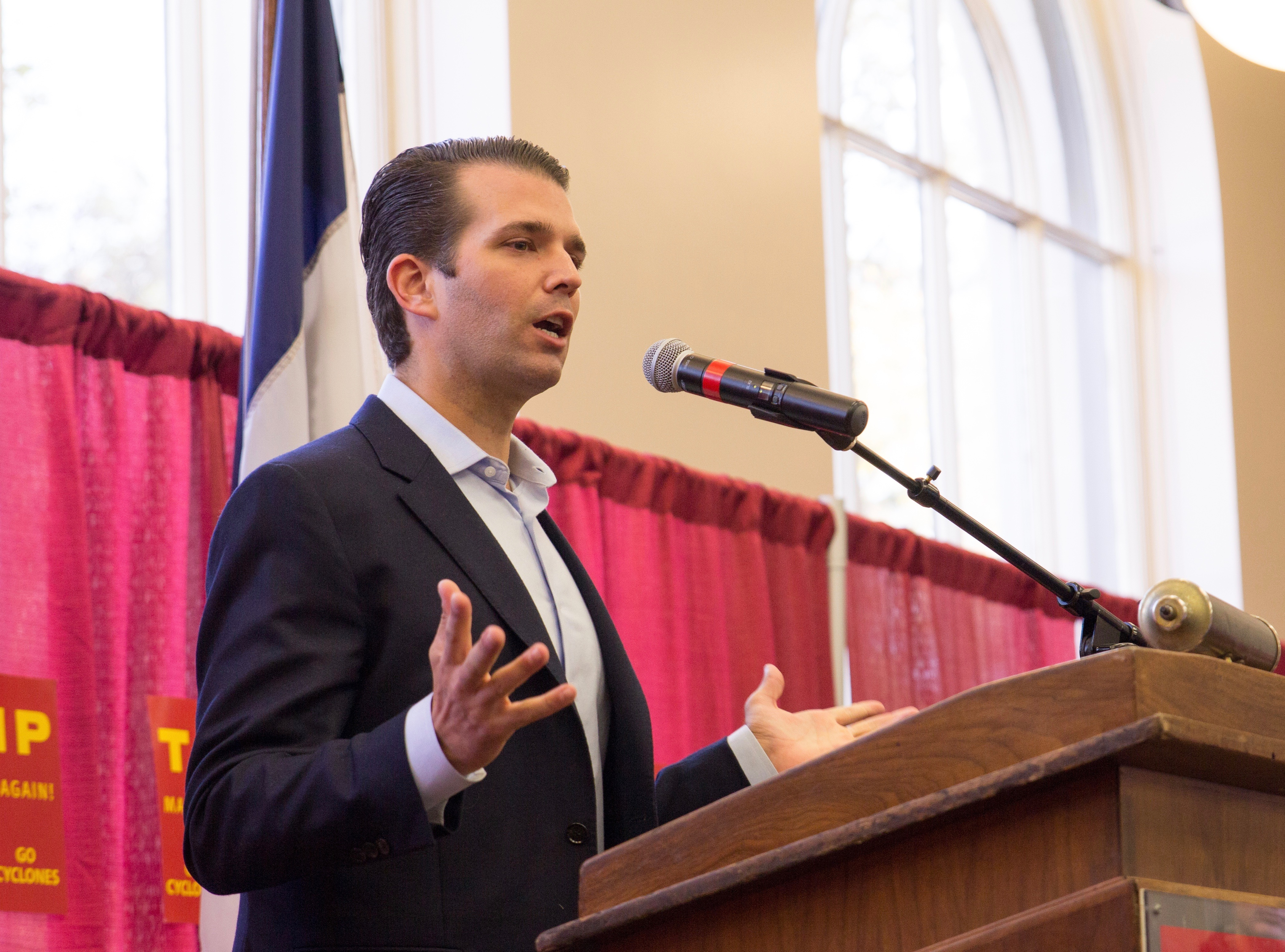
Trump Jr. campaigning for his father in Iowa, November 2016

Ahead of the 2016 presidential election, Trump Jr. was a central member of his father's campaign, characterized by The New York Times as a "close political adviser". He spoke at the Republican National Convention, along with his siblings Ivanka, Eric and Tiffany.

Trump Jr. influenced his father's choice of Secretary of the Interior Ryan Zinke during the presidential transition. Since his father's victory in the 2016 election, Trump Jr. has developed what The Washington Post calls a "public persona as a right-wing provocateur and ardent defender of Trumpism". The Atlantic reported in 2019 that Trump had described Trump Jr. in 2017 as "not the sharpest knife in the drawer". Trump Jr. earned the nickname "Fredo" among some Trump campaign staffers, a reference to a character in The Godfather.

==== Trump Tower meeting ====
On June 9, 2016, Trump Jr. attended a meeting arranged by publicist Rob Goldstone on behalf of Azerbaijani-Russian businessman Emin Agalarov. The meeting was held in Trump Tower in Manhattan, among three members of the presidential campaign: Trump Jr., Jared Kushner, and Paul Manafort – and Russian lawyer Natalia Veselnitskaya, her translator Anatoli Samochornov, Russian-American lobbyist Rinat Akhmetshin, and Ike Kaveladze, a Georgian-American, U.S.-based senior vice president at Crocus Group, the real estate development company run by Aras Agalarov.

Approximately a year later, Trump Jr. initially told the media that adoption of Russian children was the main subject of the meeting. On July 8, 2017, Trump Jr. tweeted his email exchange with Goldstone. It revealed that Trump Jr. had agreed to attend the meeting with the understanding he would receive information damaging to Hillary Clinton. Goldstone also wrote in one of Trump Jr.'s publicly disclosed emails that the Russian government was involved. Robert Mueller, the special counsel of the Department of Justice in charge of Russia-related investigations, investigated the emails and the meeting. Although the White House lauded Trump Jr. for his transparency, he released the e-mails only after The New York Times had informed him that they had them and were going to publish a story about them.

In June 2019, Republicans and Democrats on the Senate Intelligence Committee made a criminal referral of Trump Jr. to federal prosecutors on suspicions that he misled the committee with his testimony.

==== Meeting with Gulf states emissary ====
Trump Jr. had a meeting in August 2016 with an emissary for the United Arab Emirates and Saudi Arabia who offered help to the Trump presidential campaign. The meeting included Joel Zamel, an Israeli specialist in social media manipulation; George Nader, an envoy representing the crown princes of the United Arab Emirates and Saudi Arabia; and American businessman Erik Prince.

==== Correspondence with WikiLeaks ====
In November 2017, news broke that Julian Assange had used the WikiLeaks Twitter account to correspond with Donald Trump Jr. during the 2016 presidential election. Trump Jr. had already provided this correspondence to congressional investigators who were looking into Russian interference in the 2016 election.

The correspondence showed that WikiLeaks actively solicited the cooperation of Trump Jr., who was a campaign surrogate and advisor in the campaign of his father. WikiLeaks urged the Trump campaign to reject the results of the 2016 presidential election at a time when it appeared the Trump campaign would lose. WikiLeaks asked Trump Jr. to share a made-up claim by True Pundit that Hillary Clinton had wanted to attack Assange with drones. WikiLeaks also shared a link to a website that would help people search through the hacked e-mails of Clinton campaign manager John Podesta, which WikiLeaks had recently made public. Trump Jr. shared both.

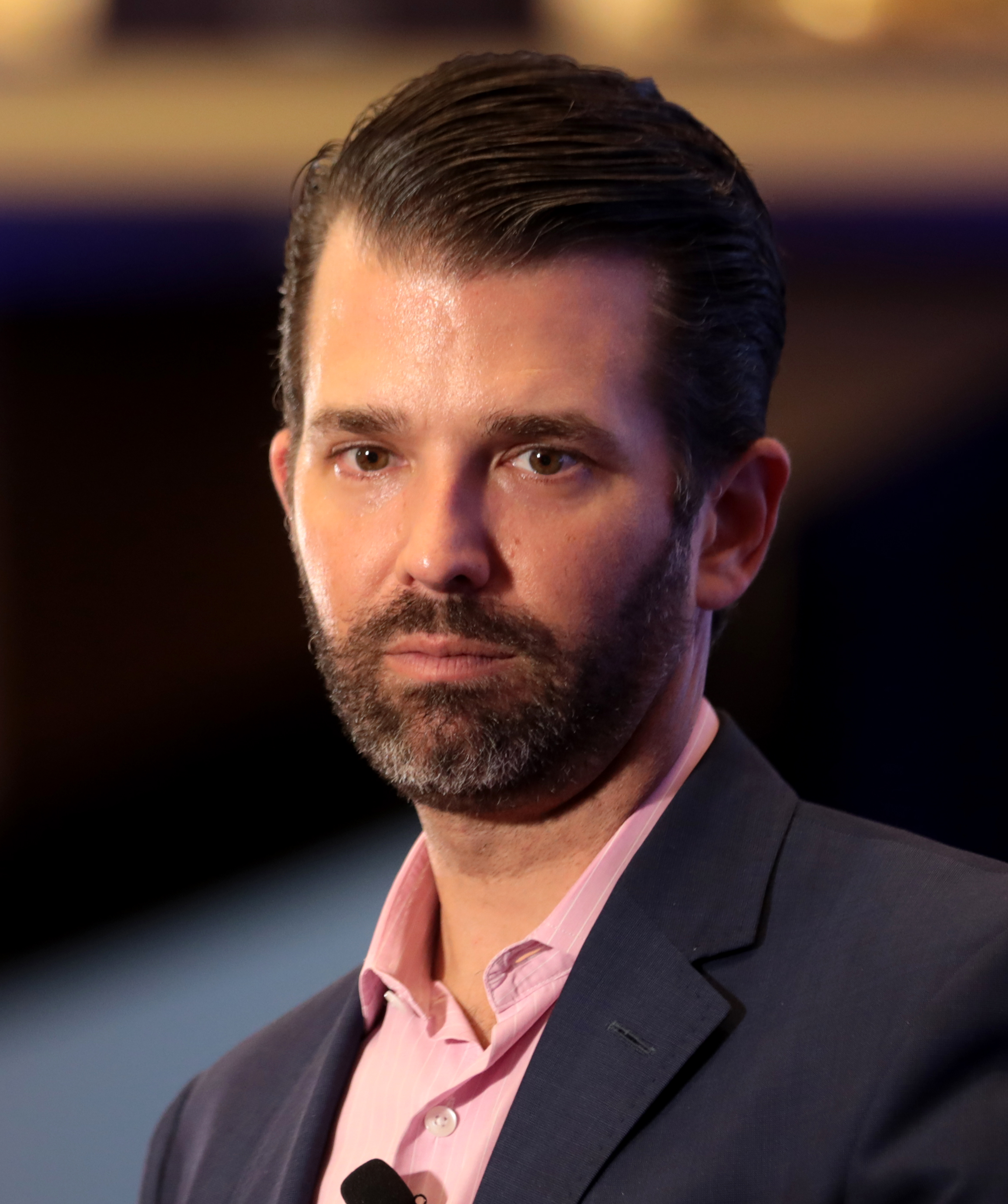
Trump Jr. speaks at the 2019 Teen Student Action Summit hosted by Turning Point USA, 2019.

=== 2018 midterm election campaigns ===
During the 2018 midterms election cycle, Trump actively campaigned on behalf of Republican candidates, including for Matt Rosendale, Patrick Morrisey, Mike Braun, Ron DeSantis, Lee Zeldin and Matt Gaetz. He raised millions of dollars for Republican candidates, was second only to his father in his ability to draw crowds to campaign events, and is credited with helping Republican candidates win.

=== Other political activities ===
In 2007, Trump Jr. gave $4,000 to then-Senator Hillary Clinton's campaign to be the Democratic presidential nominee.

In 2011, Trump Jr. responded to criticism of the Tea Party movement by Florida representative Frederica Wilson by confusing Wilson with California representative Maxine Waters and saying her colorful hats made her look like a stripper.

In April 2017, he campaigned for Montana congressional candidate Greg Gianforte, and in May met with Republican National Committee officials to discuss the party's strategy and resources.

In September 2017, Trump Jr. asked to have his Secret Service detail removed, telling friends he wanted more privacy, the second presidential child to do so. (Note: Ron Reagan and his wife, Doria Palmieri, dropped their service in 1982, citing similar privacy reasons.) The request was criticized by former Secret Service agents. Trump Jr.'s protection was restored later that month.

In October 2020, it was reported that Pennsylvania Republicans were suggesting Trump Jr. run for the vacant Senate seat in Pennsylvania in 2022 after two-term incumbent Pat Toomey announced he would not be seeking re-election. In the same month, Trump Jr. held a crowded indoor rally where attendees did not wear masks, contradicting public health guidelines.

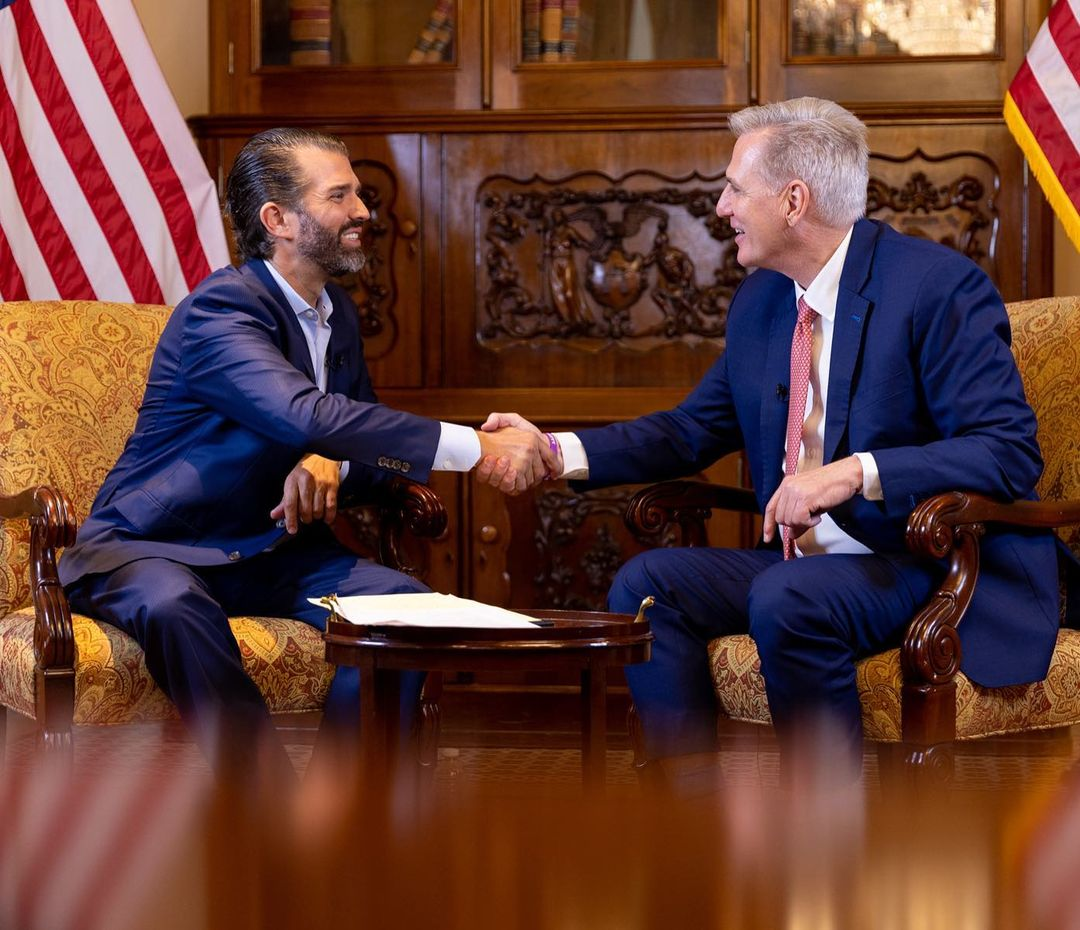
Trump Jr. with Speaker of the House Kevin McCarthy in 2023

In an October 29 interview with Fox News's Laura Ingraham, Trump Jr. asserted that the coronavirus death rate has dropped to "almost nothing", adding "(b)ecause we've gotten control of this thing. We understand how it works – they have the therapeutics to be able to deal with this. If you look at that, look at my Instagram, it's gone down to almost nothing." On that day, the number of coronavirus deaths in the U.S. was 1,063.

Before his father's loss in the 2020 election, Trump was the subject of speculation for a 2024 run for president. In October 2020, he posted a photo to his Instagram account of a "Don Jr. 2024" flag.

At the 2024 Republican National Convention, he led the introductions of JD Vance, who had been selected as Donald Trump's running mate.

=== Michael Cohen reimbursement payments ===
On May 28, 2024, an email was shown during defense closing arguments in Trump Sr.'s New York criminal trial which revealed that longtime Trump Organization comptroller Jeffrey McConnery, who was previously acknowledged to have organized Trump Sr.'s reimbursement payments to Michael Cohen following the hush money payments Cohen made to Stormy Daniels, sought approval from both Trump Jr. and Eric Trump. Trump Jr. signed some of the reimbursement checks to Cohen as well.

== Views ==
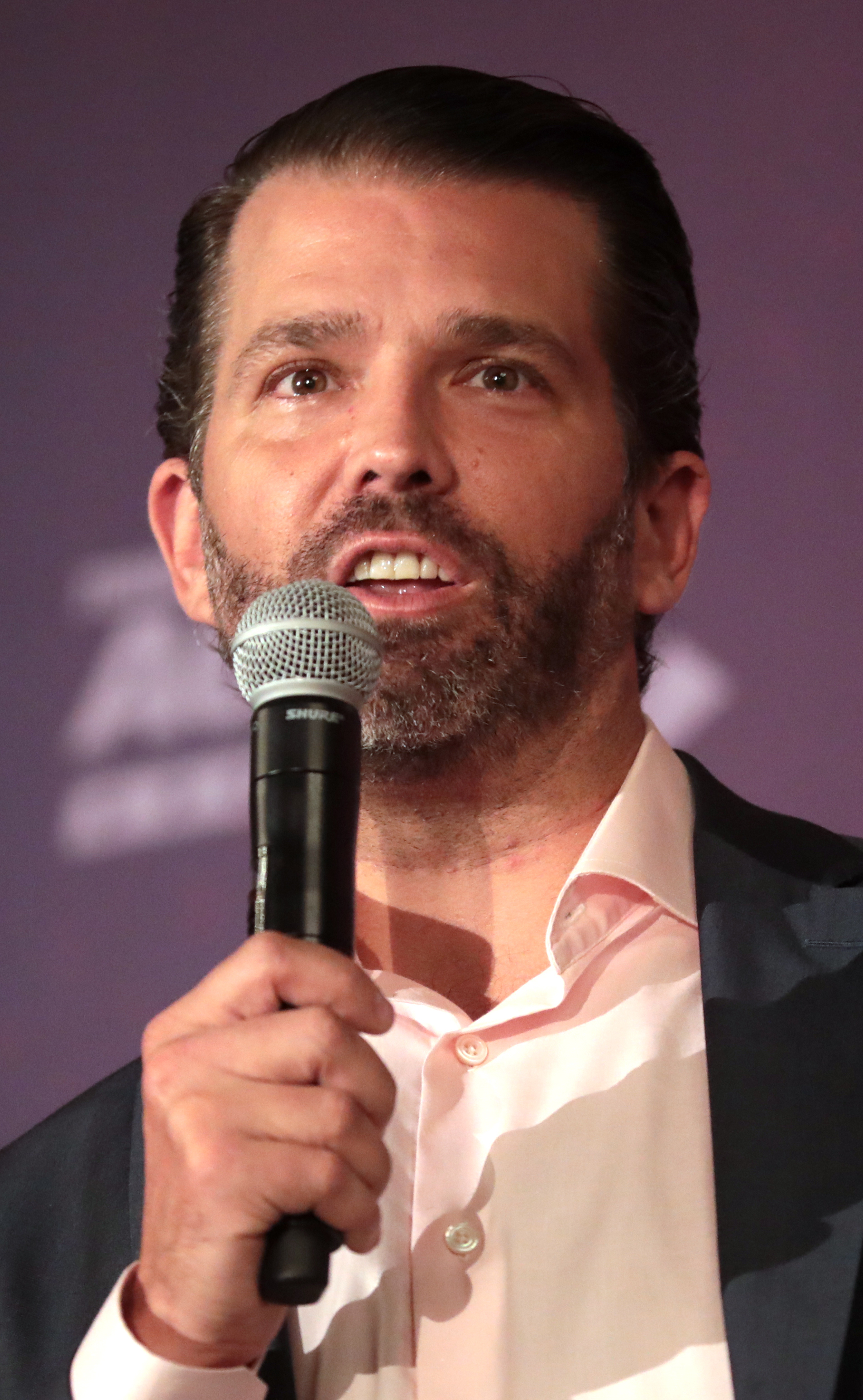
Trump Jr. speaking in 2020

=== Race and immigration ===
During his father's presidential campaign, Trump Jr. caused controversy in 2016 when he posted an image that compared Syrian refugees to Skittles, saying "If I had a bowl of Skittles and I told you just three would kill you, would you take a handful? That's our Syrian refugee problem." The makers of Skittles condemned the tweet, saying "Skittles are candy. Refugees are people. We don't feel it's an appropriate analogy." The Cato Institute stated that year that the chances "an American would be killed in a terrorist attack committed by a refugee was one in 3.64 billion" per year.

On March 1, 2016, an interview with white supremacist James Edwards and Trump Jr. was aired. The campaign initially denied the interview had taken place; later Trump Jr. claimed it was unintentional. As a consequence of the interview, mainstream media outlets have accused Trump Jr. of being either a believer in the white genocide conspiracy theory, or pretending to be an advocate for political gain.

In September 2016, Trump Jr. cited Holocaust imagery to criticize what he perceived as the mainstream media's uncritical coverage of Hillary Clinton during her campaign, by "letting her slide on every discrepancy", while also accusing Democrats involved in the 2016 campaign of lying. Trump Jr. said if the Republicans were committing the same offences mainstream outlets would be "warming up the gas chamber right now". Also that month, Trump Jr. shared an image on Instagram depicting a cross between his father and Pepe the Frog. When asked on Good Morning America about Pepe the Frog and its associations with white supremacy, Trump Jr. said he had never heard of Pepe the Frog and thought it was just a "frog with a wig".

In April 2017, Trump Jr. lauded conspiracy theorist Mike Cernovich, who has promoted the debunked white genocide and Pizzagate conspiracy theories, saying, "In a long gone time of unbiased journalism he'd win the Pulitzer".

In August 2020, the Southern Poverty Law Center reported that Trump Jr. appeared at a far-right "We Build the Wall" event with Jack Posobiec in July 2019.

=== Promotion of conspiracy theories ===
Trump Jr. retweeted conspiratorial remarks by white supremacist Kevin B. MacDonald about alleged favors exchanged by Hillary Clinton and Switzerland's largest bank. On the campaign trail, Trump Jr. promoted Alex Jones' conspiracy theory that Hillary Clinton wore an earpiece to a presidential forum and that official unemployment rates were manipulated for political purposes.

In May 2017, Trump Jr. promoted what CNN called the "long-debunked, far-right conspiracy theory" that Bill Clinton was linked to Vince Foster's death. In November, Trump Jr. again promoted the conspiracy theory that the Clintons had murdered people.

In February 2018, Trump Jr. liked two tweets promoting a conspiracy theory that survivors of the Stoneman Douglas High School shooting were coached into propagating anti-Trump rhetoric.

In May 2018, Trump Jr. retweeted a false and antisemitic conspiracy theory that George Soros, the Jewish Hungarian-American businessman and philanthropist, was a "nazi [sic] who turned in his fellow Jews to be murdered in German concentration camps & stole their wealth". The tweets originated from Roseanne Barr, whose TV show Roseanne was canceled the same day after she had posted a series of racist and antisemitic tweets. A spokesperson for Soros responded to the tweets, "George Soros survived the Nazi occupation of Hungary as a 13-year-old child by going into hiding and assuming a false identity with the help of his father, who managed to save his own family and help many other Jews survive the Holocaust".

In September 2018, when Hurricane Florence was affecting the United States, Trump Jr. tweeted a picture of CNN journalist Anderson Cooper waist-deep in floodwaters when another man in the same picture was standing knee-deep a distance away. In the same tweet, Trump Jr. included a link to a Breitbart News article claiming that CNN's ratings had dropped by 41%, and proposed a conspiracy theory that CNN was "lying to try to make [his father, President Trump] look bad". In actuality, the picture of Cooper was about 10 years old, taken during 2008's Hurricane Ike before Trump became president, and Cooper was videoed talking about how the floodwaters were receding.

In May 2020, Trump Jr. falsely accused Joe Biden of being a pedophile. After Biden was diagnosed with prostate cancer in May 2025, Trump Jr. launched a conspiracy theory questioning how Jill Biden, who received a doctoral degree, missed the signs and whether it was covered up. Trump Jr.'s response was seen as an outlier compared to other politicians including his father's, and was a subject of criticism. However, he had also liked a post wishing Biden a speedy recovery, "politics aside."

In November 2020, after Pfizer announced that it had developed a COVID-19 vaccine with 90% effectiveness, Trump Jr. suggested that the vaccine had been held back in order to hurt his father's chances of winning the election. Pfizer CEO Albert Bourla dismissed the suggestion, saying that the company had always planned to rely on the "speed of science".

After Russia invaded Ukraine in February 2022, Trump Jr. amplified baseless Russian state propaganda which claimed that the US and Ukraine were developing biological weapons.

=== COVID-19 misinformation ===
Trump Jr. was given a 12-hour restriction by Twitter in July 2020 after he promoted misinformation about COVID-19 by retweeting a video showing Houston doctor Stella Immanuel promoting hydroxychloroquine as a cure, despite conflicting studies, and by claiming that masks were unnecessary. Twitter later said that it restricted his ability to tweet or retweet for 12 hours for violating its COVID-19 misinformation policy.

On October 29, 2020, Trump Jr. criticized the media's focus on new infections rather than on deaths, saying on Fox News, "why aren't they talking about deaths? Oh, oh, because the number is almost nothing. Because we've gotten control of this, and we understand how it works." On the day Trump Jr. made that comment, the United States registered roughly 1,000 COVID-19 deaths.

=== Other ===
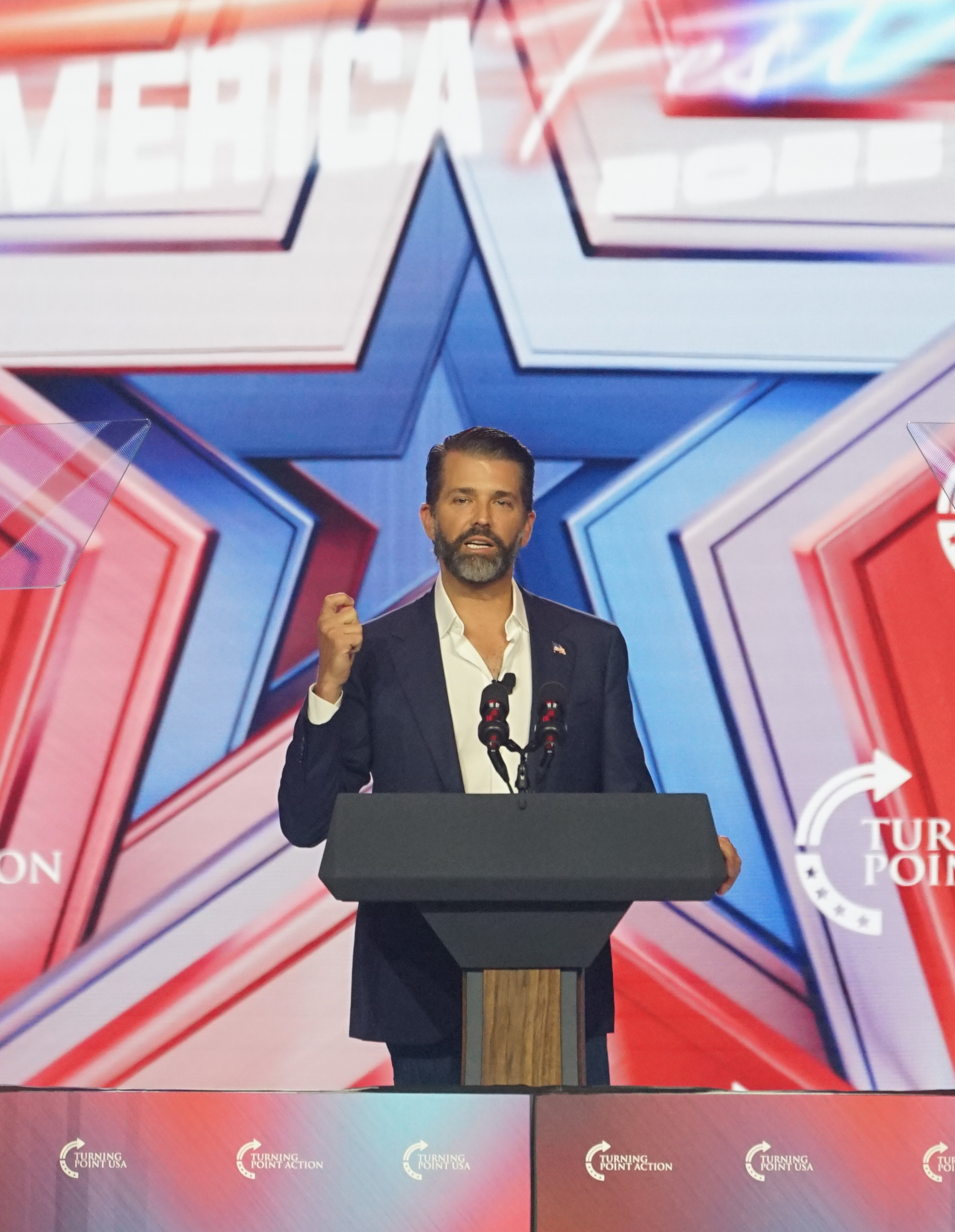
Trump Jr. at AmericaFest 2025

In November 2019, Trump Jr. tweeted the name of the alleged whistleblower who brought to light the Trump-Ukraine scandal. Whistleblower conventions are intended to protect the identity of individuals who expose wrongdoing in government. Agence France-Presse attempted to independently verify the identity that Trump Jr. tweeted but was unable to do so.

In June 2020, during the COVID-19 pandemic, Trump Jr. accused liberals of hypocrisy, for imposing restrictive measures and social distancing guidelines on businesses while holding the "Action for Black Trans Lives" protest for the rights of African American transgender people.

Trump Jr. has accused big tech companies of being biased against conservatives and has claimed that a deep state sought to undermine Trump during his presidency.

== Attempts to overturn the 2020 election ==
Trump had a prominent role in his father's attempts to overturn the 2020 United States presidential election, threatening Republican lawmakers who did not take part in it. In November 2020, he advocated "total war" instead of completion of vote counting in the 2020 United States elections.

CNN reported in April 2022 that two days after the election, Trump Jr. sent a text message to White House Chief of Staff Mark Meadows outlining paths to subvert the Electoral College process and ensure his father a second term. He wrote, "It's very simple. We have multiple paths. We control them all. We have operational control. Total leverage. Moral high ground. POTUS must start second term now." He continued, "Republicans control 28 states Democrats 22 states. Once again Trump wins," adding, "We either have a vote WE control and WE win OR it gets kicked to Congress 6 January 2021." Biden had not yet been declared the winner at the time of the text.

=== Relation to the January 6 Capitol attack ===
Together with his father and other speakers, on January 6, 2021, Trump Jr. spoke to an audience and, speaking about reluctant GOP lawmakers saying, "If you're gonna be the zero and not the hero, we're coming for you". President Trump further incited the crowd which then marched to the US Capitol building, where they forced entry, broke windows and vandalized the building. One woman was killed, and a police officer and three other people died during or shortly after the incursion.

Television host and former congressman Joe Scarborough called for the arrest of Trump Jr., along with his father and Rudolph Giuliani, for insurrection against the United States. Following his father's permanent ban from Twitter on January 8, 2021, Donald Trump Jr. claimed that free speech "no longer exists in America".

On March 5, 2021, Representative Eric Swalwell filed a civil lawsuit against Trump Jr. and three others (his father, Representative Mo Brooks, and Rudy Giuliani), seeking damages for their alleged role in inciting the riot.

In December 2021, text messages released by Meadows revealed that Trump Jr. begged Meadows to persuade his father to stop the attack.

=== Criminal investigation ===
On January 11, 2021, D.C. attorney general Karl Racine said that Donald Trump Jr. is a person of interest in the criminal investigation of the attack on the U.S. Capitol and that he is looking at whether to charge him, along with Rudy Giuliani and Mo Brooks, with inciting the violent attack.

== Misuse of inaugural funds investigation ==
On January 14, 2021, it became known that Trump Jr. is a person of interest in the criminal investigation into misuse of his father's inaugural funds in Washington D.C., and that prosecutors intend to interview him over his role in "grossly overpaying" for use of event space at the Trump Hotel in Washington for the 2017 inauguration. In May 2022, D.C. Attorney General Karl Racine reached a $750,000 settlement with the inaugural committee without requiring an admission of wrongdoing.

== Books ==
=== Triggered: How the Left Thrives on Hate and Wants to Silence Us ===
In 2019, Trump Jr. released the book, Triggered: How the Left Thrives on Hate and Wants to Silence Us. The book is critical of political correctness, and argues that the American left has a victimhood complex. The Washington Post commented: "yet, in his telling, the real victim is often him, his father or another Trump family member". In the book, Trump Jr. pushes conspiracy theories about how the intelligence community has attempted to harm President Trump, comparing President Trump's experiences with the FBI harassment campaign against civil rights leader Martin Luther King Jr. Trump Jr. wrote of a visit to Arlington National Cemetery (a military cemetery), commenting that he got emotional looking at the graves and that it reminded him of "all the sacrifices" the Trump family had made, including "voluntarily giving up a huge chunk of our business and all international deals to avoid the appearance that we were 'profiting off of the office'." Fact-checkers have reported that Trump still owns the family business, and that the Trump family have continued to engage in international business deals since Trump became president. In a review for The Washington Post, Carlos Lozada said that it "fails as memoir and as polemic: its analysis is facile, its hypocrisy relentless, its self-awareness marginal (the writing is wretched, even by the standards of political vanity projects)".

The book was a New York Times best-seller. The book was purchased in bulk by at least nine Republican organizations, candidates or advocacy groups, including N.R.C.C. and the RNC which bought $75,000 and $100,000 worth of the books, respectively. Turning Point USA and the National Republican Senatorial Committee purchased approximately 2,000 and 2,500 books, respectively.

=== Liberal Privilege: Joe Biden and the Democrats' Defense of the Indefensible ===
In 2020, Trump Jr. self-published the book Liberal Privilege: Joe Biden and the Democrats' Defense of the Indefensible. Trump Jr. reportedly hired three researchers to collect information about Joe Biden and spent three months writing the book. Trump Jr. explained to The New York Times his reasons: "While I had no plans for a book this year, I was stuck indoors like the rest of the nation during the pandemic", he said, adding that he "decided to highlight Biden's half century of being a swamp monster, since the media wouldn't do it". The same article stated that he decided to self-publish because he could count on the publicity of "his own platform – and the promise of bulk purchases from the RNC".

The book was indeed bought in bulk by the RNC. On October 28, 2020, the RNC paid over $300,000 of donor money to Pursuit Venture LLC, a company owned by Trump Jr., for "donor mementos". It was the most money the RNC had ever paid for this purpose. The hardcover retails for $29.99, which suggests roughly how many copies might have been purchased, and the RNC's intent was to give a copy to people who donated $50–$100.

== Personal life ==
=== Family ===
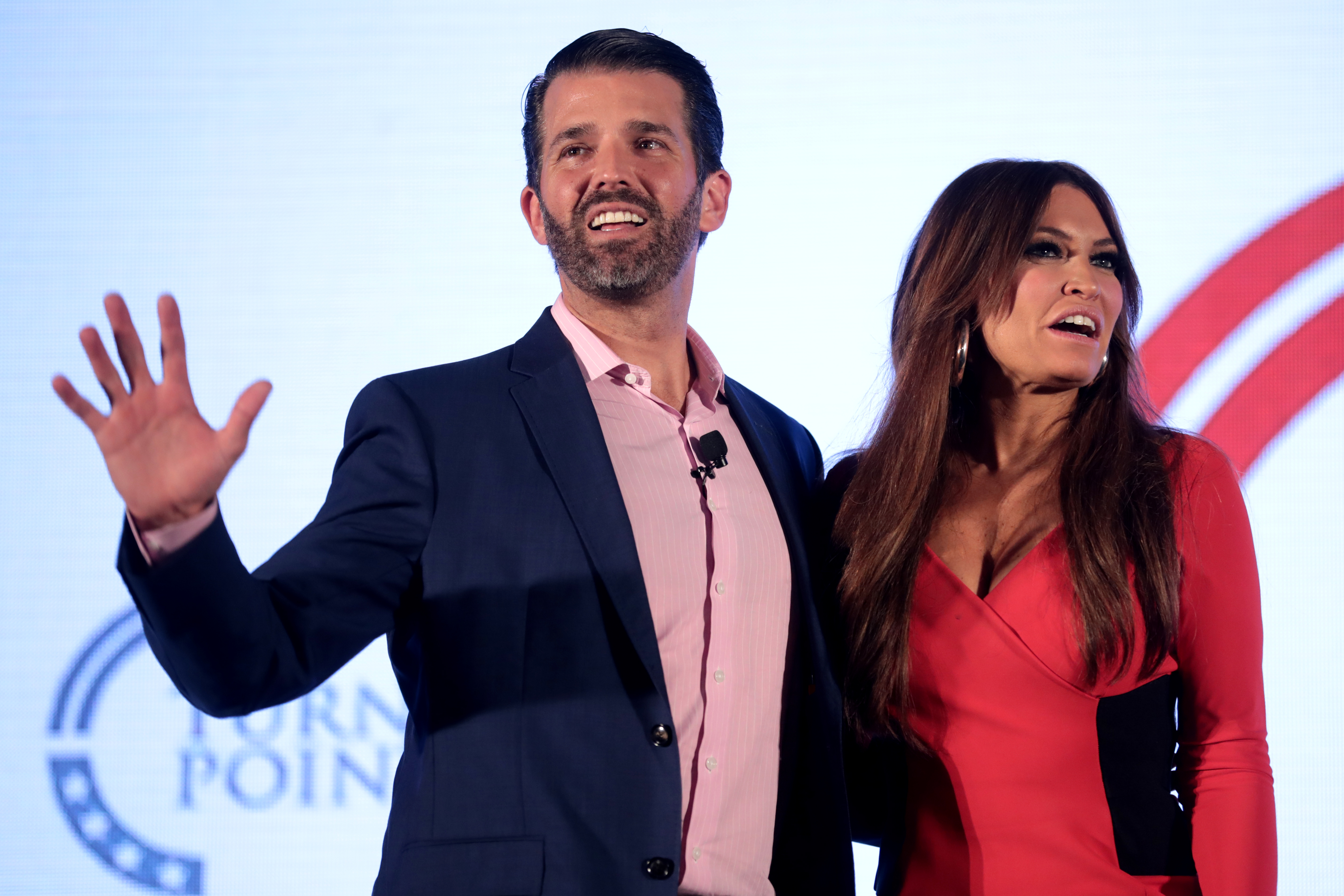
Trump Jr. with Kimberly Guilfoyle in July 2019

In 2003, Trump Jr. began dating model Vanessa Kay Haydon at his father's suggestion. The couple married on November 12, 2005, at his father's Mar-a-Lago estate in Palm Beach, Florida; the service was officiated by Trump Jr.'s aunt, Judge Maryanne Trump Barry. Haydon's grandfather was Danish jazz musician Kai Ewans. They have five children: daughter Kai Madison (b. May 2007), son Donald John III (b. February 2009), son Tristan Milos (b. October 2011), son Spencer Frederick (b. October 2012), and daughter Chloe Sophia (b. June 2014). The oldest daughter, Kai, is named after her maternal great-grandfather, Kai Ewans. Kai Trump was introduced by her father and spoke at the 2024 Republican National Convention on July 17.

On March 15, 2018, media announced the couple had separated and Haydon had filed for an "uncontested" divorce in the Manhattan Supreme Court, despite later revelations that the divorce was, in fact, contested; court records only listed the title of the case, while details regarding the nature of the complaint were never made public. On February 22, 2019, Trump Jr. and Haydon announced they had settled their divorce at the end of 2018.

In 2018, Trump Jr. started dating Kimberly Guilfoyle, a long-time friend of the Trump family. The couple were said to have become engaged on December 31, 2020 (Trump Jr.'s 43rd birthday); however, news of the engagement was not made public until January 2022. Trump Jr. and Guilfoyle mutually ended their engagement sometime in 2024.

In December 2021, Trump Jr. changed his official residency from New York to Florida, 2 years after his father, Donald Trump, had done the same.

In December 2025, Trump Jr.'s engagement to socialite Bettina Anderson was announced. The couple legally married in West Palm Beach, Florida, on May 21, 2026, ahead of a private wedding celebration in the Bahamas on May 23, 2026.

=== Hunting ===
Trump Jr. is an enthusiastic hunter. Controversy erupted in 2012 when the pictures he had taken of his hunting trophies in 2010 were published, including by Mia Farrow, who reposted them in 2015 and 2019. Trump Jr. responded by saying "I'm not going to run and hide because the peta [sic] crazies don't like me". In one photo, Trump Jr. has his arms around a dead leopard; in another, he is holding a knife in one hand and a bloody elephant tail in the other. Although the hunt was legal, anti-hunting activists criticized him. At least one sponsor dropped his father's television show The Celebrity Apprentice. On Earth Day in 2017, Trump Jr. legally hunted prairie dogs in Montana with GOP Congressional candidate Greg Gianforte.

ProPublica revealed on December 11, 2019, that the government of Mongolia retroactively granted Trump Jr. a hunting permit for the endangered Argali mountain sheep. The sheep hunt and travel to Ulaanbaatar for a private meeting with Mongolian president Khaltmaagiin Battulga cost U.S. taxpayers $76,859.36 for United States Secret Service protection, according to two Freedom of Information Act requests by the Citizens for Responsibility and Ethics in Washington (CREW). Humane Society International wildlife vice president Teresa Telecky said, "For trophy hunters to travel to Mongolia to kill a beautiful and endangered ram is an absolute outrage".

In February 2020, Trump Jr. agreed to go on a hunting trip in Alaska with the winner of a fundraising auction for Safari Club International. He also regularly visits Yukon Territory, Canada, for hunting.

In February, 2025, Trump Jr. was accused of killing a protected duck while hunting in the Venice lagoon. A video of a hunting trip in northern Italy that was published by the Italian newspaper Corriere del Veneto showed Trump Jr with the body of a rare ruddy shelduck (Tadorna ferruginea), a species protected throughout Europe by the EU birds directive and by Italian law.

== See also ==
- Business projects of Donald Trump in Russia
- Mueller report
- Timeline of Russian interference in the 2016 United States elections
  - Timeline of Russian interference in the 2016 United States elections (July 2016 – election day)
- Timeline of investigations into Donald Trump and Russia
