= Ike Kaveladze =

Georgian-American business executive (born 1965)

Irakly "Ike" Kaveladze
- Born: 1965 (age 59–60); Georgian SSR, USSR
- Occupations: Senior Vice President, Crocus Group

Irakly "Ike" Kaveladze (Georgian: ირაკლი კაველაძე) is a Georgian-American business executive. He is senior vice president at Crocus Group, the real estate development company run by Aras Agalarov. He was one of eight people attending a meeting with Donald Trump's election campaign officials in June 2016. According to his attorney, Kavaladze is a long-time U.S. citizen and has "never had any engagement with the Russian government in any capacity."

Kaveladze was born in the Soviet republic of Georgia in 1965. He graduated from the Moscow Finance Academy in 1989 and worked for Aras Agalarov as a messenger. Kaveladze moved to the United States in 1991 to pursue a degree at Baruch College, though his website says he received an MBA from the University of New Haven in 2002. Around that time, he set up International Business Creations (IBC), a company that opened bank accounts with Citibank of New York and the Commercial Bank of San Francisco for companies incorporated in Delaware for Russian brokers. In 1996, Kaveladze set up Euro-American Corporate Services Inc. whose services included incorporating companies in Delaware for Russian brokers and setting up bank accounts for them. A money laundering investigation in 2000 revealed that Kaveladze had created corporations without knowing who owned them and that more than $1.4 billion had been moved through their accounts. In response to a 2020 senate report that mentioned this investigation, a lawyer from the firm representing Kaveladze stated that it "does nothing more than reiterate decades-old claims of money laundering that have been consistently denied and debunked and which, despite extensive investigations, resulted in no finding of any illegality whatsoever."

On June 9, 2016, he was present at a meeting in Trump Tower between three people associated with the Donald Trump campaign—Donald Trump Jr., Jared Kushner, and Paul Manafort—and several other people including Russian attorney Natalia Veselnitskaya. The meeting had been proposed by Azerbaijani singer Emin Agalarov and his father, Moscow-based oligarch Aras Agalarov, Kaveladze's employer. Kaveladze attended the meeting as a representative of the Agalarov family and to serve as an interpreter if necessary, according to his attorney.

== See also ==
- Russian interference in the 2016 United States elections
