= Kai Ewans =

Danish and American jazz reedist (1906–1988)

- Born: Kai Peter Anthon Nielsen; 10 April 1906; Hørsholm, Denmark
- Died: 4 April 1988 (aged 81); Connecticut, U.S.
- Style: Jazz
- Relatives: Vanessa Trump (granddaughter); Kai Trump (great-granddaughter)

Kai Peter Anthon Ewans (né Nielsen; 10 April 1906 – 4 April 1988) was a Danish and American jazz reedist.

== Life and career ==
=== Music ===
Ewans was born in Hørsholm, Denmark in 1906. He played initially as a banjoist, but switched to saxophone in 1923 when he formed the Blues Jazz Band. The group disbanded in 1924, after which Ewans was with Valdemar Eiberg's ensemble from 1924 to 1926. He adopted the name Ewans in 1927, and led Denmark's first big band in 1927–1928, thereafter leading bands in Belgium and Germany through 1931. Following this he played with Bernard Etté, Kai Julian (1931–1932), and Erik Tuxen (1932–1936). He founded a new band including mostly musicians from Tuxen's ensemble in 1936, and recorded with Benny Carter that year. The band recorded in the 1940s. AllMusic wrote: "Ewans was a potent force behind the development of interest in jazz, and in particular in big band, swing-era-style music in Denmark. His bands were reportedly disciplined, well-rehearsed and enthusiastic outfits, reflecting the best qualities of the leader."

=== Business ===
The big band dissolved in 1947, and after this Ewans worked in business in the U.S., moving to California in 1956. From 1960 to 1964 he ran a restaurant with Carter in Beverly Hills and later in the decade returned to Copenhagen to play again.

== Retirement and death ==
He retired to Connecticut late in life, and died there on 4 April 1988, six days shy of his 82nd birthday.

== Family ==
His granddaughter, Vanessa Trump, was married to Donald Trump Jr., President Donald Trump's eldest son.

Kai Trump, Vanessa’s daughter and hence his great-granddaughter, is named after him.

== See also ==
- Danish jazz
- Trump family
- List of Danish Americans
- List of people from Denmark
