= Louisiana's 52nd House of Representatives district =

American legislative district

Louisiana's 52nd State House of Representatives district
Representative
Jerome Zeringue; R–Houma

Louisiana's 52nd House of Representatives district is one of 105 Louisiana House of Representatives districts. It is currently represented by Republican Jerome Zeringue of Houma.

== Geography ==
HD52 includes part of the city of Houma, alongside its adjacent district of 53.

== Election results ==
Year	Winning candidate	Party	Percent	Opponent	Party	Percent
2011	Gordon Dove	Republican	100%			
2015	Jerome Zeringue	Republican	50% (Note: Raw votes - 5,049)	J.J. Buquet	Republican	50% (Note: Raw votes - 5,043)
2019	Jerome Zeringue	Republican	100%			
2023	Jerome Zeringue	Republican	Cancelled			
