= Tanner Magee =

American lawyer and politician (born 1980)

Speaker pro tempore of the Louisiana House of Representatives
- In office January 13, 2020 – January 8, 2024
- Preceded by: Walt Leger
- Succeeded by: Michael T. Johnson

Member of the Louisiana House of Representatives from the 53rd district
- In office January 11, 2016 – January 8, 2024
- Preceded by: Lenar Whitney
- Succeeded by: Jessica Domangue

Personal details
- Born: Tanner Daniel Magee; July 1980 (age 45–46) Houma, Louisiana, U.S.
- Party: Republican
- Spouse: Kristen Magee
- Children: 3
- Education: Louisiana State University (BA, JD)

Tanner Daniel Magee (born July 1980) is a criminal defense lawyer from downtown Houma in Terrebonne Parish in south Louisiana, who is served as a Republican member of the Louisiana House of Representatives for District 53. On January 11, 2016, he succeeded fellow Republican Lenar Whitney, whom he unseated in the runoff election held on November 21, 2015. He was re-elected in the primaries on October 12, 2019, having no challengers. On January 13, 2020 he became Speaker pro tempore of the Louisiana House of Representatives, a position he held until 2024.

== Political career ==
In the primary election held on October 24, 2015, Magee led Lenar Whitney by nine votes, 3,073 (34.35 percent) to her 3,064 (34.25 percent). The lone Democratic candidate, Brenda Leroux Babin, polled the remaining but critical 2,809 ballots (31.4 percent). In the second round of balloting in conjunction with the victory of the Democrat John Bel Edwards as governor over United States Senator David Vitter, Magee toppled Whitney, 4,978 votes (60.8 percent) to 3,206 votes (39.2 percent). A particularly conservative politician, Whitney was among the defeated candidates in the 2014 race for Louisiana's 6th congressional district seat, won by another Republican, Garret Graves, who succeeded Bill Cassidy, a physician who was instead elected to the other U. S. Senate previously held by the New Orleans Democrat Mary Landrieu.

District 53 encompasses Broadmoor, Lisa Park, Old Houma, East Houma, Bourg, Montegut, Point-Aux-Chenes, and Chauvin. Early in 2016, Magee joined a 76-28 House majority to support legislation by Representative Katrina Jackson, a Democrat from West Monroe, that increases the state sales tax by one cent over eighteen months, beginning April 1, 2016. It was later increased to twenty-seven months to extend through June 30, 2018. Joining Magee in support of the bill were area lawmakers Democrat Jerry "Truck" Gisclair of Larose and Republican Jerome Zeringue of Houma. Voting against the bill were his area colleagues, Independent Dee Richard of Thibodaux in Lafourche Parish and Republican Beryl Amedee of Gray in Terrebonne Parish.

On July 12, 2022, Magee announced that he was running for Louisiana Circuit Courts of Appeal District 1, Division D, but was defeated in the November 8 general election by Lafourche Parish district judge Stephen Miller.

Louisiana House of Representatives
Preceded by Lenar Whitney	Member of the Louisiana House of Representatives from the 53rd district 2016–2024	Succeeded by Jessica Domangue
Preceded by Walt Leger	Speaker pro tempore of the Louisiana House of Representatives; 2020–2024	Succeeded by Michael T. Johnson
