= 2024 Republican National Convention =

U.S. political event held in Milwaukee, Wisconsin

- 2024 presidential election

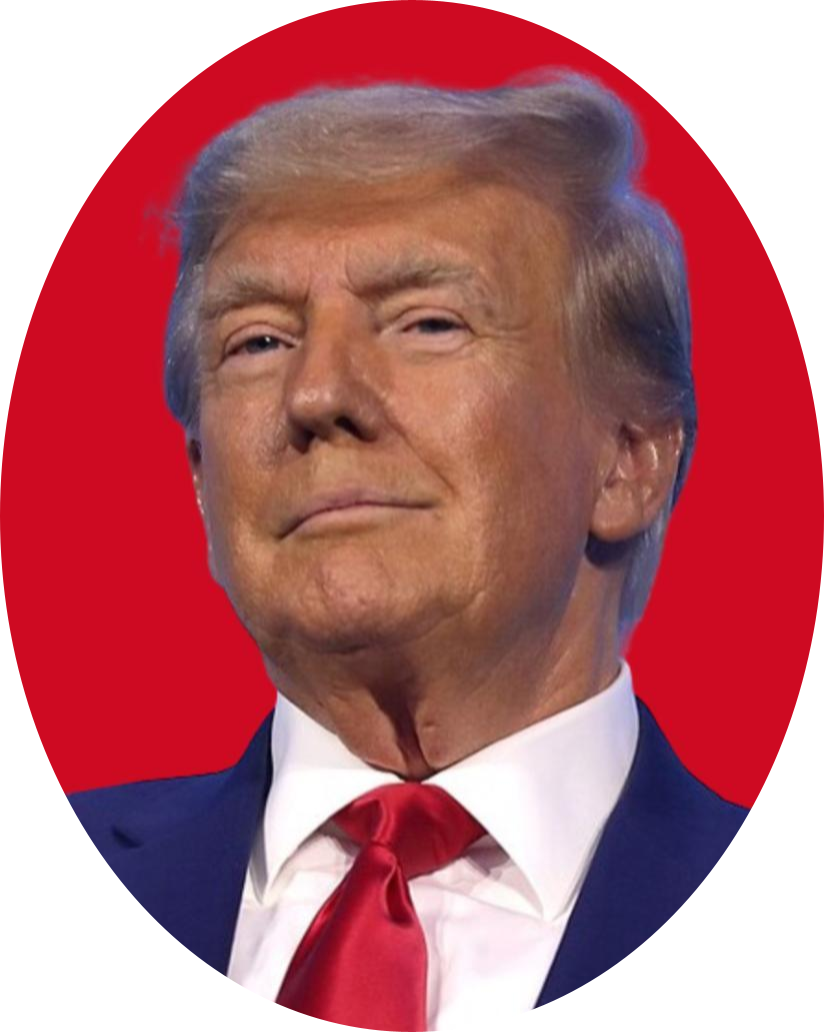
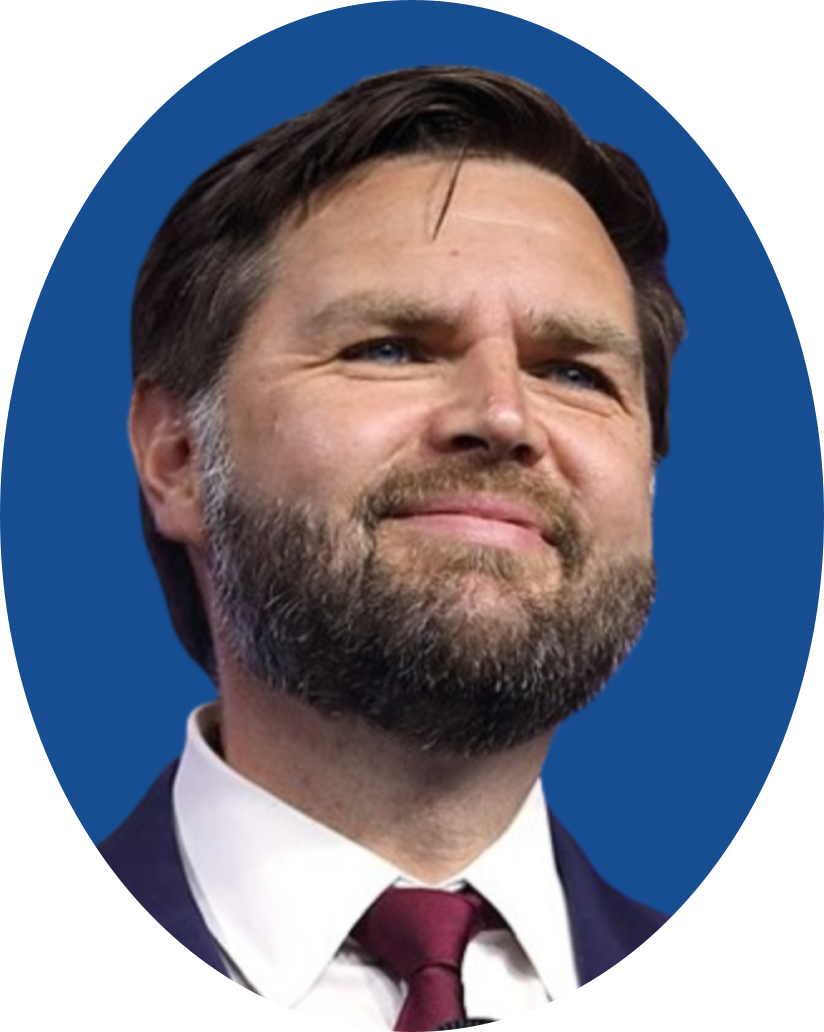
- Nominees; Trump and Vance

Convention
- Dates: July 15–18, 2024
- City: Milwaukee, Wisconsin
- Venue: Fiserv Forum
- Chair: Mike Johnson
- Notable speakers: List: Marjorie Taylor Greene Tucker Carlson Charlie Kirk Nikki Haley Ron DeSantis Tim Scott Marco Rubio Ted Cruz Eric Johnson Ben Carson Mike Pompeo Marsha Blackburn Bill Lee Glenn Youngkin Sarah Huckabee Sanders Doug Burgum Greg Abbott Kari Lake Jim Justice Donald Trump Jr. Eric Trump Lara Trump Matt Gaetz Newt Gingrich Byron Donalds Nancy Mace Brenna Bird Trent Conaway Dana White Sean O'Brien David O. Sacks Amber Rose Savannah Chrisley Hulk Hogan Kai Trump

Candidates
- Presidential nominee: Donald Trump of Florida
- Vice-presidential nominee: JD Vance of Ohio

Voting
- Total delegates: 2,429
- Votes needed for nomination: 1,215
- Results (president): Trump (FL): 2,388 (98.31%) (Note: Although the Chair announced that Trump had received 2,387 votes, the total number of votes cast by the States' delegations for Trump during the roll call actually adds up to 2,388.); Haley (SC): 41 (1.68%)
- Results (vice president): Vance (OH): Acclamation

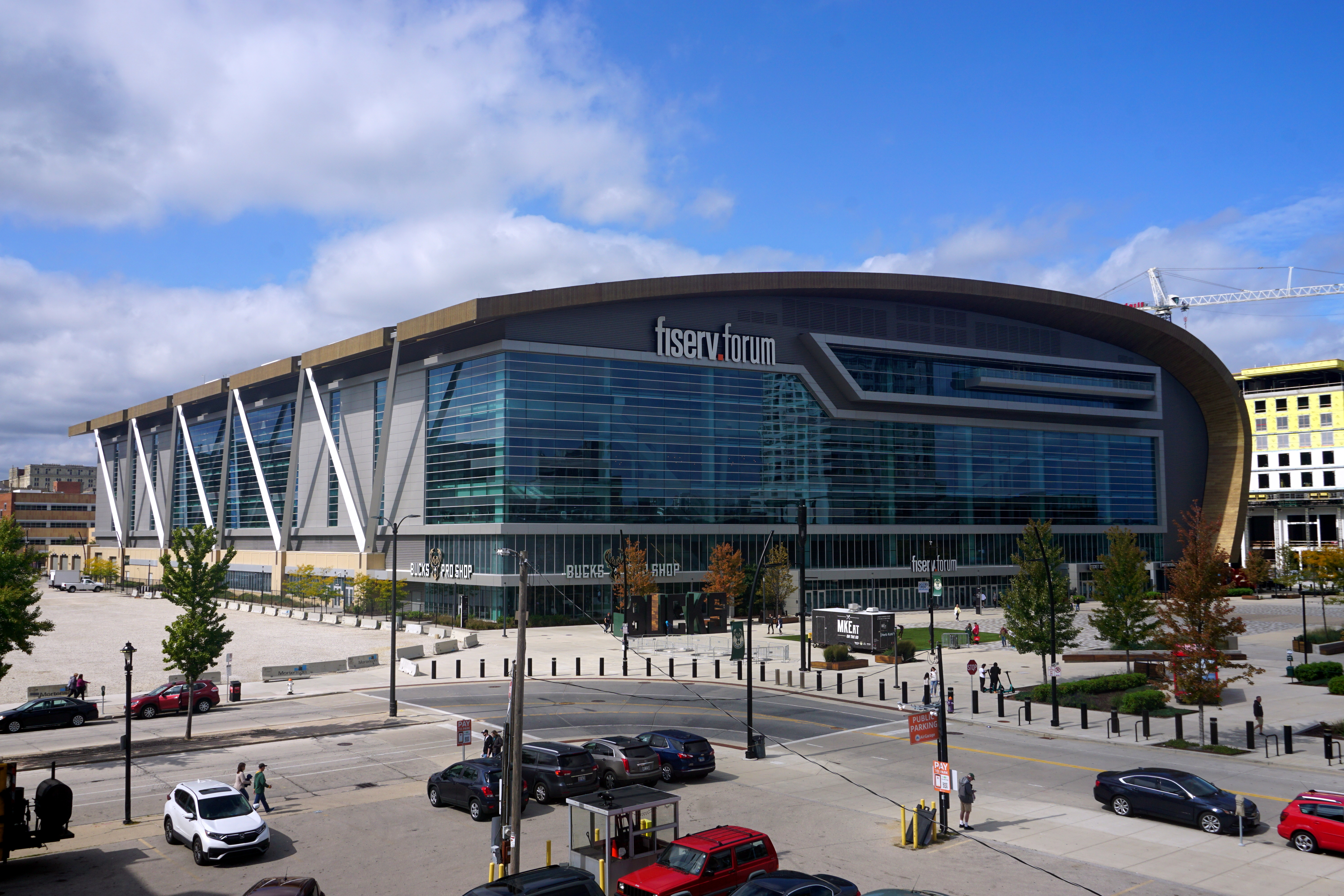
The Fiserv Forum in Milwaukee, Wisconsin, is the venue of the convention's general sessions

The 2024 Republican National Convention was an event in which delegates of the United States Republican Party selected the party's nominees for President of the United States and Vice President of the United States in the 2024 United States presidential election. Held from July 15 to 18, 2024, at Fiserv Forum in Milwaukee, Wisconsin, it preceded the 2024 Democratic National Convention, which took place from August 19 to 22 at United Center in Chicago, Illinois. By March 12, 2024, Trump had won enough delegates during the primaries to become the Republican Party's presumptive nominee.

The convention began two days after an attempted assassination of Donald Trump in Pennsylvania. Trump accepted his party's nomination on July 18, becoming the second Republican to be nominated three times for president—after Richard Nixon in the 1960, 1968, and 1972 conventions—and the first Republican to receive three consecutive presidential nominations. JD Vance, the junior United States senator from Ohio, accepted the party's nomination for vice president. Trump and Vance went on to win the 2024 election, defeating the Democratic ticket of incumbent vice president Kamala Harris and Minnesota governor Tim Walz.

== Logistics ==
=== Site selection ===
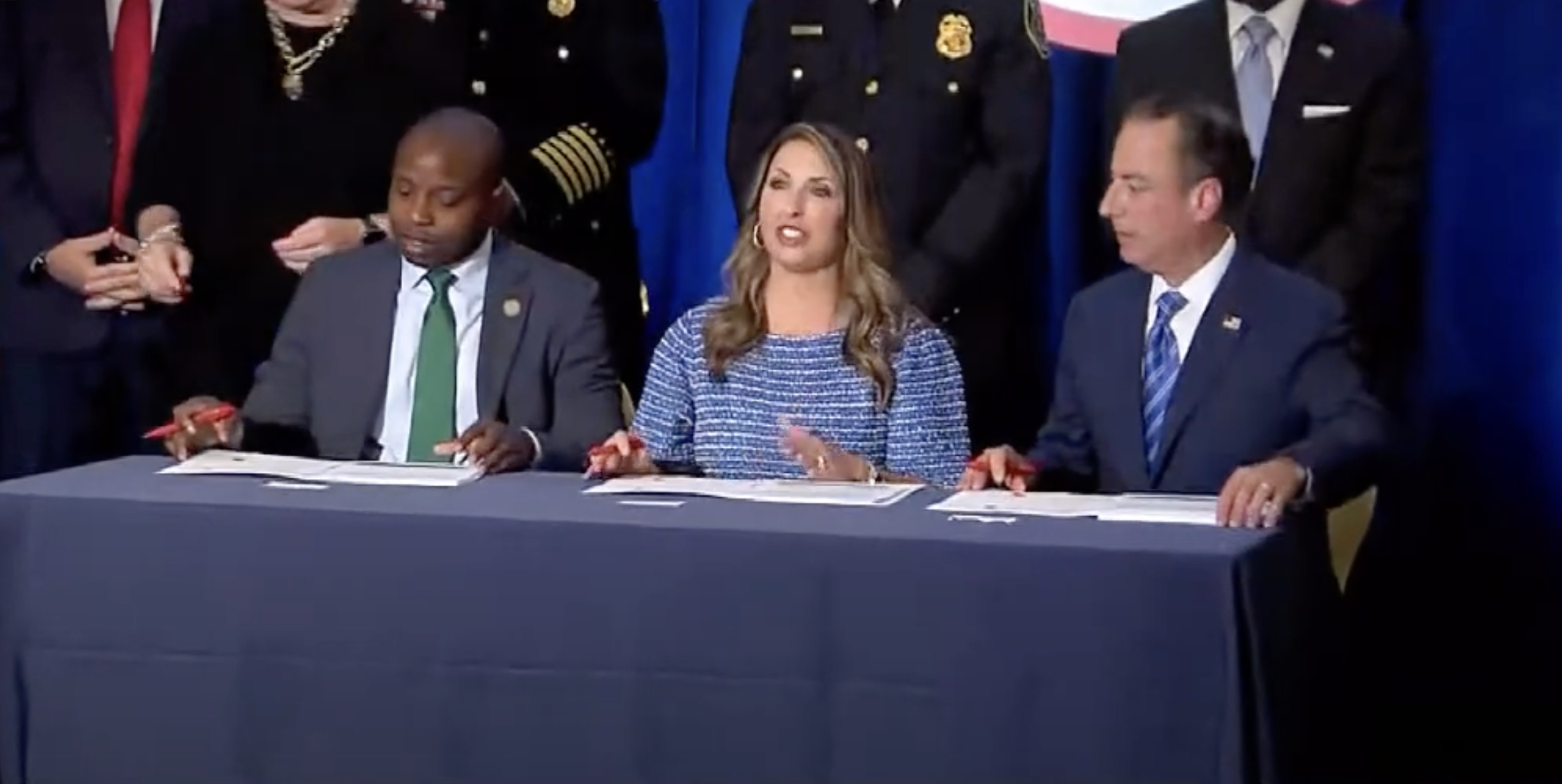
Hosting agreement being signed by (left to right) Milwaukee Mayor Cavalier Johnson, Republican Party Chair Ronna McDaniel, and Host Committee Chair Reince Priebus on August 5, 2022

On January 7, 2022, a spokesperson for the Republican National Committee said that four potential host cities were in the running to be selected for the 2024 convention: Milwaukee, Nashville, Pittsburgh and Salt Lake City. Milwaukee was officially the host city for the 2020 Democratic National Convention, which was largely held virtually in assorted locations with Milwaukee only assuming the role of a production headquarters due to the COVID-19 pandemic. Milwaukee and Pittsburgh are both located in key swing states (Wisconsin and Pennsylvania, respectively) that had both played a significant role in determining the winner of the Electoral College in the 2024 election, while Nashville and Salt Lake City are both the respective state capitals of Tennessee and Utah, which have been reliably Republican states throughout most of the previous half-century (even though the capital cities themselves are considered Democratic strongholds within their states). From 2008 through the 2020 election, both the Democratic Party and Republican Party had only held their conventions in swing states. Houston had previously taken steps towards bidding, but decided against it due to conflicts with other scheduled events at venues. Other locations that had, at one point, an interest in hosting, but which ultimately did not bid, included Columbus, Las Vegas, San Antonio, and the state of Georgia. Kansas City, Missouri, had made a formal bid, but withdrew their bid in late December 2021, prior to the finalist cities being named.

On February 4, 2022, Pittsburgh's bid committee announced that their bid had been eliminated from further consideration. In early March 2022, Salt Lake City was eliminated by the Republican National Committee, leaving Milwaukee and Nashville as the two remaining finalist bid cities. The Metropolitan Council of Nashville and Davidson County voted against a draft hosting agreement, which effectively forfeited the city's bid.

On July 15, 2022, a site selection committee unanimously voted to recommend Milwaukee as the site of the convention over Nashville. This is because of how crucial Wisconsin would be in the 2024 Presidential election. The Republican National Committee voted for Milwaukee to be the party's 2024 convention host during its early August 2022 meeting in Chicago.

Milwaukee is the first city to host major party conventions in consecutive elections since New York City hosted both the 1976 and 1980 Democratic National Conventions. However, the 2024 convention is set to be Milwaukee's first time hosting a normal in-person presidential nominating convention, since the 2020 convention was held with a "virtual" format.

Bidding cities
City	State	Status of bid	Venue	Previous major party conventions
Milwaukee	Wisconsin	Winner	Fiserv Forum	Democratic: 2020 (Note: The 2020 Democratic National Convention was held across parts of the United States amid the impact of the COVID-19 pandemic, but was officially centered in Milwaukee.)
Nashville	Tennessee	Finalist (eliminated in August 2022)	Presumably Bridgestone Arena or Music City Center	—N/a
Salt Lake City	Utah	Finalist (eliminated in March 2022)	Vivint Arena	—N/a
Pittsburgh	Pennsylvania	Finalist (eliminated in February 2022)	Presumably PPG Paints Arena or David L. Lawrence Convention Center	—N/a
Kansas City	Missouri	Non-finalist (withdrawn in December 2021)	T-Mobile Center	Democratic: 1900; Republican: 1928, 1976

On December 21, 2022, the Republican National Committee announced that the convention's dates will be July 15–18, 2024.

The event was anticipated to potentially bring 50,000 visitors to Milwaukee. An estimate showed that it brought in as much as $200 million in revenue to the region.

In terms of population, Milwaukee is smaller than other metropolitan areas that have hosted recent major party conventions. Milwaukee is among the smallest metropolitan areas to have hosted a major party convention. Due to Milwaukee's location being in a swing state, it made a huge impact both economically and politically.

On April 11, 2023, it was announced that Chicago had been selected to host the 2024 Democratic National Convention. Milwaukee and Chicago are approximately 90 miles apart on the coast of Lake Michigan. This is a highly unusual proximity for two different cities hosting major party conventions in the same year. Not since 1972, when both conventions last shared a host city, have the sites of the two major party convention sites been so closely located.

=== Host committee ===
Host committee logo

Reince Priebus is serving as the chairman of the MKE 2024 Host Committee. From September 2022 until May 2023, the host committee's chief executive officer (CEO) was Stephen B. King. In May 2023, it was announced that Milwaukee businessman Ted Kellner would be replacing King as CEO, but that King would remain a member of the Host Committee.

The convention's host committee aimed to raise $65 million to fund the convention. Donors included WinRed, Turning Point USA, General Motors, and the American Beverage Association.

=== Committee on Arrangements ===
Working with the host committee on behalf of the Republican National Committee is convention's Committee on Arrangements. On March 24, 2023, Anne Hathaway was appointed chairwoman of the committee and Ron Kaufman was appointed general chairman. Elise Dickens was named as chief executive officer on June 1, 2023. On June 29, 2023, further committee members were announced, including KC Crosbie as treasurer, Vicki Drummond as secretary, and David Bossie as co-chair. Other members of the committee that were announced included Maripat Krueger, Brian Schimming, and Tom Schreibel.

=== Hotels and other accommodations ===
Milwaukee and its immediate metro area have a smaller number of hotel rooms than can be needed for a major party presidential nominating convention. As a result of this, the 2020 Democratic National Convention, before plans changed due to the COVID-19 pandemic, was originally expected to house a large share of convention delegates in hotel rooms located in Illinois. However, due to the fact that Republican conventions have fewer total delegates than Democratic conventions, it has been reported that the plans for the 2024 Republican Convention do not entail such far-flung accommodations for delegates. Some visitors for the 2020 Democratic Convention were originally anticipated to stay in Madison, Wisconsin. Madison, Wisconsin's visitors bureau have confirmed that, when Milwaukee city was bidding, Milwaukee officials inquired with them about Madison's hotel availability around the time of the convention.

To accommodate convention visitors, the host committee is working with a Chicago-based firm to secure hotel rooms in more than 300 hotels and motels located within a 60-mile radius of the convention site.

In addition to hotels, the original plans for the 2020 Democratic Convention in the city had dormitories at Milwaukee-area universities and colleges accommodating some convention guests and volunteers. Similarly, dorm rooms are expected to be utilized as accommodations during the 2024 Republican National Convention. Marquette University has adjusted their academic calendar to allow for the availability of their dorms during the convention.

=== Security ===
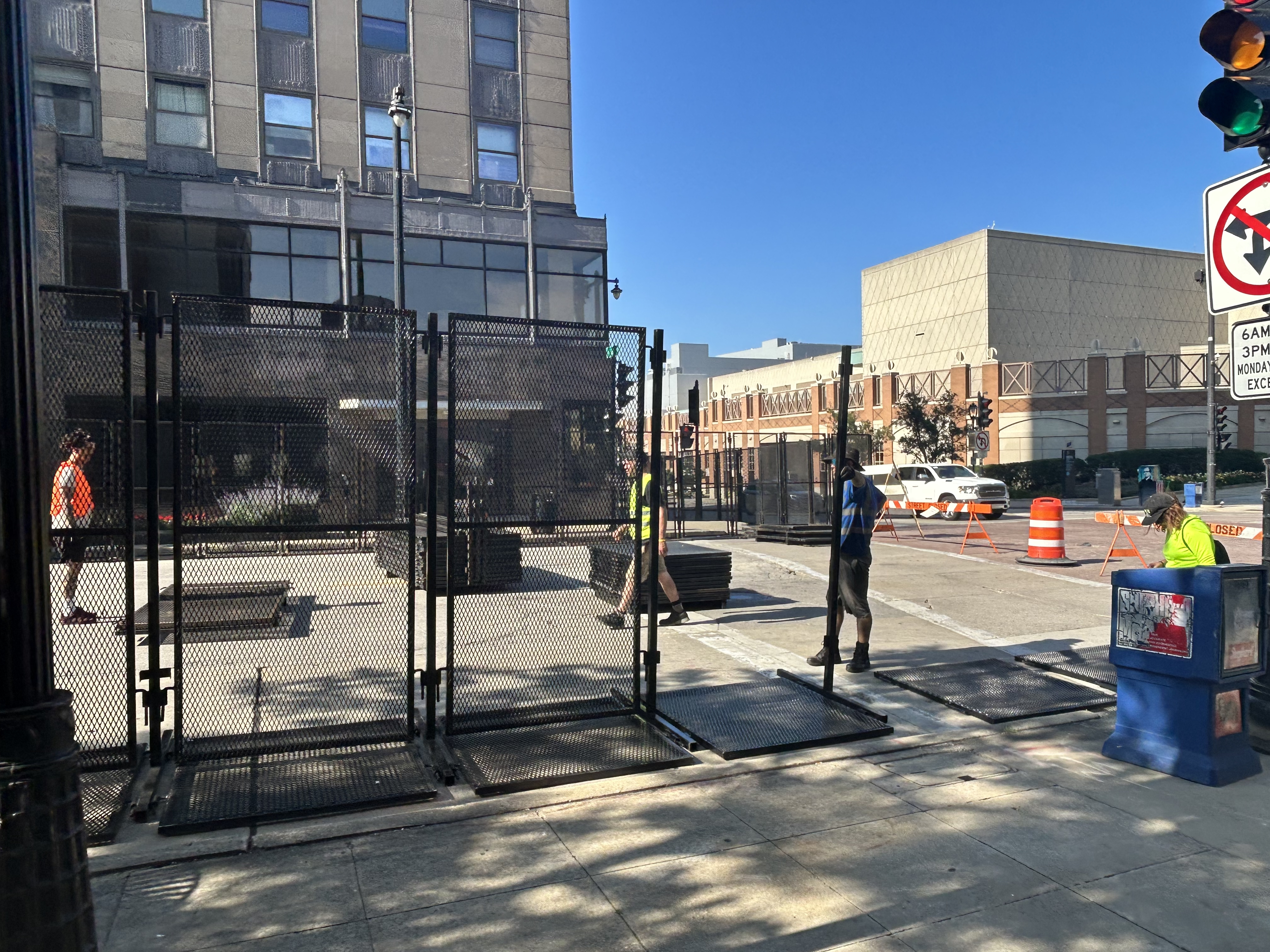
Temporary fencing being erected near the Baird Center ahead of the convention

The convention was a National Special Security Event. With the exception of the downscaled 2020 conventions, each presidential election since 2004 has seen $50 million in grants allocated to each convention host city for security costs. In early 2023, the eight Wisconsin members of the United States House of Representatives wrote a letter to the House Appropriations Committee's Subcommittee on Commerce, Justice, Science urging that the amount allocated for security at each convention be increased to $75 million for the 2024 election. Security for the Republican National Convention was increased due to the consistent threats facing Trump.

In April 2023, Milwaukee Mayor Cavalier Johnson stated that he believed the considerations that should inform security plans for the 2024 Republican National Convention should include the original security plans for a full-scale 2020 Democratic National Convention in the city and input for the U.S. Secret Service. He also stated that the security plans should reflect the political climate, noting the January 6, 2021, United States Capitol attack.

As of April 2023, it was estimated that security for the Republican National Committee could necessitate 4,500 police officers from agencies outside of Milwaukee Police Department. This number is 1,500 greater than the number of outside police officers that had originally been expected in the plans for a full-scale 2020 Democratic National Convention in the city.

Acting upon a request by Milwaukee Police Chief Jeffrey Norman, in May 2023, the Milwaukee Fire and Police Commission has approved a suspension lasting from July 12 through July 26, 2024, of the city 15-day policy for the release of bodycam footage. The 6–3 vote of the Milwaukee Fire and Police Commission to authorize this was held in closed session without public comment. This move received criticism from community activists. The ACLU of Wisconsin published an opinion opposing the suspension of the policy.

Following the attempted assassination of Donald Trump, it was announced that the security perimeter would expand to create buffer zones around the event.

== Schedule ==
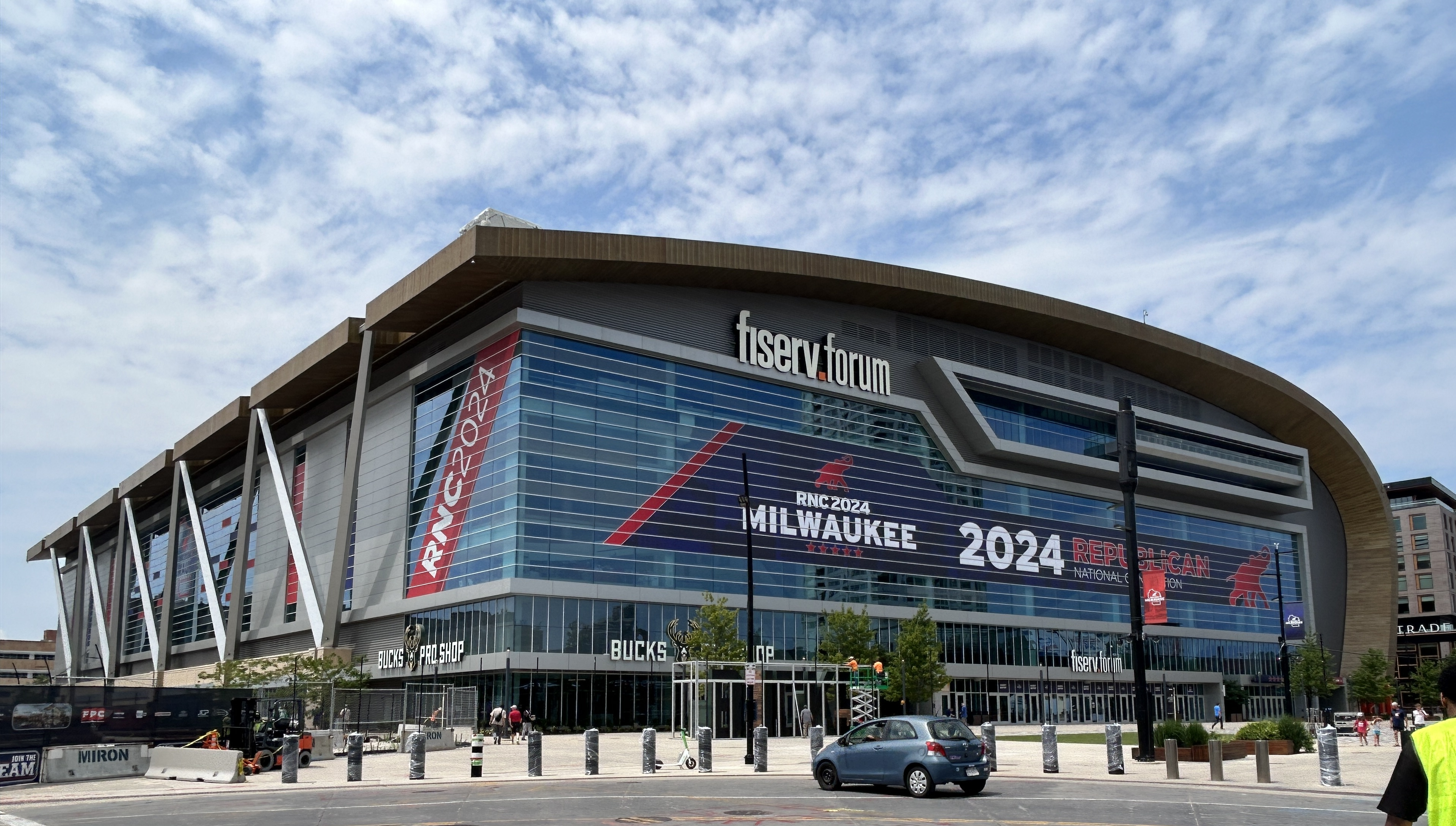
Exterior of the Fiserv Forum, decorated for the convention

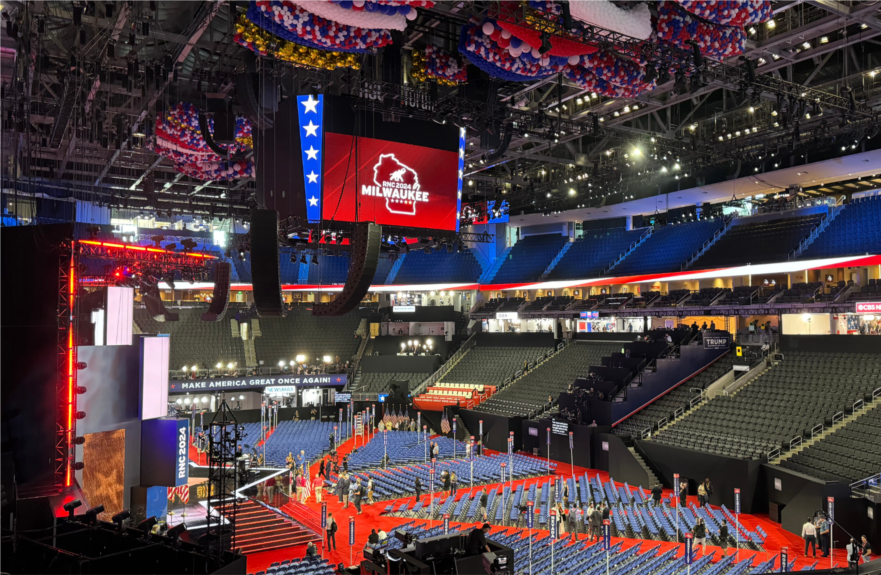
Fiserv Forum, as set up for the convention

The theme for July 15 was "Make America Wealthy Once Again," focusing on the economy.

The theme for July 16 was "Make America Safe Once Again," centering on crime and illegal immigration.

The theme for July 17 was "Make America Strong Once Again," highlighting national security and foreign policy.

The theme for July 18 was "Make America Great Once Again," to conclude the convention.

The absence of a speech by Melania Trump marked a break from the decades-long practice of spouses of presidential nominees speaking at major party conventions.

== Platform ==
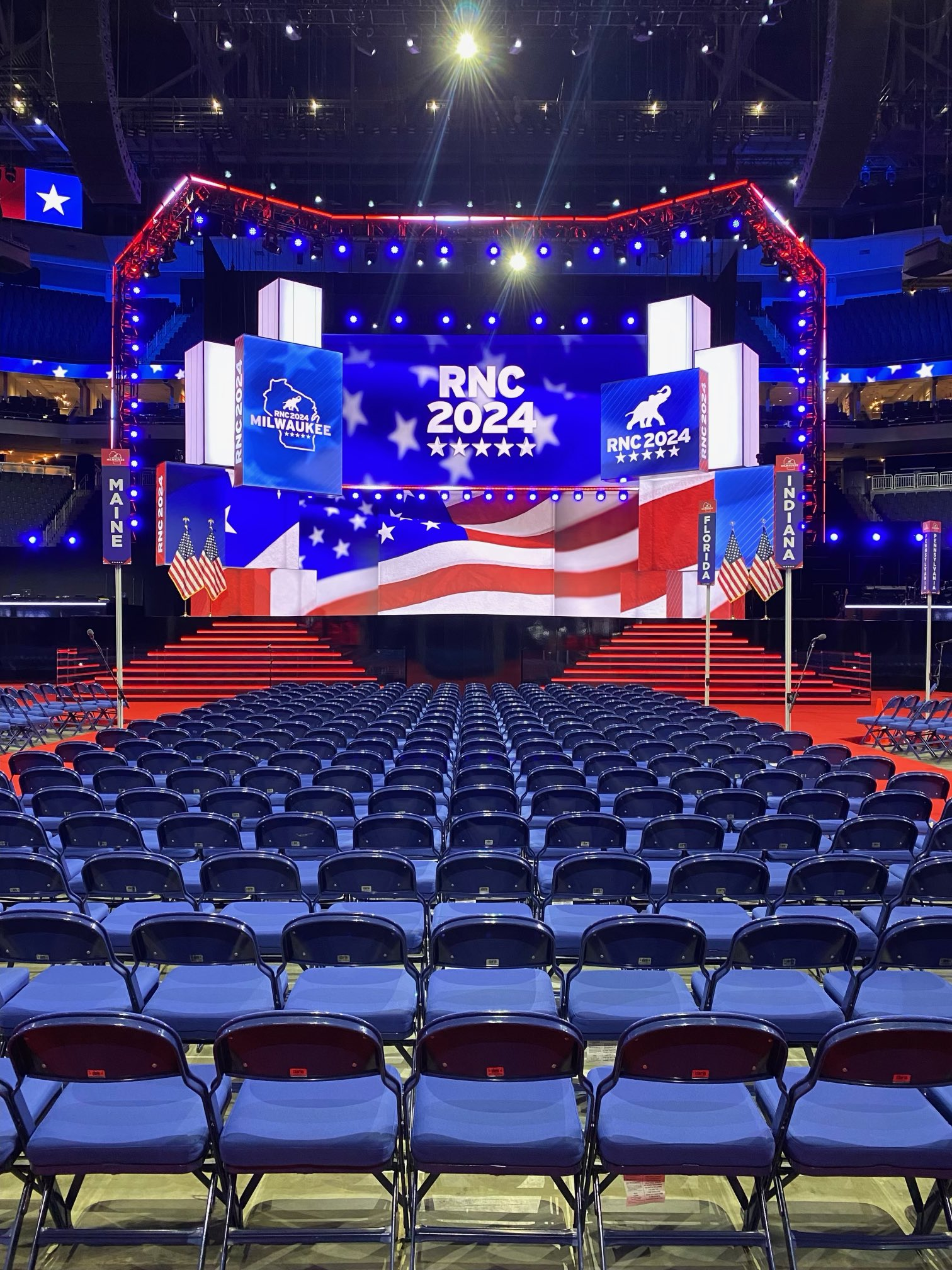
Fiserv Forum's arena floor, as setup for the convention

The 2020 Republican National Convention did not produce a new platform, instead reusing the 2016 platform and producing a document affirming support for Trump.

On July 8, 2024, the Republican National Committee Platform Committee, led by Randy Evans, Russ Vought, and Ed Martin, adopted "Donald J. Trump's 2024 Republican Party Platform".

In May 2024, it was reported in the media that the Trump campaign wanted to shift the platform positions on abortion and same-sex marriage. In June 2024, The New York Times reported that the Trump campaign also wanted to significantly shorten the platform, focusing on contrasting with the Democratic Party instead of providing extensive details on policy. Trump has a separate, but similar, platform called Agenda 47.

Reportedly, the platform was drafted by Trump's campaign directly, and was approved without deliberation or amendments by the delegates unlike in prior years.

The first draft was described by The New York Times as "more nationalistic, more protectionist, and less socially conservative".

After the Republican platform was released, The Washington Post noted that the platform contained numerous paraphrases and direct quotes from Trump's speeches and Truth Social posts from his 2024 campaign, which is unlike previous major U.S. political party platforms.

=== Table of contents ===
The platform has 20 sections of content.

- Two sections on immigration
- Four sections on the economy, energy, and taxes
- One on civil liberties
- One on foreign policy and the military
- One on government
- One on crime
- One on "rebuilding our cities"
- Another one on the military
- Another on economics
- One on entitlements
- One on eliminating electric vehicle tax credits
- One on education
- One on transgender athletes
- One on "pro-Hamas" protests on college campuses
- One on elections
- Conclusion of uniting the country "by bringing it to new and record levels of success"

=== Notable provisions ===
The platform is 16 pages long, significantly less than the 60-page platform in 2016.

The platform removes opposition to same-sex marriage and drops calls for a national ban on abortion, instead saying abortion policy should be left to the states. It implies, but does not state, personhood begins before birth. "We believe that the 14th Amendment to the Constitution of the United States guarantees that no person can be denied Life or Liberty without Due Process, and the States are, therefore, free to pass Laws protecting those Rights," says the document in a section titled Republicans Will Protect and Defend a Vote of the People, from within the States, on the Issue of Life. Several anti-abortion activists had asked Trump to make the document more explicit prior to the convention, but dropped a formal protest after Trump's assassination attempt.

The platform calls for the deportation of millions of "Illegal Aliens" and "sealing the border". It supports tariffs on imports to the United States and removes support for statehood for Puerto Rico. The platform also proposes ending the Department of Education, but protecting Social Security and Medicare.

The term "common sense" appears twelve times in the document.

== Nominating and balloting ==
=== Background on the Republican Party's nomination rules ===
In 1972, in order to prevent an anti-Vietnam War televised nominating speech for Representative Pete McCloskey of California, who had earned one delegate to the Republican National Convention in the presidential primaries, the party changed its rules so that a candidate could not get on to the floor of the convention in order to have their name officially placed in nomination with fewer than 25 delegates, whereas previously only one had been required. In 2012, the Republican party rules were changed to require a candidate to have a majority of delegate votes in at least eight states as a prerequisite to having their name officially be placed into nomination at the convention.

The last time more than one candidate's name was officially placed into nomination at the convention floor to be the Republican Party's nominee for President was at the 1976 Republican National Convention.

=== Trump's official nomination and seconding speeches ===
Former President Trump's name was placed into nomination by Jeff Kaufmann, chairman of the Iowa Republican Party.

Michael McDonald, the chairman of the Nevada Republican Party, seconded his nomination.

=== Delegate count ===
The table below reflects the presumed delegate count as per the end selection process and the final tally at the convention.

As a courtesy to their followers, candidates who had suspended their campaigns usually formally withdraw shortly before the start of the convention after the deadline to replace them, thereby allowing their delegates to attend.

However, the delegations of some (but not all) states, territories, and the District of Columbia are required by convention rules to cast their votes in accordance with the results of the primaries, even if it means voting for a candidate who has already withdrawn.

In addition to these, there were also 51 unbound delegates who are not bound by the results of state primaries or caucuses.

=== Results by candidate ===
Delegates' allocation
Candidate	Delegates at the end of delegate selection	Final vote as per roll-call
Donald Trump	2,268	2,388
Nikki Haley	97	41 (Note: The Chair did not announce how many votes Haley had received.) (Note: Haley released her delegates before the convention, encouraging them to vote for Trump. However, 41 delegates remained bound by the rules of their State's Republican Party to support her.)
Ron DeSantis	9	0 (Note: Iowa law binds delegates to certain candidates, unless only one name is entered into nominations at the convention (as happened in 2024), in which case they are bound to support the nominee.)
Vivek Ramaswamy	3	0 (Note: Iowa law binds delegates to certain candidates, unless only one name is entered into nominations at the convention (as happened in 2024), in which case they are bound to support the nominee.)
Undeclared (Note: Includes all unpledged delegates who had not declared which candidate they would have supported at the Convention.)	51	N/A
Total	2,429	

=== Results by state or territory ===
State or territory	Delegates	Votes cast for Donald Trump	Votes cast for Nikki Haley
Alabama	50	50	0
Alaska	29	29	0
American Samoa	9	9	0
Arizona	43	43	0
Arkansas	40	40	0
California	169	169	0
Colorado	37	37	0
Connecticut	28	28	0
Delaware	16	16	0
Washington, D.C.	19	0	19
Florida	125	125	0
Georgia	59	59	0
Guam	9	9	0
Hawaii	19	19	0
Idaho	32	32	0
Illinois	64	64	0
Indiana	58	58	0
Iowa	40	40	0
Kansas	39	39	0
Kentucky	46	46	0
Louisiana	47	47	0
Maine	20	20	0
Maryland	37	37	0
Massachusetts	40	40	0
Michigan	55	51	4
Minnesota	39	39	0
Mississippi	40	40	0
Missouri	54	54	0
Montana	31	31	0
Nebraska	36	36	0
Nevada	26	26	0
New Hampshire	22	22	0
New Jersey	12	12	0
New Mexico	22	22	0
New York	91	91	0
North Carolina	74	62	12
North Dakota	29	29	0
Northern Marianas	9	9	0
Ohio	79	79	0
Oklahoma	43	43	0
Oregon	31	31	0
Pennsylvania	67	67	0
Puerto Rico	23	23	0
Rhode Island	19	19	0
South Carolina	50	50	0
South Dakota	29	29	0
Tennessee	58	58	0
Texas	161	161	0
Utah	40	40	0
Vermont	17	17	0
Virginia	48	42	6
Virgin Islands	4	4	0
Washington	43	43	0
West Virginia	32	32	0
Wisconsin	41	41	0
Wyoming	29	29	0
Total	2,429	2,388	41

== Vice presidential nomination ==
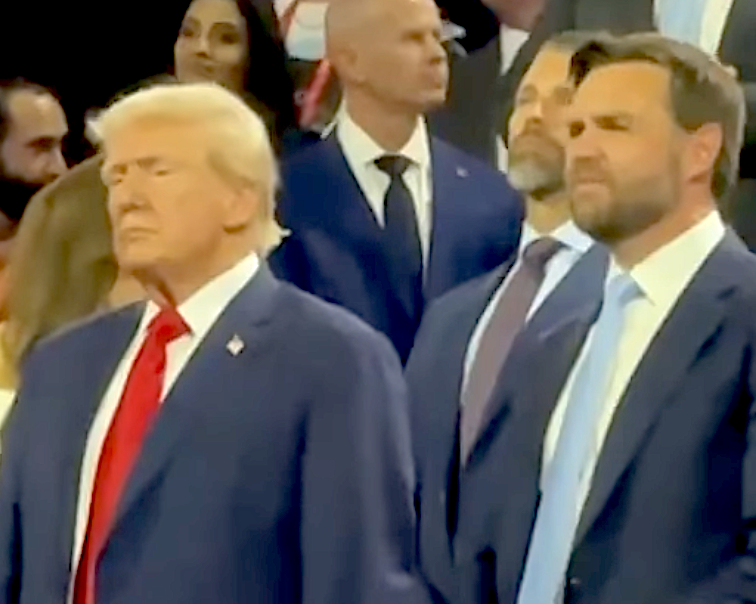
Trump and Vance standing together during the first night of the convention

On July 15, the first day of the Republican National Convention, Trump announced JD Vance as his nominee for vice president.

Vance was placed into nomination by Ohio Lieutenant Governor Jon Husted. U.S. Senate candidate Bernie Moreno of Ohio moved for the nomination to be approved by acclamation, at which point House Speaker Mike Johnson proclaimed Trump and Vance the official nominees. Vance greeted convention guests alongside his wife, Usha Vance, after being introduced.

In the 1988 Republican National Convention, in order to prevent opposition to the nomination of Dan Quayle, the rules were changed to permit the vice presidential nomination by acclamation. This method has since become traditional.

== Featured speakers ==
=== Day one: Monday, July 15 ===
Theme: Make America Wealthy Once Again

==== Afternoon business session ====
Speaker	Position/Notability
Mike Johnson	56th Speaker of the United States House of Representatives; Leader of the House Republican Conference; U.S. Congressman from Louisiana's 4th congressional district

==== Evening session ====
For the rest of the convention, the agenda consists of motivational speakers. Among these are:

Speaker	Position/Notability
Michael Whatley	Chair of the Republican National Committee
Ron Johnson	United States Senator from Wisconsin
Marjorie Taylor Greene	U.S. Congresswoman from Georgia's 14th congressional district
Mark Robinson	35th Lieutenant Governor of North Carolina; Republican nominee for Governor in the 2024 gubernatorial election
Wesley Hunt	U.S. Congressman from Texas's 38th congressional district
John James	U.S. Congressman from Michigan's 10th congressional district
Katie Britt	United States Senator from Alabama
Tim Scott	United States Senator from South Carolina; 2024 Republican presidential candidate
Glenn Youngkin	74th Governor of Virginia
Bob Unanue	CEO of Goya Foods
Kristi Noem	33rd Governor of South Dakota
Byron Donalds	U.S. Congressman from Florida's 19th congressional district
David Sacks	Former CEO of Yammer
Charlie Kirk	CEO of Turning Point USA
Marsha Blackburn	United States Senator from Tennessee
Primetime
Amber Rose	Model; Rapper
Sean M. O'Brien	President of the International Brotherhood of Teamsters

=== Day two: Tuesday, July 16 ===
Theme: Make America Safe Once Again

Notable speakers on day two included:

Speaker	Position/Notability
Bill Lee	50th Governor of Tennessee; Chairman of the Republican Governors Association
Reince Priebus	Former White House Chief of Staff; Former Chair of the Republican National Committee
Perry Johnson	Entrepreneur; 2024 Republican presidential candidate
Kari Lake	Republican candidate in the 2024 United States Senate election in Arizona; Republican nominee for Governor in the 2022 gubernatorial election in Arizona
Eric Hovde	Republican nominee in the 2024 United States Senate election in Wisconsin
Bernie Moreno	Republican nominee in the 2024 United States Senate election in Ohio
Mike Rogers	Republican nominee for the 2024 United States Senate election in Michigan; Former United States Congressman from Michigan's 8th congressional district
David McCormick	Republican nominee in the 2024 United States Senate election in Pennsylvania
Jim Justice & Babydog	36th Governor of West Virginia (Justice); Republican nominee in the 2024 United States Senate election in West Virginia (Justice); His dog (Babydog)
Jim Banks	United States Congressman from Indiana's 3rd congressional district Republican nominee in the 2024 United States Senate election in Indiana
Sam Brown	Republican nominee in the 2024 United States Senate election in Nevada
Tim Sheehy	Republican nominee in the 2024 United States Senate election in Montana
Hung Cao	Republican nominee in the 2024 United States Senate election in Virginia
Rick Scott	United States Senator from Florida
Jeff Van Drew	United States Congressman from New Jersey's 2nd congressional district
Elise Stefanik	Chair of the House Republican Conference; United States Congresswoman from New York's 21st congressional district
Tom Emmer	House Majority Whip; United States Congressman from Minnesota's 6th congressional district
Steve Scalise	House Majority Leader; United States Congressman from Louisiana's 1st congressional district
Mike Johnson	56th Speaker of the United States House of Representatives; Leader of the House Republican Conference; U.S. Congressman from Louisiana's 4th congressional district
Vivek Ramaswamy	Entrepreneur; 2024 Republican presidential candidate
Savannah Chrisley	Reality TV star
Eric Johnson	Mayor of Dallas
Ted Cruz	United States Senator from Texas; 2016 Republican presidential candidate
Brenna Bird	34th Attorney General of Iowa
Nikki Haley	Former United States Ambassador to the United Nations; 2024 Republican presidential candidate
Ron DeSantis	46th Governor of Florida; 2024 Republican presidential candidate
Eric Schmitt	United States Senator from Missouri
Tom Cotton	United States Senator from Arkansas
Primetime
Sarah Huckabee Sanders	47th Governor of Arkansas; Former White House Press Secretary
Ben Carson	Former United States Secretary of Housing and Urban Development; 2016 Republican presidential candidate
Marco Rubio	United States Senator from Florida; 2016 Republican presidential candidate
Lara Trump	Co-chair of the Republican National Committee; Daughter-in-law of Donald Trump

=== Day three: Wednesday, July 17 ===
Theme: Make America Strong Once Again

Speaker	Position/Notability
Brian Mast	United States Congressman from Florida's 21st congressional district
Nancy Mace	United States Congresswoman from South Carolina's 1st congressional district
Ronny Jackson	United States Congressman from Texas's 13th congressional district
Richard Grenell	Former acting director of national intelligence
Matt Gaetz	United States Congressman from Florida's 1st congressional district
Callista Gingrich	Former ambassador to the Holy See; Wife of former Speaker Newt Gingrich
Newt Gingrich	Former Speaker of the United States House of Representatives; 2012 Republican presidential candidate
Peter Navarro	Former director of the U.S. Office of Trade and Manufacturing Policy
Monica De La Cruz	United States Congresswoman from Texas's 15th congressional district
Thomas Homan	Former acting director of Immigration and Customs Enforcement
Greg Abbott	48th Governor of Texas
Trent Conaway	Mayor of East Palestine, Ohio
Doug Burgum	33rd Governor of North Dakota; 2024 Republican presidential candidate
Kellyanne Conway	Former Trump aide
Anna Paulina Luna	United States Congresswoman from Florida's 13th congressional district
David Bellavia	Medal of Honor recipient, co-founder of Vets for Freedom
Kimberly Guilfoyle	TV Host; Fiancée of Donald Trump Jr.
Michael Waltz	United States Congressman from Florida's 6th congressional district
Shabbos Kestenbaum	Jewish activist and Harvard Divinity School alumnus
Lee Zeldin	Former United States Congressman from New York's 1st congressional district Republican nominee in the 2022 New York gubernatorial election
Primetime (Note: NBC began airing the convention an hour before the other networks, beginning with Waltz's speech.)
Kai Trump	Daughter of Donald Trump Jr.
Donald Trump Jr.	Son of Donald Trump
Usha Vance	Lawyer and wife of Senator JD Vance
JD Vance	United States Senator from Ohio; Republican nominee for vice president in the 2024 presidential election

=== Day four: Thursday, July 18 ===
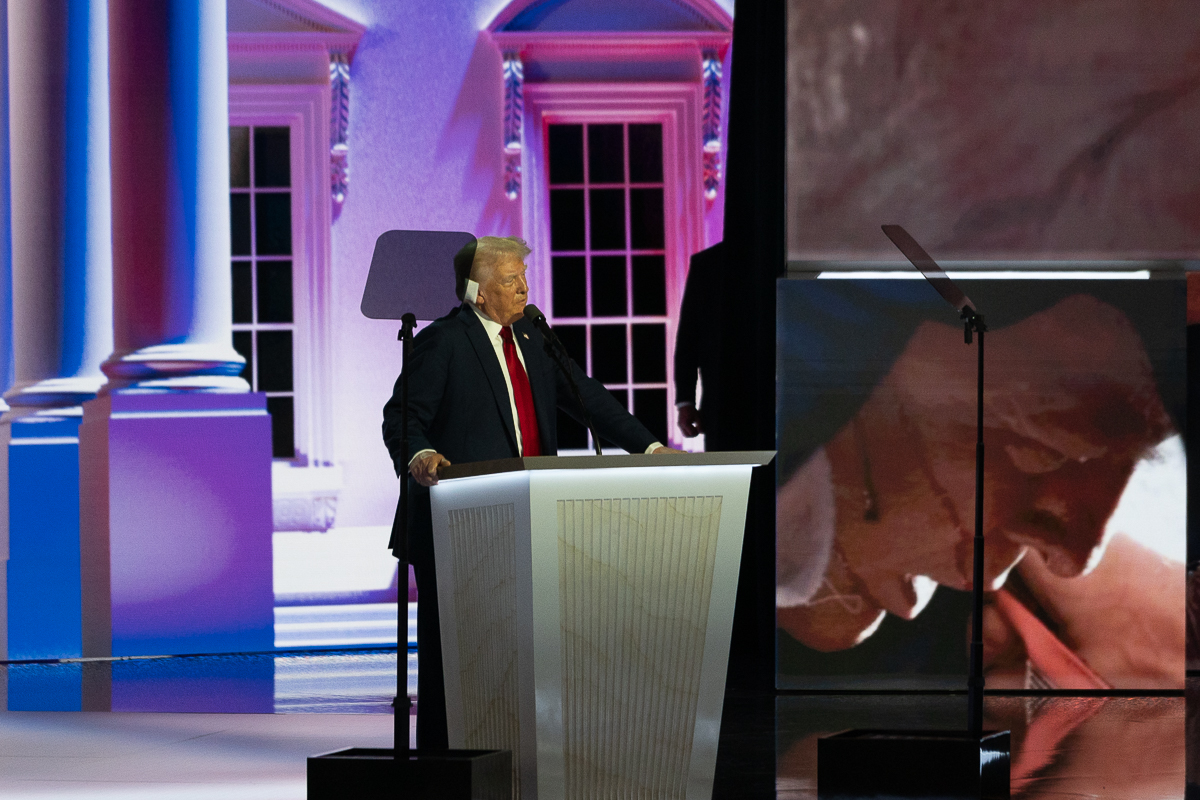
Trump delivering his acceptance speech

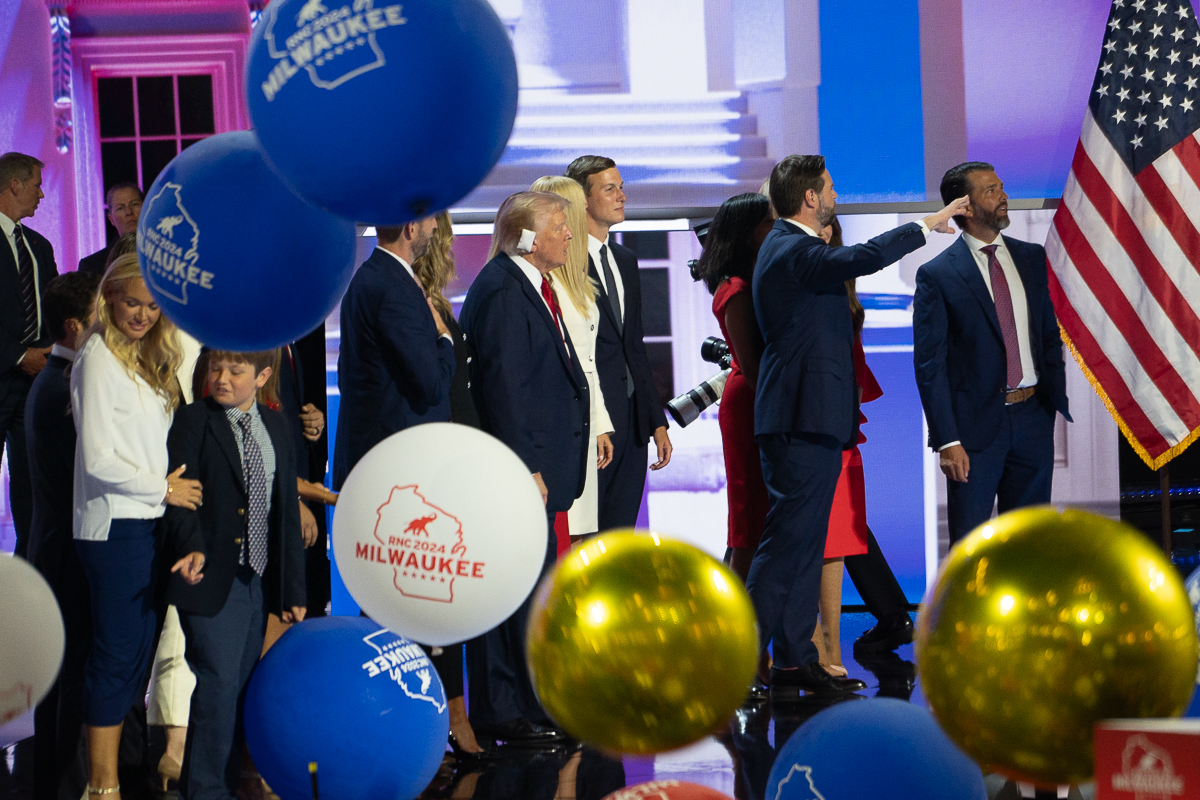
Trump, Vance, and their families on stage at the close of the convention

Theme: Make America Great Once Again

Speaker	Position/Notability
Steve Daines	United States Senator from Montana Chairman of the National Republican Senatorial Committee
Richard Hudson	United States Congressman from North Carolina's 9th congressional district Chairman of the National Republican Congressional Committee
Diane Hendricks	Businesswoman
Linda McMahon	Former Administrator of the Small Business Administration
Mike Pompeo	Former United States Secretary of State
Lorenzo Sewell	Pastor
Steve Witkoff	Real estate investor
Alina Habba	Legal spokesperson for Donald Trump
Tucker Carlson	Television host and commentator
Hulk Hogan	Retired professional wrestler
Franklin Graham	Evangelist
Eric Trump	Son of Donald Trump
Primetime
Dana White	President of the Ultimate Fighting Championship
Donald Trump	Republican nominee for president in the 2024 presidential election Former President of the United States

== See also ==
- 2024 Republican Party presidential primaries
- 2024 Democratic National Convention
- Republican Party of Wisconsin
- 2024 Green National Convention
- 2024 Libertarian National Convention
- 2024 Constitution National Convention

== Notes ==
Preceded by 2020; Charlotte, North Carolina and other locations	Republican National Conventions	Succeeded by 2028; Houston, Texas
