= Michael T. Johnson =

American politician

Michael Johnson

Speaker pro tempore of the Louisiana House of Representatives
- Incumbent
- Assumed office January 8, 2024
- Preceded by: Tanner Magee

Member of the Louisiana House of Representatives from the 27th district
- Incumbent
- Assumed office January 13, 2020
- Preceded by: Lowell Hazell

Personal details
- Born: Pineville, Louisiana, U.S.
- Party: Republican
- Education: Louisiana Christian University (BA); Southern University (JD)

Michael T. Johnson is an American politician who has served as a member of the Louisiana House of Representatives as a member of the Republican Party since 2019 and serves as Speaker pro tempore since 2024.

== Biography ==
Johnson graduated from Pineville High School in 1977, Louisiana College in 1981, and the Southern University Law Center in 1984. He was elected to the Louisiana House of Representatives in 2019.

Louisiana House of Representatives
Preceded by Tanner Magee	Speaker pro tempore of the Louisiana House of Representatives; 2024–present	Incumbent
