= Kai Trump =

American social media personality (born 2007)

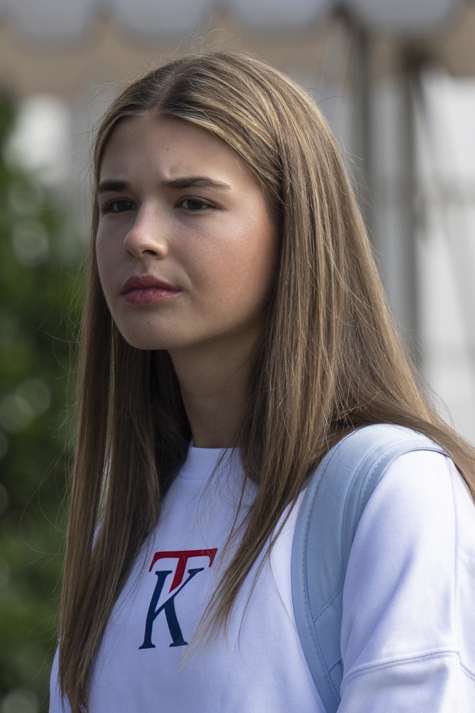
- Trump in 2025
- Born: Kai Madison Trump; May 12, 2007 (age 19); New York City, U.S.
- Education: The Benjamin School, University of Miami (attending)
- Occupations: Tiktoker; YouTuber; Internet personality; Golfer; Influencer
- Known for: Eldest granddaughter of Donald Trump; Influencer
- Parents: Donald Trump Jr. (father); Vanessa Trump (mother)
- Relatives: Trump family Kai Ewans (great-grandfather)

TikTok information
- Page: Kai Trump
- Followers: 3.8 million

YouTube information
- Channel: Kai Trump
- Genre: Vlogging
- Subscribers: 1.52 million
- Views: 228,621,797
- Last updated: August 11, 2026

Kai Madison Trump (born May 12, 2007) is an American social media personality and golfer. A member of the Trump family, she is the eldest child of Donald Trump Jr. and Vanessa Trump and the eldest grandchild of U.S. president Donald Trump. She gained a national profile after giving a speech in support of her grandfather's presidential candidacy at the 2024 Republican National Convention.

== Early life ==
Kai Madison Trump was born on May 12, 2007, in New York City. She is the first child of Donald Trump Jr. and Vanessa Haydon, and the first grandchild of Donald Trump and Ivana Zelníčková. She is named after her great-grandfather, Kai Ewans, a jazz reedist from Denmark. She is the eldest of five siblings. Kai has German, Scottish, Czech, Italian, Swedish and Danish ancestry.

Trump graduated from The Benjamin School in Palm Beach Gardens, Florida, on May 15, 2026.

== Golf ==
Kai is a competitive golfer and has played for The Benjamin School in Palm Beach Gardens. She won the 2022 Women's Club Championship and the 2024 Ladies Club Championship at Trump International Palm Beach, where she recorded a competitive handicap of +0.5.

In March 2025, Trump competed in the Junior Invitational. She finished 24th out of 24 participants.

Kai accepted an invitation to make her debut on the LPGA Tour in November 2025, at The Annika sponsored by Annika Sörenstam. She shot rounds of 83 and 75 to finish last in a field of 108, and missed the cut.

She has verbally committed to play collegiate golf as a member of the Miami Hurricanes women's golf 2026 signing class at the University of Miami in Coral Gables, Florida.

== Branding and endorsements ==
As of February 2025, Trump reportedly had a name, image, and likeness valuation of $1.2 million, with sponsors including Callaway Golf Company and TaylorMade Golf.

Trump collaborated on the drink Blue Raz Slush with the Accelerator Active Energy beverage company. The drink sold out in record time for Accelerator.

== Politics ==
Trump with her grandfather while he speaks with White House press in September 2025

Trump gave a speech at the 2024 Republican National Convention in Milwaukee, focusing on her relationship with her grandfather. In the speech, she characterized him as "just a normal grandpa" and called him an inspiration. John Mulholland, the former Guardian US editor, called the speech "part of a politically calculated makeover" while political commentator and regular CNN contributor Van Jones said that "The granddaughter came out and opened up our hearts" and said that she did a good job of humanizing Donald Trump and making him appear likeable.

== Social media ==
Following her appearance at the RNC in July 2024, Trump's Instagram follower count rose from 125,000 to 185,000 followers in less than 24 hours, and her account had more than 333,000 followers by the end of July.

Trump received significant attention for vlogging the celebration of Donald Trump's victory in the 2024 United States presidential election and for saying that Elon Musk had "attained uncle status" on November 10 following his extensive support of Donald Trump's campaign.

As of July 23, 2026, her YouTube channel has 1.51 million subscribers, her account on TikTok has 3.7 million followers, her account on Instagram has 2.7 million followers, and her account on X has 906,800 followers. Following the election, she was highlighted as a potentially important influencer in improving Donald Trump's popularity among the young, and a powerful ally on social media.

During the 2026 Iran war, she posted a YouTube video entitled "I Brought My Secret Service to Erewhon," one of the most expensive grocery store chains in the United States. The video was criticized by The Guardian columnist Marina Hyde, The Lincoln Project, and general social media commenters as tone-deaf.
