= Lenar Whitney =

American politician

Republican National Committeewoman from Louisiana
- In office March, 2012 – April 6, 2024 Serving with Roger Villere
- Succeeded by: Gena Gore

Member of the Louisiana House of Representatives from the 53 district
- In office January 9, 2012 – January 11, 2016
- Preceded by: Damon Baldone
- Succeeded by: Tanner Magee

Personal details
- Born: February 1959 (age 67) Houma, Terrebonne Parish; Louisiana, US
- Party: Republican
- Parent(s): Harris John Ledet (1933–2014); Carlene Boquet Ledet
- Education: Nicholls State University
- Occupation: Businesswoman

Lenar Marie Ledet Whitney (born February 1959) is an American businesswoman from Houma, Louisiana, who is a Republican former member of the Louisiana House of Representatives for District 53 in Terrebonne Parish. She was a member of the Louisiana delegation of the Republican National Committee. Whitney lost her election on Saturday April 6, 2024 for an additional term on the RNC. Whitney was soundly defeated by Gena Gore. Whitney lost her bid for a second term in the runoff election held on November 21, 2015. A year earlier, she had been an unsuccessful candidate in the nonpartisan blanket primary for Louisiana's 6th congressional district seat.

== Background ==
Whitney graduated from Vandebilt Catholic High School in Houma and obtained an associate degree in business from Nicholls State University in Thibodaux, Louisiana. Since she was sixteen, she has operated a small business. She claims to have sales experience in oil field fabrication, repair and maintenance, and the media and telecommunications. Whitney traces her family tree on the Ledet and Boquet side directly to the Bourg/Montegut's families. Whitney has two children, both graduates of Louisiana State University in Baton Rouge.

== Political career ==
In 2011, Whitney won the right to succeed the term-limited Democrat Damon Baldone by defeating fellow Republican Billy Hebert, a member of the Terrebonne Parish Council, 3,709 (59 percent) to 2,552 (41 percent). District 53 encompasses the Oakshire, Broadmoor, Park Avenue, Bayou Blue, Cocodrie, Montegut, Bourg, and Pointe-aux-Chenes sections of Houma, the parish seat of Terrebonne Parish. Whitney is the first woman to represent Terrebonne in the legislature and the first Republican to hold the District 53 seat. On September 19, 2014, Whitney received the "Outstanding Family Advocate Award" from the Louisiana Family Forum.

Whitney ran in the November 4, 2014, nonpartisan blanket primary for Louisiana's 6th congressional district, being vacated by the physician Bill Cassidy, who was instead challenging Mary Landrieu for the United States Senate. Four of her intraparty opponents were Garret Graves, Trey Thomas, Paul Dietzel, II, grandson of a Louisiana State University football coach and athletic director, and attorney Dan Claitor of Baton Rouge, who in 2009 succeeded Cassidy in the Louisiana State Senate. A Democratic candidate in the running, former Governor Edwin Edwards, led the field in the primary and faces a December 6 runoff election with the second-place candidate, Garret Graves. Whitney finished a distant fifth with 19,146 votes (7.4 percent) of the ballots cast.

=== Campaign controversy ===
On June 25, 2014, Lenar Whitney claimed in a campaign video that human-caused climate change is "the greatest deception in the history of mankind." Dismissing evidence of global warming presented in Al Gore's documentary An Inconvenient Truth and the consensus of scientific opinion that Earth's climate is being affected by human activities, Whitney claimed that in the past ten years the planet "has done nothing but get colder each year." As evidence, Whitney stated "any 10-year-old can invalidate [the theses of climate scientists] with one of the simplest scientific devices known to man: a thermometer." Fact checker website PolitiFact.com ruled that, "There is an overwhelming consensus among respected scientists that human-caused global warming is real, and Whitney's supporting evidence falls flat. We rate this claim Pants on Fire."

Whitney further stated in her campaign video that she attributes the phasing out of high-energy light bulbs in the United States to "progressives" instead of U.S. President George W. Bush, who signed that law. Whitney also stated that she believes that "many Middle East countries" want to "blow the United States off the face of the Earth," using funds from selling petroleum to the United States, citing no evidence.

Nonpartisan analyst David Wasserman of The Cook Political Report called Whitney "the most frightening candidate I've met in seven years interviewing congressional hopefuls." Wasserman reported that while interviewing her on July 23, 2014, he asked Whitney for the source of her claim that the earth is getting colder. "She froze and was unable to cite a single scientist, journal, or news source to back up her beliefs." When Whitney was asked if she doubted the Hawaiian birthplace of U.S. President Barack Obama, her campaign consultants pulled her from the interview and thereafter called Wasserman's attitude "belittling". Wasserman said, "It was the first time in hundreds of Cook Political Report meetings that a candidate has fled the room." Whitney later claimed that Wasserman attacked her: "It was obvious, from the onset of the interview, that Wasserman had planned to jump me simply because I am a conservative woman ... liberal shills like [him] want to destroy us." Steve Benen, producer of The Rachel Maddow Show, commented, "A tip for candidates everywhere: if you literally run away from questions, you’re doing it wrong."

=== 2015 reelection defeat ===
Whitney's congressional race may have negatively impacted her prospects for holding on to her state House seat for a second term. With 3,064 votes (34.25 percent), she fell nine votes short of a plurality in the October 24 primary. The leading candidate was a second Republican candidate, attorney Tanner Magee of Houma, who received 3,073 votes (34.35 percent). Holding the key to victory was the Democratic candidate, Brenda Leroux Babin, who polled 2,809 ballots (31.4 percent).

In the runoff election on November 21 in conjunction with the victory of the Democrat John Bel Edwards as governor, Whitney was handily unseated by Tanner Magee, who polled 4,978 votes (60.8 percent) to her 3,206 votes (39.2 percent).

Louisiana House of Representatives
Preceded by Damon Baldone	Louisiana State Representative for District 53 (Terrebonne Parish); 2012–2016	Succeeded by Tanner Magee
