= Jessica Domangue =

American politician

Member of the Louisiana House of Representatives from the 53rd district
- Incumbent
- Assumed office January 8, 2024
- Preceded by: Tanner Magee

Personal details
- Party: Republican
- Education: Nicholls State University (BS); Louisiana State University (MS)
- Occupation: Licensed Clinical Social Worker

Jessica Domangue is an American politician serving as a member of the Louisiana House of Representatives from the 53rd district. A member of the Republican Party, Domangue has been in office since January 8, 2024.

== Career ==
Jessica Domangue was previously the Chairwoman of the Terrebone Parish Council. She first ran to represent District 53 in 2023 and advanced to the runoff after the October 14, 2023 Jungle primary. In the November 18, 2023 runoff election, she won with 64% against Dirk Guidry's 20%. Domangue has announced her support of term limits.

Candidate	Party	First round		Second round	
Candidate	Party	Votes	%	Votes	%
Jessica Domangue	Republican	3,001	42.80	3,170	51.60
Dirk Guidry	Republican	2,552	36.40	2,973	48.40
Willis Trosclair, Jr.	Republican	1,458	20.80		
Total		7,011	100.00	6,143	100.00
Source: Louisiana Secretary of State
