= List of Claremont McKenna College people =

This list of notable people associated with Claremont McKenna College includes matriculating students, alumni, attendees, faculty, trustees, and honorary degree recipients of Claremont McKenna College in Claremont, California.

== Notable alumni ==
=== Politics ===
| Name | Class year | Notability | Degree | Reference |
|---|---|---|---|---|
| Steve Bullock | Class of 1988 | Governor of Montana (2013–2021); attorney general of Montana (2009–2013); Democrat | B.A. | |
| Todd Achilles | Class of 1990 | Member, Idaho House of Representatives, Democrat (2024-2025); candidate for U.S. Senate (2025-2026), Independent | B.A. | |
| Ken Cheuvront | Class of 1983 | Member, Arizona State Senate; Democrat | B.A. | |
| Patrick J. Conroy | Class of 1972 | 60th chaplain of the United States House of Representatives | B.A. | |
| Chuck DeVore | Class of 1985 | Member, California State Assembly, candidate for U.S. Senate; Republican | B.A. | |
| David Dreier | Class of 1975 | Member of the U.S. House of Representatives from California and chairman of the House Rules Committee; Republican | B.A. | |
| Johnny Ellis | Class of 1982 | Minority leader, Alaska State Senate; Democrat | B.A. | |
| Sean Elsbernd | Class of 1997 | Member, San Francisco Board of Supervisors; Democrat | B.A. | |
| Thomas B. Hofeller | | Political consultant | B.A. | |
| Rob Hurtt | Class of 1966 | California State Senate Republican Leader, 1995–1998 | B.A. | |
| Adam Kokesh | Class of 2006 | Political activist, talk radio host | B.A. | |
| Tom Leppert | Class of 1977 | Former chief executive officer of Kaplan, Inc, mayor of Dallas, Texas (2007–2011) | B.A. | |
| Tyler Olson | Class of 1998 | House member for the 38th district of Iowa | B.A. | |
| Surin Pitsuwan | Class of 1972 | Secretary-general, Association of Southeast Asian Nations, former Thai Minister of Foreign Affairs | B.A. | |
| Mohammad Sabah Al-Salem Al-Sabah | Class of 1978 | Prime minister of the State of Kuwait | B.A. | |
| Simon Salinas | Class of 1978 | Monterey County supervisor, former member of the California State Assembly | B.A. | |

=== Nonprofit ===
| Name | Class year | Notability | Degree | Reference |
|---|---|---|---|---|
| Hugh Gallagher | | Disability advocate, drafted the Architectural Barriers Act of 1968 | B.A. | |

=== Business ===
| Name | Class year | Notability | Degree | Reference |
|---|---|---|---|---|
| Michael Arrington | Class of 1992 | Internet entrepreneur, founder of Techcrunch, co-founder of CrunchFund | B.A. | |
| Chris Innes | Class of 1992 | CEO of Dream America, American Financier | B.A. | |
| Chris Buskirk | | Writer, co-founder of Rockbridge Network and 1789 Capital | B.A. | |
| Sloane Citron | Class of 1978 | Magazine publisher | B.A. | |
| Robert Addison Day | | Former chairman and chief executive officer of Trust Company of the West; chairman and president of the W. M. Keck Foundation | B.A. | |
| Michael S. Jeffries | Class of 1966 | Chairman and CEO of Abercrombie & Fitch Co. | B.A. | |
| Michael Larson | Class of 1980 | Chief investment officer of Cascade Investment, the investment vehicle for the Gates Foundation and the Gates' personal wealth | B.A. | |
| Patrick Lencioni | Class of 1987 | Best-selling management book author, corporate speaker | B.A. | |
| Tom Leppert | Class of 1977 | Former chief executive officer of Kaplan, Inc, mayor of Dallas, Texas (2007–2011) | B.A. | |
| Ashwin Navin | Class of 1999 | President and co-founder of BitTorrent, Inc., founder of The Claremont Independent | B.A. | |
| Augie Nieto | Class of 1980 | Founder of Life Fitness and Augie's Quest | B.A. | |
| Douglas Peterson | Class of 1980 | S&P Global president and CEO | B.A. | |
| Thomas Pritzker | Class of 1972 | Executive chairman, Hyatt Corporation and member of the Pritzker family | B.A. | |
| George R. Roberts | Class of 1966 | Founding partner, Kohlberg Kravis Roberts & Co. | B.A. | |
| Julie Sweet | | Chief executive officer of Accenture | B.A. | |
| Peter Thum | Class of 1990 | Founder of Ethos Water, and social entrepreneur | B.A. | |
| Peter Weinberg | Class of 1979 | CEO of Goldman Sachs 1999–2005, founder of Perella Weinberg Partners | B.A. | |

=== Academia ===
| Name | Class year | Notability | Degree | Reference |
|---|---|---|---|---|
| Orley Ashenfelter | Class of 1964 | Joseph Douglas Green 1895 Professor of Economics at Princeton University; former editor of the American Economic Review | B.A. | |
| Tibor R. Machan | Class of 1965 | Former editor of Reason magazine, Stanford Hoover Institution fellow and professor at Chapman University | B.A. | |
| Vincent Phillip Muñoz | Class of 1993 | Tocqueville Associate Professor of Religion & Public Life in the Department of Political Science at the University of Notre Dame | B.A. | |
| Harriet Nembhard | Class of 1988 | President of Harvey Mudd College, 2023– | | |
| Jack L. Stark | Class of 1957 | Former CMC president | B.A. | |
| Francisco Vázquez | Class of 1972 | Professor and director of the Hutchins School of Liberal Studies at Sonoma State University | B.A. | |

=== Entertainment ===
| Name | Class year | Notability | Degree | Reference |
|---|---|---|---|---|
| Paul Brickman | Class of 1971 | Screenwriter, producer, and filmmaker; directed and wrote the screenplay for Risky Business | B.A. | |
| Mason Gordon | Class of 1997 | Inventor of SlamBall | B.A. | |
| John King | Class of 1986 | Half of the music-producing duo The Dust Brothers | B.A. | |
| Douglas Day Stewart | Class of 1962 | Screenwriter of An Officer and a Gentleman | B.A. | |
| Dean Taylor | Class of 1972 | Vice president of Baseball Operations, assistant general manager of the Kansas City Royals | B.A. | |
| Claire Thomas | Class of 2007 | Food blogger and presenter of Food for Thought on Food Network | B.A. | |

=== Military ===
| Name | Class year | Notability | Degree | Reference |
|---|---|---|---|---|
| William W. Crouch | Class of 1963 | Retired United States Army four-star general; former Vice Chief of Staff of the United States Army | B.A. | |
| Ron Ridenhour | Class of 1972 | My Lai massacre whistleblower, Vietnam War whistleblower | B.A. | |

=== Writing and journalism ===
| Name | Class year | Notability | Degree | Reference |
|---|---|---|---|---|
| David Enrich | Class of 2001 | Reporter, Wall Street Journal | B.A. | |
| Gregg Jarrett | Class of 1977 | Anchor, Fox News Channel | B.A. | |
| Michael D. Shear | Class of 1990 | White House Correspondent, New York Times | B.A. | |

=== Dropouts and transfers ===
| Name | Class year | Notability | Degree | Reference |
|---|---|---|---|---|
| Mike Feuer | N/A | Los Angeles city attorney, former California assemblyman and L.A. city councilman (transferred to Harvard, where he got his BA and JD) | N/A | |
| Blake Gottesman | N/A | Personal aide to President George W. Bush | N/A | |
| Wes Parker | N/A | Baseball player, Los Angeles Dodgers | N/A | |
| Robin Williams | | Actor and comedian | N/A | |

== Notable faculty ==
- William Ascher - Donald C. McKenna Professor of Government and Economics; dean of the faculty 2000–2005; prolific author; winner of the G. David Huntoon, Sr., Award for Superior Teaching
- Fred Balitzer - professor of government; director of the Republican National Committee under President Ronald Reagan, chairman of Scholars for Reagan-Bush in 1984, and special emissary to the Sultan of Brunei; helped bring about diplomatic relations with China and Israel and played a leading role in preventing efforts to make the District of Columbia a state
- Roderic Ai Camp - McKenna Professor of the Pacific Rim; author of 34 books on Mexico and Latin America; founding member of the Advisory Board, Mexico Institute, Woodrow Wilson Center, Smithsonian Institution, 2003–present; elected member of the Council on Foreign Relations, New York; Global Scholar, Woodrow Wilson Center, 2017–present; recipient of the Medal of the Aztec Eagle, the highest honor bestowed to a foreigner for his contributions to Mexico
- Ross Eckert - professor of economics who dedicated his life to cleaning up the blood supply; worked on market-incentives to reduce congestion; worked to rescue the U.S. Laws of the Sea from degradation (deceased)
- Ward Elliott - researched market solutions to Los Angeles smog problem; drafted the economic-incentives of the Clean Air Act Amendments of 1990
- Diane Halpern - former president of the American Psychological Association
- Eric Helland - professor of Economics, senior staff economist, President's Council of Economic Advisers (2003–2004)
- Alan Heslop - government consultant, founding director of the Rose Institute, felon, and former dean of faculty
- Harry V. Jaffa - professor of political philosophy, scholar of the Lincoln-Douglas debates, Aristotelian virtue, and the American founding; The National Review described Jaffa as "the foremost contemporary interpreter of the American political tradition"
- Charles Kesler - editor of the Claremont Review of Books and noted conservative scholar
- Jamaica Kincaid - novelist
- Kenneth P. Miller - professor of Government specializing in California politics, direct democracy, and state constitutional law; associate director of the Rose Institute of State and Local Government
- Jonathan Petropoulos - historian and scholar of Holocaust-era looted art
- Mort Sahl - speechwriter for President John F. Kennedy; famed comedian
- Michael Uhlmann - former assistant attorney general to President Gerald Ford; special assistant to President Ronald Reagan; reportedly convinced Justice Clarence Thomas to join the federal judiciary
