= Lucy Dalglish =

American journalist, attorney, and professor

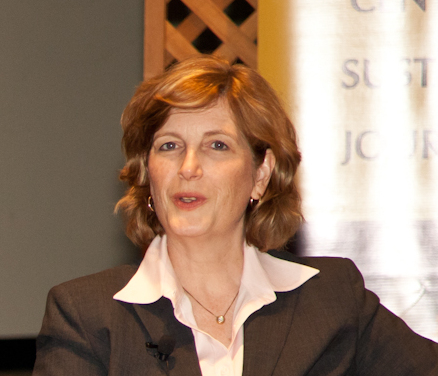
- Dalglish in 2011
- Born: Minneapolis, Minnesota
- Spouse: William Mark McNair (m. 2010)

Academic background
- Education: BA, Journalism, 1980, University of North Dakota; MSL, Yale University; J.D., Vanderbilt University Law School

Lucy Ann Dalglish is an American journalist, attorney, and professor and former dean at the University of Maryland's Philip Merrill College of Journalism.

== Early life, education, and early career ==
Dalglish was born in Minneapolis, Minnesota to parents James and Joanne Speikers Dalglish. She graduated from Grand Forks Central High School in 1977 and enrolled at the University of North Dakota for her Bachelor of Arts degree. Upon graduating in 1980, she worked as a reporter and editor at the St. Paul Pioneer Press for 13 years during which she completed her master of studies in law at Yale University. She earned a juris doctor degree at Vanderbilt University Law School in 1995 and subsequently returned to the Twin Cities to work at Dorsey & Whitney as a trial lawyer specializing in media law.

Dalglish served as the chairwoman of the Society of Professional Journalists' Freedom of Information (FOI) committee from 1992 to 1995 and publicly advocated for First Amendment issues. In 1995, she was honored by SPJ with its Wells Memorial Key for outstanding service to the Society. In 1996, she was also inducted into the National Freedom of Information Act Hall of Fame. In 2000, Dalglish was named the executive director of the Reporters Committee for Freedom of the Press.

== Academic career ==
In 2012, Dalglish was named dean of the University of Maryland, College Park's Philip Merrill College of Journalism. In this role, she oversaw the establishment of the Howard Center for Investigative Journalism and the creation of the George Solomon Endowed Chair in Sports Journalism. Her appointment was extended for a second term in August 2017. In January 2021, her term was extended for an additional year through the 2023 academic year. In 2015, she was named a Fellow of the Society of Professional Journalists. In 2021, she was named the "Administrator of the Year" by the Scripps Howard Foundation and the Association for Educators in Journalism and Mass Communication. In response to the 2021 storming of the United States Capitol, Dalglish argued against the Capitol riot defendants who stated they were journalists. She said they were not journalists due to their lack of credentials and stated that the definition of a "journalist" is not broad enough to protect them in a court of law.

== Personal life ==
Dalglish married William Mark McNair, who is of counsel for the New York law firm Kaplan Fox, in 2010.
