= 1789 Capital =

American venture capital firm

1789 Capital Management, LLC
- Trade name: 1789 Capital
- Type: Private
- Founded: October 3, 2022
- Founder: Omeed Malik; Rebekah Mercer; Chris Buskirk
- Headquarters: Palm Beach, Florida
- Key people: Donald Trump, Jr. (partner)
- AUM: US$2.7 Billion (2026)
- Total assets: US$2.7 Billion (2026)
- Number of employees: 15+ (2025)
- Website: www.1789capital.io

1789 Capital Management, LLC is an American venture capital firm based in Palm Beach, Florida. The company focuses on products and companies associated with conservative values, and positions itself as an anti-ESG investment firm. The firm is a registered investment advisor regulated by the Securities and Exchange Commission.

The company has been criticized over conflicts of interest related to Donald Trump Jr.'s association with the Donald Trump administration., although according to Axios, Trump Jr. does not sit on the investment committee for the firm's growth equity fund and "had no involvement in negotiations with the government on behalf of 1789's portfolio companies," as a spokesperson for DJT Jr noted. Within one year after Trump assumed office, companies backed by 1789 Capital received contracts valued at $735 million from the Trump administration.

As the firm's lawyers have noted, however, several 1789 portfolio companies like SpaceX and Anduril LLC, have sold technology to the government for years. Others, such as Vulcan Elements, received federal funding starting in 2024, before 1789 invested.

== History ==
1789 Capital was founded on October 3, 2022. The founders were members of the Rockbridge Network, including investment banker Omeed Malik, heiress Rebekah Mercer, and entrepreneur Chris Buskirk. They created the firm as a result of the 2022 Rockbridge Summit. Blake Masters was also involved in the initial conversation, according to Bloomberg. The group chose the number 1789 to reflect the year the U.S. Bill of Rights was adopted.

The New York Times reported that Donald Trump Jr. and Malik began planning investments together sometime around 2020, years before Trump Jr. joined the firm.

Alexandra Ulmer and Joseph Tanfani from Reuters remark that Peter Thiel was an instrumental force behind the creation of 1789 Capital. Buskirk was a confidant of Thiel's, while Blake Masters, who formerly worked for Thiel Capital, was also a board member. The fund is intended to create a "parallel economy", a network that combines "businesses, media outlets and political organizations" associated with the America First movement. The firm has invested in Anduril Industries, the defense manufacturing company Hadrian, and other Thiel-backed companies.

The firm was originally registered in Delaware. As of September 2025, it is still registered there, but has its main office in Palm Beach, Florida, and conducts business in the state, with the Tallahassee branch of the Corporation Service Company as their registered agent. They also have an office in Scottsdale, Arizona.

The firm made its first investment into Tucker Carlson and Neil Patel's new media company in 2023. Shortly after Donald Trump won the 2024 United States presidential election, Trump's son Donald Trump Jr. announced that he would be joining as a partner at 1789 Capital instead of joining his father in a government position. As part of the series of transition meetings and industry gatherings routinely held by incoming administrations prior to their inaugurations, 1789 Capital and Type One Ventures co-hosted a luncheon event promoting investment in space and AI companies at Mar-a-Lago, which is owned by Donald Trump, on December 20, 2024.

As of October 2025, the main page for the 1789 Capital website says "Funding the Next Chapter of American Exceptionalism".

According to a May 2026 report by the Financial Times, 1789 Capital's assets under management grew from 200 million dollars to 3.5 billion dollars over the course of about a year — a 17‑fold increase.

In its most recent filing in August 2026, 1789 Capital reported $2.7 billion in regulatory assets under management. The firm, which operates under an "America First" brand, invests in artificial intelligence, defense technology, and real estate. Since the start of the second Trump administration, companies backed by the firm have received more than 735 million dollars in federal contracts, including a 620 million dollar loan from the Pentagon. As reported by TechCrunch, however, many of 1789’s portfolio companies, including SpaceX and Anduril, have been longtime sellers of technology to the government.

== Mission and investments ==
1789 Capital describes itself as promoting "patriotic capitalism", investing in companies that are "anti-woke" and "America First". Malik has stated that the firm is only interested in companies that represent "entrepreneurship, innovation and growth", or "EIG", which he says means companies that have "no ESG or DEI components in them whatsoever." The company's other focuses include "deglobalization" and the creation of a "parallel economy" of conservative businesses, in what Malik has characterized as an effort to "depoliticize" investment. Malik has also said that the firm "represent[s] the silent majority."

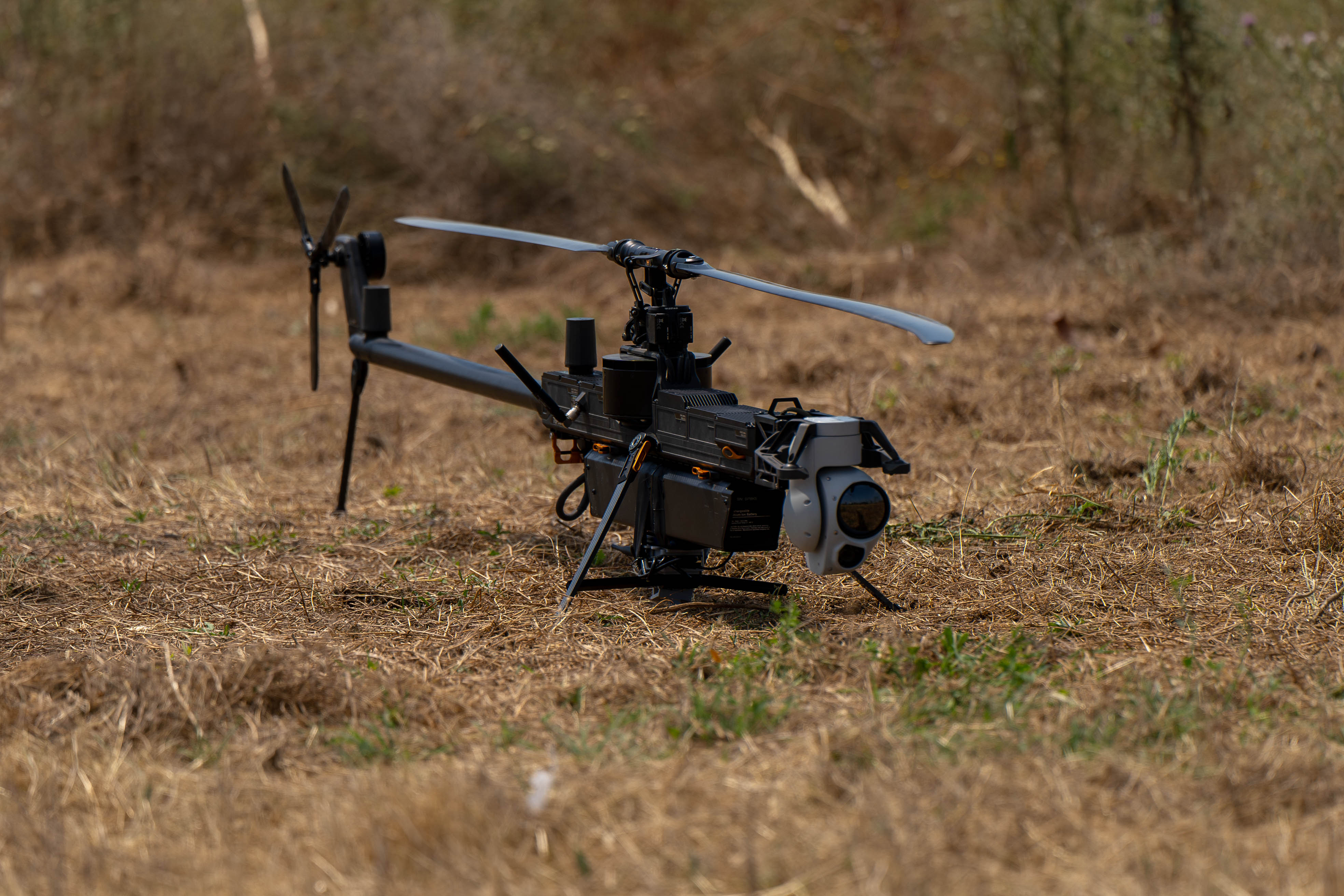
1789 Capital has invested in Anduril Industries, which specializes in unmanned combat machinery, like this Anduril Ghost.

Other notable companies in 1789 Capital’s portfolio include:

- Anduril Industries
- Apex Space
- Ayar Labs
- Base Power Company
- Blink Health
- The Boring Company
- Cerebras Systems
- Chaos Industries
- ClickHouse
- Crusoe
- Databricks
- Deel
- Eliyan Corporation
- Firehawk Aerospace
- Grok
- Hadrian Automation
- K2 Space
- Neuralink
- Nous Research
- Perplexity AI
- Plaid
- Polymarket
- Prometheus
- PsiQuantum
- Ramp
- Reflection AI
- Replit
- Saildrone
- Skild AI
- SpaceX
- Starlab Space
- Vulcan Elements
- VulcanForms
- World Labs

The firm also invests in "almost all of Elon Musk's companies", including Neuralink, X (formerly Twitter), xAI, and SpaceX.

In July 2025, online firearms retailer GrabAGun went public on the New York Stock Exchange through a merger with Colombier Acquisition Corp. II, a SPAC led by Malik. While sometimes conflated with 1789 Capital, the SPAC is an entirely separate investment vehicle. In an interview with IPO Edge, Malik said,

... we select companies that really are cornerstones of that vision of the economy that we want to take public. The Second Amendment is why we were so interested in the GrabAGun transaction as it overtly tries to enhance and insulate the Second Amendment from what we viewed to be a tax on it. Whether as a result of certain elements of the federal government, regulations and general reluctancy to invest in the space, capital markets have largely shut out companies like GrabAGun.

ION Analytics reported that according to partner Paul Abrahimzadeh, 1789 Capital is investing in "late-stage technology companies", including energy companies.

1789 Capital positions itself around entrepreneurship, innovation, and growth (EIG), seeking companies that strengthen the American economy and reduce reliance on foreign supply chains. The firm describes its investment approach as “patriotic capitalism,” evaluating investments by how each one increases America’s security and prosperity, with a focus on domestic companies in defense technology, re-industrialization, artificial intelligence, and related sectors. On the topic, Donald Trump Jr. said, “I’ve turned down major deals where the ethoses don’t align [...] There are people who have become MAGA more recently — and I don’t know they actually believe.”

In August 2025, 1789 Capital invested in Vulcan Elements, a rare earth magnet company with 30 employees. Three months later, Vulcan Elements received a $620 million loan from the U.S. Department of Defense to increase the supply of magnets for industries. This was the largest loan given by the Pentagon’s Office of Strategic Capital.

On September 3, 2025, Bloomberg reported that 1789 Capital had "lined up about $1 billion in initial investor interest" for a new fund that would be used to purchase properties in South Florida, and especially in Palm Beach and Boca Raton, in partnership with a real estate company called the Frisbie Group.

In October 2025, Colombier Acquisition Corp. III, Malik's special purpose acquisition company (SPAC), filed for an initial public offering (IPO) for the New York Stock Exchange, with an initial share price of $10 and 26,000,000 units intended to raise US$260 million. Roth Capital Partners was the underwriter for the move, and Chamath Palihapitiya was reportedly planned to be a director for the company.

== Members and backers ==
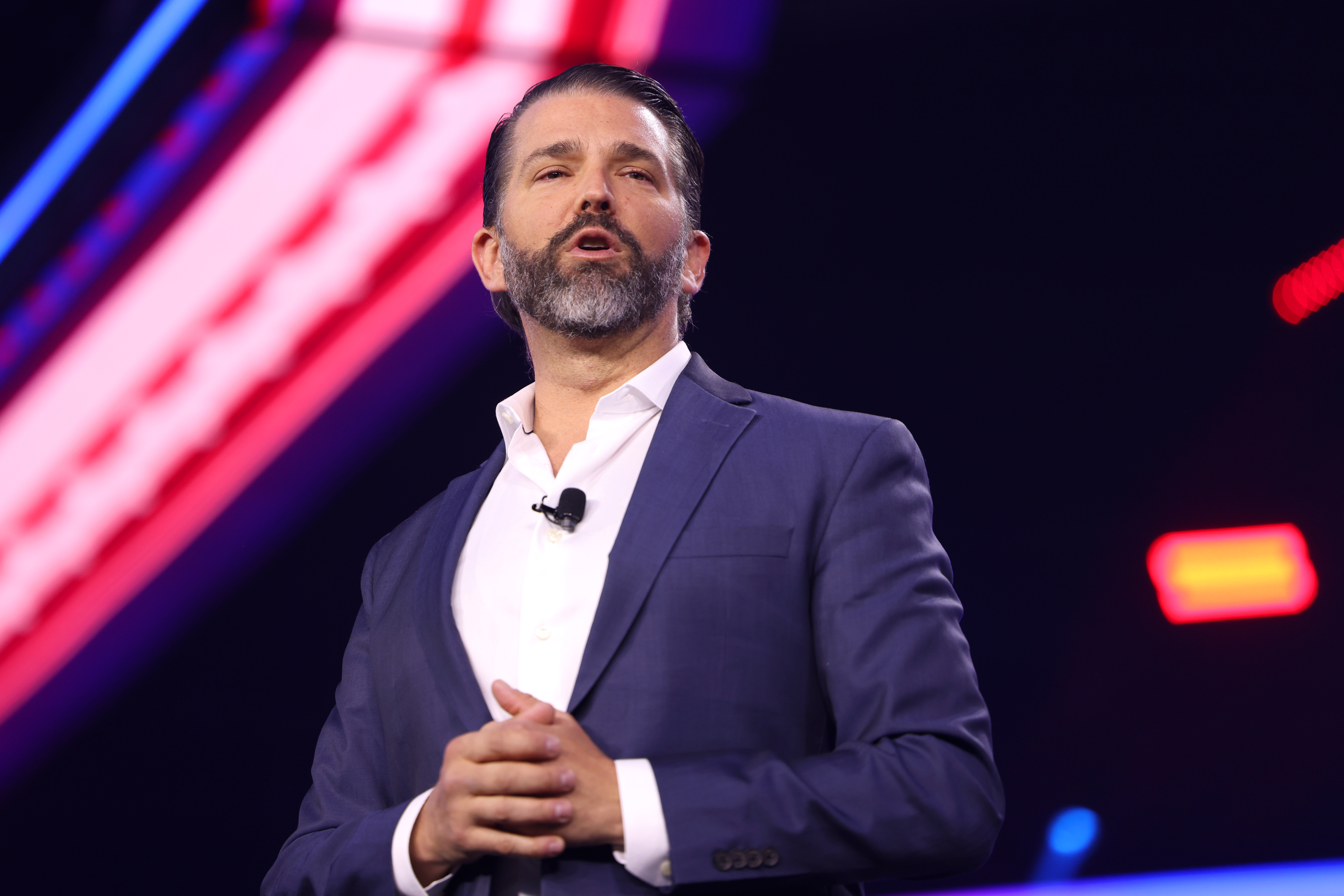
Donald Trump Jr. in December 2024, a few weeks after joining 1789 Capital

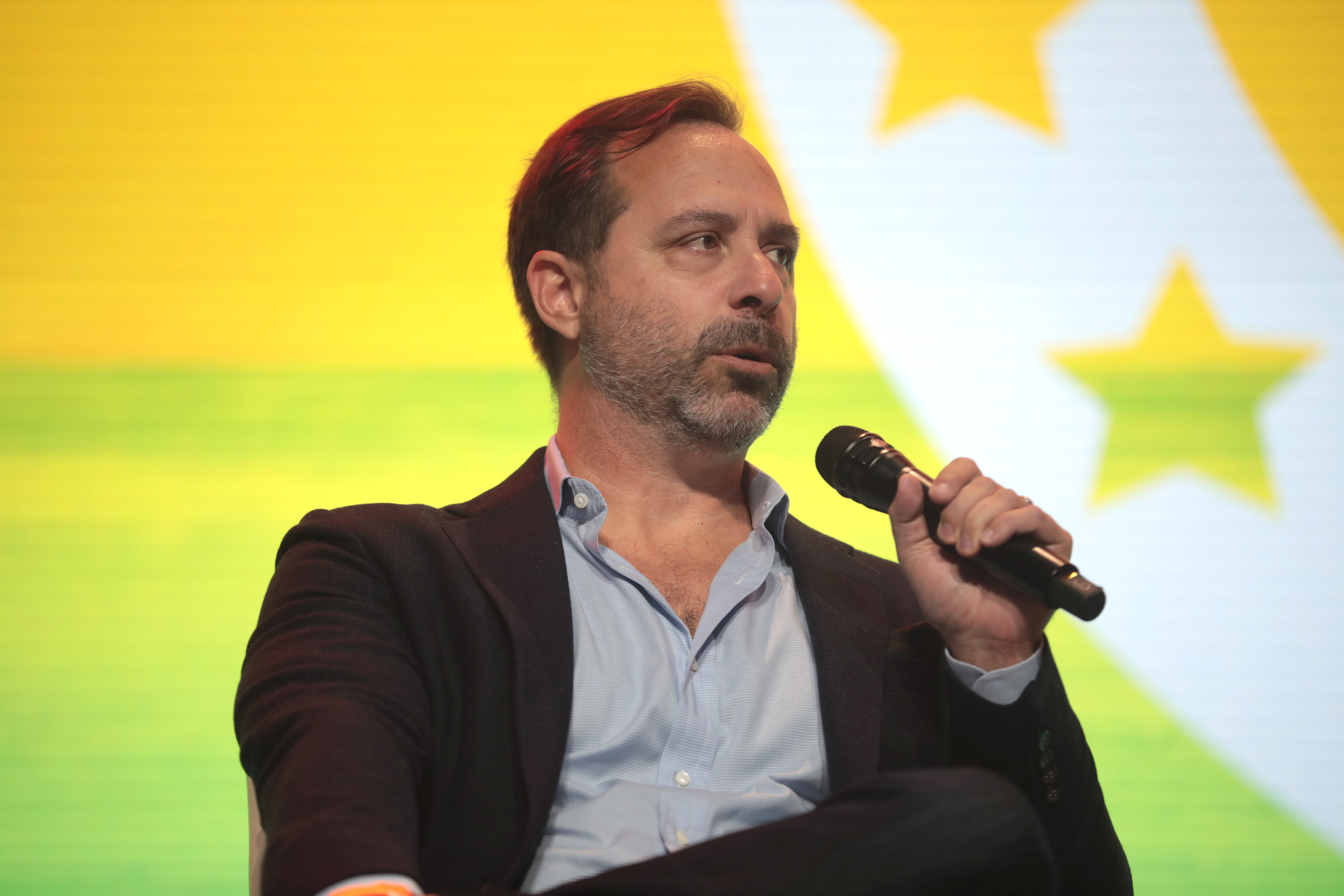
Chris Buskirk in 2020

The firm was founded by Chris Buskirk, Omeed Malik, and Rebekah Mercer. Malik serves as president. Buskirk is CIO. Jordan Cohen is listed as partner and COO. Other partners include Paul Abrahimzadeh, Andy Nasser, Donald Trump Jr., Joe Voboril, and Emanuel Zareh.

Venture capitalist Blake Masters was previously listed as a member of the Board of Advisors, but has since been removed from the website.

Early backers included Marc Andreessen, Charlie Kirk, and Clay Travis.

== 1789 Partners ==
1789 Capital has a South Korea-based think tank called 1789 Partners. CEO of the group is Park Byung-eun, who is also involved with Rockbridge Korea, the Seoul-based branch of the Rockbridge Network. Chung Yong-jin of Shinsegae and Rockbridge Korea is also leading the project.

== Reception ==
Multiple media outlets, financial figures, government watchdogs, ethics experts, and various Democrats have criticized 1789 Capital for its ties to the Trump administration.

Business Insider compared Donald Trump Jr. to Hunter Biden, saying that Trump Jr.'s business dealings–including his involvement in 1789 Capital–resembles the unethical financial schemes that Hunter Biden was accused of pursuing during his father's presidency. Trump Jr. rebuked the comparison in a post on X, calling Hunter Biden a "felon crackhead" and saying that unlike Hunter Biden, he was a businessman before his father's presidency, and his investments had "nothing to do with government". Trump Jr. has repeated this claim when questioned about conflicts of interest, and a spokesman for 1789 Capital told The New York Times that the firm "maximizes transparency and compliance, even though no one at the fund has ever worked in government." Journalists with Reuters and The Daily Beast have disputed Trump Jr.'s claim that he is not profiting off of his father's presidency; one reporter argued that under Trump Jr. the firm has expanded significantly, and has diverted from its goal of "anti-wokeness" to invest in defense companies which have then received government contracts under the Trump administration. Bloomberg, Reuters, and The New York Times have reported that 1789 Capital has invested in multiple companies which received government contracts around the time that the firm invested in them.

Business Insider also reported,

One veteran Wall Street investor, who has personally reviewed 1789's deals, says they enable the president's son to profit from the administration's actions, even if no contractors are given preferential treatment. "It's a way for Mar-A-Lago to get paid," says the investor, who spoke on the condition of anonymity for fear of retribution from the Trump administration.

The Revolving Door Project (Note: The Revolving Door Project's name refers to the concept of the revolving door in politics.) (RDP) has also raised concerns about 1789 Capital. They have highlighted some of the company's operations in their weekly "Corruption Calendar" newsletter alongside other controversies related to the Trump Administration, such as Donald Trump's cryptocurrency, Trump's acceptance of a jet gifted to him by the Qatari Royal Family during his May 2025 visit to the Middle East, Omeed Malik's appointment to the board of Fannie Mae, the Trump administration's choices of which federal employees to hire or terminate, and what the RDP calls "conflicts of interest" around DOGE and Elon Musk's involvement with the government. (Note: See also: Response to the Department of Government Efficiency and Political activities of Elon Musk)

On the subject of Trump Jr.'s investments, Donald Sherman, executive vice president and chief counsel at Citizens for Responsibility and Ethics in Washington (CREW), has said,

I want to make clear that this is a problem, and it’s a problem that impacts the whole of government, but there is no modern or historical comparison for what Don Jr. and the President are doing. [...] The rules themselves aren’t designed, unfortunately, to force the adult children of government officials to report their financial entanglements. But Don Jr. and President Trump continue to make the case for why maybe they should.

1789’s investment in Polymarket drew some controversy given Trump Jr’s role on the company’s advisory board and the timing of the Commodity Futures Trading Commission (CFTC) decision to close its investigation, although corresponding media coverage reported no evidence of wrongdoing or misconduct. Better Markets president Dennis Kelleher said that Polymarket seemed to be using "a backdoor approach to become a regulated exchange." Kelleher also wrote a letter to the CFTC questioning the circumstances of Polymarket's authorization:

"The timeline here tells an interesting story. Polymarket had been under investigation by both the CFTC and the Department of Justice for potentially violating its 2022 settlement with the CFTC, which prohibited it from offering binary options to U.S. users. That investigation was reportedly serious enough for the FBI to raid the home of Polymarket's CEO and seize his phone and electronics. Yet in mid-July, after a change in administration, both agencies closed their investigations."

According to the drone and technology news site DroneXL, Colby Goodman of Transparency International has said the following about 1789 Capital:

There’s always these risks that [Trump Jr.] is going to have inside information or be able to access inside information from the U.S. government for a whole range of things. Just from the procurement side, he could know about upcoming bids, and the content of what that is, and help them win contracts with the U.S. government.

Trump Jr. and 1789 have both vehemently disputed these concerns, and a spokesperson for Trump Jr. said he “had no involvement in negotiations with the government on behalf of 1789’s portfolio companies.”

Around August or September 2025, Rebecca Ballhaus of The Wall Street Journal (WSJ) filed a broad FOIA request to the SEC, asking for "any records involving 1789 Capital, including any emails and text messages to or from 1789 Capital domains and any records that mention 1789 Capital." John A. Jenkins of Law Street reported that this was remarkable because Ballhaus' work "focuses on politics and government and includes investigations into conflicts of interest across the federal government; harassment and abuse at federal agencies; and the role of high-dollar donors in politics." Jenkins also said that "FOIA requests to the federal government can be an important early warning of bad publicity, litigation to come, or uncertainties to be hedged and gamed out", and that the request represents "a possible escalation of the tension between" Donald Trump and Rupert Murdoch, who owns the WSJ and was sued by Trump earlier in the year for an article about the nature of the relationship between Donald Trump and Jeffrey Epstein.

In October 2025, The Wall Street Journal reported that 1789 Capital had "tried to sell sponsorships for a conference pitched to companies as the 'Inaugural U.S. Treasury A.I. Summit,' during which it said Treasury Secretary Scott Bessent would unveil the Treasury Department’s artificial-intelligence strategy." The U.S. Department of the Treasury said that they had not approved these promotional materials, and WSJ said that after their reporters inquired about the event, "the conference organizers released some details about it—including a different name for it, 'AI Summit on American Prosperity,' that no longer included the word 'Treasury.'" Ethics expert Norm Eisen voiced concern that “the official imprimatur of the U.S. Treasury [was] being used for an event that appear[ed] to result in the personal gain of outside actors”. Ja'han Jones of MSNBC said that "the Trump administration" appeared to be "trying to downplay any appearance of impropriety", and that this incident "continue[d] the string of conflict of interest concerns emerging from 1789 Capital and its ties to the Trump family." The Wall Street Journal also reported that the organizer for the event, a company called the Prometheus Initiative, was co-founded by Christopher Buskirk, who also co-founded 1789 Capital.

Drug-company representatives have criticized 1789 Capital's investment into BlinkRX, which helps drugmakers sell directly to patients, since the firm and Trump Jr. are likely to benefit from Donald Trump's May 2025 executive order directing pharmaceutical manufacturers to offer an online option for people to purchase prescription drugs without using insurance. BlinkRx, however, was not named in the announcement unveiling TrumpRx, and the company said it had “no role in the development” of it. The criticism increased when 1789 Capital and BlinkRX hosted a "Future of Pharmaceuticals" conference featuring members of the Trump administration with a dinner at the Executive Branch club, which is also owned by some of the members of 1789 Capital, though BlinkRx stated “no company will be pitching any services” at the conference.

Research from Progress watchdog Citizens for Responsibility and Ethics found no wrongdoing when examining the relationship between 1789 Capital, BlinkRX and the Trump Administration.”

Other critics include Richard Painter and Ann Skeet.

== See also ==
- Altimeter Capital
- Big Tech
- BlackRock
- Cambridge Analytica
- Counter-economics
- Diversity, equity, and inclusion policies of the second Trump administration
- Dollar voting
- Donald Trump 2024 presidential campaign
- Heritage Foundation
- JD Vance
- List of Florida companies
- List of venture capital firms
- Parallel economy
- PublicSquare
- Rumble (company)
- Ryan Kavanaugh
- Socially responsible investing
- Trae Stephens
- Vivek Ramaswamy
