= Ryun =

Ryun may refer to the following people:

Given name

- Ryun Williams (born 1969), American basketball coach

Surname

- Jim Ryun (born 1947), American politician and track and field athlete
- Ned Ryun (born 1973), American political activist

== See also ==
- Cha Ye-ryun (born 1985), South Korean actress
- Jo Hye-ryun (born 1970), South Korean comedian
- Park Hye-ryun, South Korean screenwriter
