= Rose Institute of State and Local Government =

Public policy research institute

- Established: 1973
- Faculty: 6 (Senior Staff and Faculty Advisors)
- Staff: 35
- Address: 888 Columbia Avenue, Claremont, CA 91711
- Location: Claremont McKenna College
- Website: RoseInstitute.org

The Rose Institute of State and Local Government is a research institute based out of Claremont McKenna College in Claremont, California. Founded in 1973, the Institute is particularly well known for its expertise in elections, demographics, fiscal policy, and public opinion.

== History ==
The Rose Institute of State and Local Government at Claremont McKenna College was founded in 1973 to study issues facing California’s state and local governments. It is one of eleven research institutes at Claremont McKenna College. The Institute is named after Edessa Rose, a businesswoman, lawyer, feminist, and activist, who was its founding donor. Rose was born in 1903 and was one of the few women lawyers of her generation. In 1972, she became the first female trustee of Claremont McKenna College, three years before the college began admitting women. Rose was deeply interested in politics and enthusiastically supported CMC’s effort to establish an institute focused on state and local government.

In its early period (1973–1990), the Rose Institute established expertise in demographics, voting behavior, public opinion, and redistricting. It developed the nation's first comprehensive statewide demographic and political database. Faculty, staff, and students worked together to match California's 50,000 precincts to its 5,000-plus census tracts, following the political and demographic trends in the state. The Institute became a national leader in census tracking and the use of Geographic Information System (GIS) technology. In 1979, the California Business Roundtable gave a million dollar grant to fund a significant redistricting reform and education program at the institute, and the Institute played a significant part in the California redistrictings of 1970-73, 1980-83, and 1991.

Since then, the Rose Institute has diversified into areas such as fiscal policy, direct democracy, voter education, criminal justice policy, federalism, and California’s competitiveness. Most recently, the Institute launched a polling program, sponsoring a significant national pre-election poll in 2022. The 2022 CMC-Rose Institute Poll published two reports, Battleground Pennsylvania: The 2022 Election and Red vs. Blue States: Competing Visions for 2022 and 2024. Professor Andrew Sinclair heads the Rose Institute’s polling program.

The Rose Institute has also supported various political reform efforts, including the establishment in 2008 of California’s Independent Redistricting Commission. It has convened many policy conferences and sponsored talks by leaders in public affairs from across the ideological spectrum to promote good government, civic education, and democratic engagement. In 2023, the Institute hosted a housing symposium, featuring ten public officials for a discussion moderated by former Governor Gray Davis.

Since its founding, the institute has been committed to using student-faculty teams to conduct research. The Institute typically employs 25-30 students each year. In total, more than 450 Claremont Colleges students have worked for the Rose Institute as research assistants. Students have made significant contributions to nearly all Institute projects, from design to execution.

=== Directors ===
David Alan Heslop was the first director of the Rose Institute, serving from 1973 to 2000. Professor Heslop was a member of the CMC Government Department, holding the Don and Edessa Rose Chair of State and Local Government and is the author of books and articles on an array of subjects, primarily in the area of electoral politics. Heslop's publications include Political Corruption in America (1978), Reapportionment Politics: The History of Redistricting in the 50 States (1981), and Redistricting in the 1980's (1993).

Ralph Rossum was the second director of the Institute, from 2000 to 2010. He was the Salvatori Professor of American Constitutionalism until his retirement in 2022. Professor Rossum’s research ranges across the American Founding, American Constitutionalism, crime and criminal justice, Constitutional Law, the Supreme Court, and voting rights. He is the author of numerous books and articles including Understanding Clarence Thomas: The Jurisprudence of Constitutional Restoration (2014), American Constitutional Law Volume I: The Structure of Government, Volume II: The Bill of Rights and Subsequent Amendments Eleventh Edition (2020), Antonin Scalia’s Jurisprudence: Text and Tradition, paperback edition with a new afterword, 2016, and The Supreme Court and Tribal Gaming: California v. Cabazon Band of Mission Indians (2011).

Andrew Busch, the Crown Professor of Government and George P. Roberts Fellow, was the third director of the Institute, from 2011 to 2021. He has authored or co-authored fifteen books on American politics, including The Rules and Politics of American Primaries (2020), A Brief History of Public Policy Since the New Deal (2019), Epic Journey: The 2008 Elections and American Politics, Revised post-midterm election version (2011) and The Constitution on the Campaign Trail: The Surprising Political Career of America’s Founding Document (2007), along with more than thirty articles and chapters. In 2007, he received a Fulbright fellowship to lecture on American politics at the Diplomatic Academy of Ukraine and served as the Ann and Herbert Vaughan Fellow in the James Madison Program in American Ideals and Institutions at Princeton University in the 2009-2010 academic year.

Kenneth P. Miller, the Rose Professor of State and Local Government, has been the director since 2021. Dr. Miller’s research focuses on state government institutions, with an emphasis on direct democracy and the interaction between law and politics. His publications include Texas vs. California: A History of Their Struggle for the Future of America (Oxford University Press, 2020), Direct Democracy and the Courts (Cambridge University Press, 2009), and co-edited volumes Parchment Barriers: Political Polarization and the Limits of Constitutional Order (University Press of Kansas, 2018) and The New Political Geography of California (Berkeley Public Policy Press, 2008). Dr. Miller was the Ann and Herbert W. Vaughan Visiting Fellow in the James Madison Program in American Ideals and Institutions at Princeton University (2011-2012) and a visiting scholar at the John Goodwin Tower Center for Political Studies at Southern Methodist University (2017-2018). At the Rose Institute, he has worked with students on numerous research projects, including the Rose Institute Poll, the biennial Video Voter Guide project, and the 24-state Miller-Rose Institute Initiative Database.

== Mission ==
The mission of the Rose Institute of State and Local Government is to enhance the education of students at CMC, to produce high quality research, and to promote public understanding on issues of state and local government, politics, and policy, with an emphasis on California.

Students accepted into the Rose Institute program work as research assistants under the direction of the Institute academic staff and in collaboration with other faculty members who serve as Faculty Advisors. Student research assistants learn the skills of identifying sources of information, assembling and analyzing data, preparing the results of their research in a report for clients or for publication, and presenting their research orally in front of an audience and with supporting media. Research and analytical training includes sessions on understanding local government finance, the use of computer-assisted analysis for demographic and other data, interviewing public officials and others for information, and exercising judgment in the selection and presentation of the results of research. Rose students are expected to develop management skills in designing and executing their research projects, and in organizing and supervising members of a research team. The Rose Institute provides a stipend to its research assistants as a means of helping them with the cost of their education. The Rose Institute Board of Governors meets periodically with students to discuss their projects, and individual members are willing mentors to students in their professional fields.

The Institute’s research interests include fiscal and economic analysis, demographic and political analysis related to redistricting and representation, and assembling data for policy decision-making and to examine the results of particular programs in a variety of policy areas. The research is disseminated in a variety of ways, including in published reports, newsletters, on the internet, and in public forums. In all of its programs and publications, the Rose Institute strives for objectivity and professionalism. The Institute’s research is supported by faculty of the Claremont Colleges. At present, the Institute has a Board of Faculty Advisors composed of Professors Andrew Busch, Michael Fortner, Emily Pears, Shanna Rose, and Andrew Sinclair, as well as additional faculty affiliates.

== Projects ==
The Institute conducts a broad range of research that supports faculty academic research, public education, and applied studies for both public and private entities. Topics have ranged from local governance, public services, elections, ballot measures, crime and criminal justice, housing, transportation, and water quality and availability. Consistent with the Rose Institute’s mission, most of its projects have focused on state and local governance in California. The Rose Institute has conducted fiscal, regulatory, and survey analysis for counties, municipal governments, Native American tribal governments, news organizations, and other businesses in Los Angeles County, Orange County, the Inland Empire, and San Diego County. Some projects include comparative analysis with jurisdictions in other parts of the United States, including its 50-state comprehensive study of Redistricting in America (2011) and its 24-state Initiative Database. Recent projects include the Institute’s long-standing survey of the cost of doing business in local jurisdictions, a survey of California’s city managers for the California City Management Foundation, a resident survey for the City of Ontario, and a fee study for the City of Covina.

=== CMC-Rose Institute Poll ===
The Rose Institute has expanded its research to include polling projects. In 2021, the Institute polled voters in California and New York to determine their perceptions of their states' respective political institutions. In 2022, the Institute released two polling reports: Battleground Pennsylvania: The 2022 Election and Red vs. Blue States: Competing Visions for 2022 and 2024. These reports were referenced by major publications such as FiveThirtyEight and the Los Angeles Times.

=== Miller-Rose Initiative Database ===
The Rose Institute maintains the Miller-Rose Institute Initiative Database, created by current Director Ken Miller and Rose Institute students in 2008. The database provides a summary of all voter-approved ballot initiatives throughout the United States from 1904 to 2023. It also presents information on post-election judicial challenges to these measures. This resource contains more than 1,000 voter-approved initiatives from the 24 states that use the initiative process.

=== Inland Empire Outlook ===
The Inland Empire Outlook is a biannual publication of the Rose Institute that focuses on the economic and political analysis of the Inland Empire region. The articles are researched and written by undergraduate research assistants under the supervision of Institute senior staff or affiliated faculty.

=== Kosmont-Rose Institute Cost of Doing Business Survey ===
For more than two decades, the Rose Institute has regularly published the Kosmont-Rose Institute Cost of Doing Business Survey. This Survey presents data on various cost factors, including sales taxes, business license fees, and utility taxes, and minimum wage, in numerous cities in California and other states. The 2022 Survey introduced a direct comparative analysis of the cost of doing business in jurisdictions in Southern California and in cities outside of the state where California businesses most frequently migrate, as part of the Institute’s focus on California’s competitiveness. This edition of the survey also introduced interactive maps and other forms of data visualization to enhance understanding of the cost of doing business. Local news sources cited the study as evidence of a broader trend in business emigration from California.

=== Video Voter Series ===
In each election cycle since 2012, the Rose Institute has produced a Video Voter Guide, a resource for voters to find objective, non-partisan information about California’s statewide ballot measures. Under the supervision of Rose Institute faculty and staff, student research assistants research state propositions, produce written “Backgrounders” on each measure, and then create a concise two-to-three minute video that explains the measure, summarizes the strongest arguments for and against the measure, and notes the measure’s leading supporters and opponents. The Institute posts the Backgrounders and videos on its website and also disseminates the videos through social media platforms.

== Rose Board of Governors ==
The Rose Institute has a voluntary Board of Governors (BoG) who provide advice, insights and resources to the Institute faculty and students. The BoG meets twice a year on campus to discuss Institute business, review projects, review student researched work and to reconnect with the Institute.

=== Board of Governors Officers ===
Chair - Ryder Todd Smith, CMC 1996

Vice-Chair - Jessica Witt, CMC 2000

Vice-Chair - Deborah Gonzalez, CMC 1985

== Notable alumni ==
- Sean Elsbernd, Chief of Staff for San Francisco Mayor London Breed and former member of the San Francisco Board of Supervisors
- Larry André, Jr., former U.S. ambassador to Somalia, Djibouti, and Mauritiana
- Elizabeth Wydra, president, Constitutional Accountability Center
- Henry Olsen, III, senior fellow, Ethics and Public Policy Center and Washington Post columnist
- Ilan Wurman, Professor of Law, Sandra Day O’Connor College of Law, Arizona State University
- Ashwin Navin, founder, SambaTV
- Matt Grossman, Professor of Political Science, Michigan State University
- Douglas Johnson, President, National Demographics Corporation
- Abhi Nemani, Co-founder, Code for America
- Ryder Todd Smith, President and Co-founder, Tripepi Smith
