= Philip Merrill College of Journalism =

Journalism school of the University of Maryland

Coordinates: 38°59′12.8″N 76°56′53.5″W

- Type: Public
- Established: 1947
- Parent institution: University of Maryland, College Park
- Location: College Park, Maryland, United States
- Campus: Suburban
- Website: merrill.umd.edu

The Philip Merrill College of Journalism is the journalism school of the University of Maryland, College Park.

== History ==
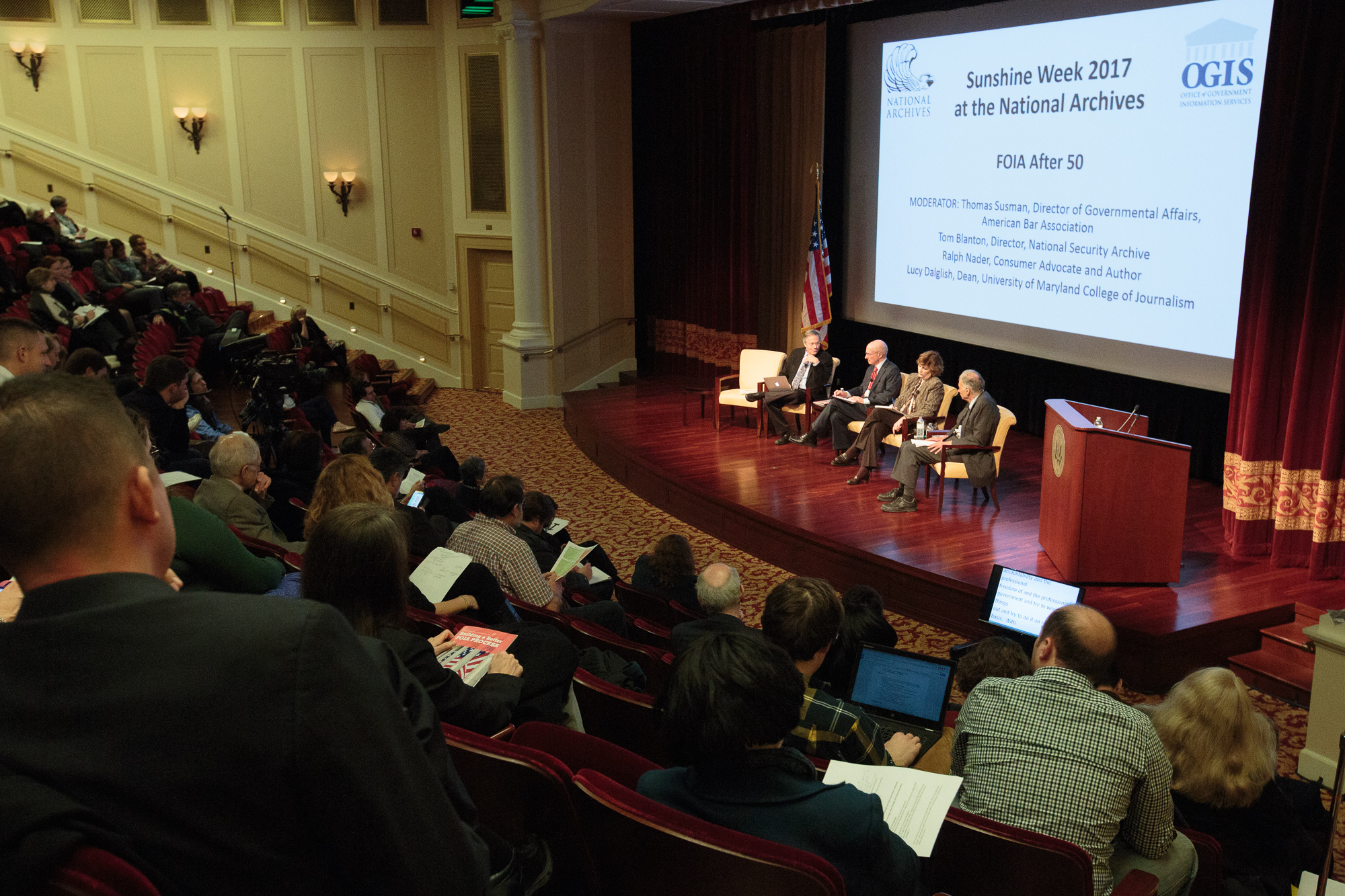
Lucy Dalglish, then-dean of the Philip Merrill College of Journalism (second from right) joins (from left) Tom Blanton of the National Security Archive, Thomas M. Susman of the American Bar Association and consumer advocate Ralph Nader, for a 2017 panel discussion on the Freedom of Information Act.

The college was originally founded in 1947 and was renamed after newspaper editor Philip Merrill in 2001.

The university's student newspaper, The Diamondback, is not affiliated with the school. However, the school provides opportunities for students to publish work with the Capital News Service (Maryland), a wire service serving print, broadcast and online media in the Washington, D.C. region and Maryland Newsline, a live half-hour three-day-per-week news broadcast (during the fall and spring semesters) that reaches more than 500,000 households in the greater Washington metropolitan area. The newscast is now streamed via YouTube in HD.

The school is home to the National Association of Black Journalists, the largest organization of journalists of color in the U.S. From 1987 to 2015, the university published American Journalism Review, a magazine covering print, television, radio and online media; in 2013 AJR became an online-only publication, and in 2015, the college announced that it was terminating the journal.

In 2018, the Scripps Howard Foundation established the Howard Center for Investigative Journalism at the Philip Merrill College of Journalism.

Emmy Award-winners include Eaton Broadcast Chair Mark Feldstein.

== Notable alumni ==
- Bonnie Bernstein, ESPN and CBS sportscaster
- Carl Bernstein, who worked with Bob Woodward to uncover the Watergate Scandal, attended the school but did not graduate
- Connie Chung, former anchor and reporter for NBC, CBS, ABC, CNN, and MSNBC.
- Sarah Cohen, Pulitzer winner with The Washington Post
- Mark Davis, talk show host and writer, KSKY Dallas-Ft Worth, Salem Media Group, Dallas Morning News, townhall.com
- Christine Delargy, 2012 Walter Cronkite Award for Excellence in Television Political Journalism, former senior producer and video content manager for POLITICO
- Jon Franklin, two-time Pulitzer Prize winner
- Emilio Garcia-Ruiz, editor-in-chief of the San Francisco Chronicle.
- Jane Healey, Pulitzer winner with the Orlando Sentinel
- John A. Jenkins, publisher of Congressional Quarterly
- Dick Jerardi, Philadelphia Daily News sportswriter, 2014 elected to the United States Basketball Sportswriters Association Hall of Fame
- Samantha Waldenberg, CNN White House producer
- Tim Kurkjian, ESPN Baseball writer and reporter
- David Mills, Emmy-winning TV writer and producer
- Mi-Ai Parrish, president and publisher Arizona Republic, azcentral.com, kansascity.com, Kansas City Star and Idaho Statesman; first minority in all; first female publisher of the Kansas City Star.
- Megha Rajagopalan, Pulitzer winner with BuzzFeed news.
- Giuliana Rancic, E! News presenter and TV personality.
- Jimmy Roberts, NBC Sports Host
- Patrick J. Sloyan, Pulitzer winner with Newsday
- Scott Van Pelt, ESPN Sportscenter anchor (left the university one course short of completing his degree requirements)
- Pam Ward, ESPN play-by-play commentator; first female play-by-play announcer for college football in television history
