= American Majority Action =

Voter education organization

- Founded: 2010
- Founder: Ned Ryun
- Type: 501(c)(4) non-profit political action organization
- Purpose: Conservative principles, small government, and grassroots activism
- Location: Purcellville, Virginia
- Region served: United States
- Method: Political campaign strategy, grassroots organizing
- Key people: Ned Ryun, CEO
- Affiliations: American Majority
- Website: americanmajorityaction.org

American Majority Action is a conservative 501(c)(4) non-profit political action organization which focuses on voter education and mobilization efforts.

Founded in August 2010, American Majority Action is affiliated with American Majority, a 501(c)(3) non-profit organization that identifies and trains grassroots candidates and activists for local and state campaigns. The founder and president of American Majority Action is Ned Ryun.

== Activities ==
In October 2010, American Majority Action released the Voter Fraud App, a smartphone app developed to report and track illegal voting activity at polling places. Using photographs and text, the Voter Fraud App compiled a list of alleged vote fraud incidents and was updated in real-time throughout election day.

In 2012, American Majority Action launched a #FireBoehner campaign aimed at removing John Boehner from his position as Speaker of the United States House of Representatives.
