= Seth Leibsohn =

American talk show host

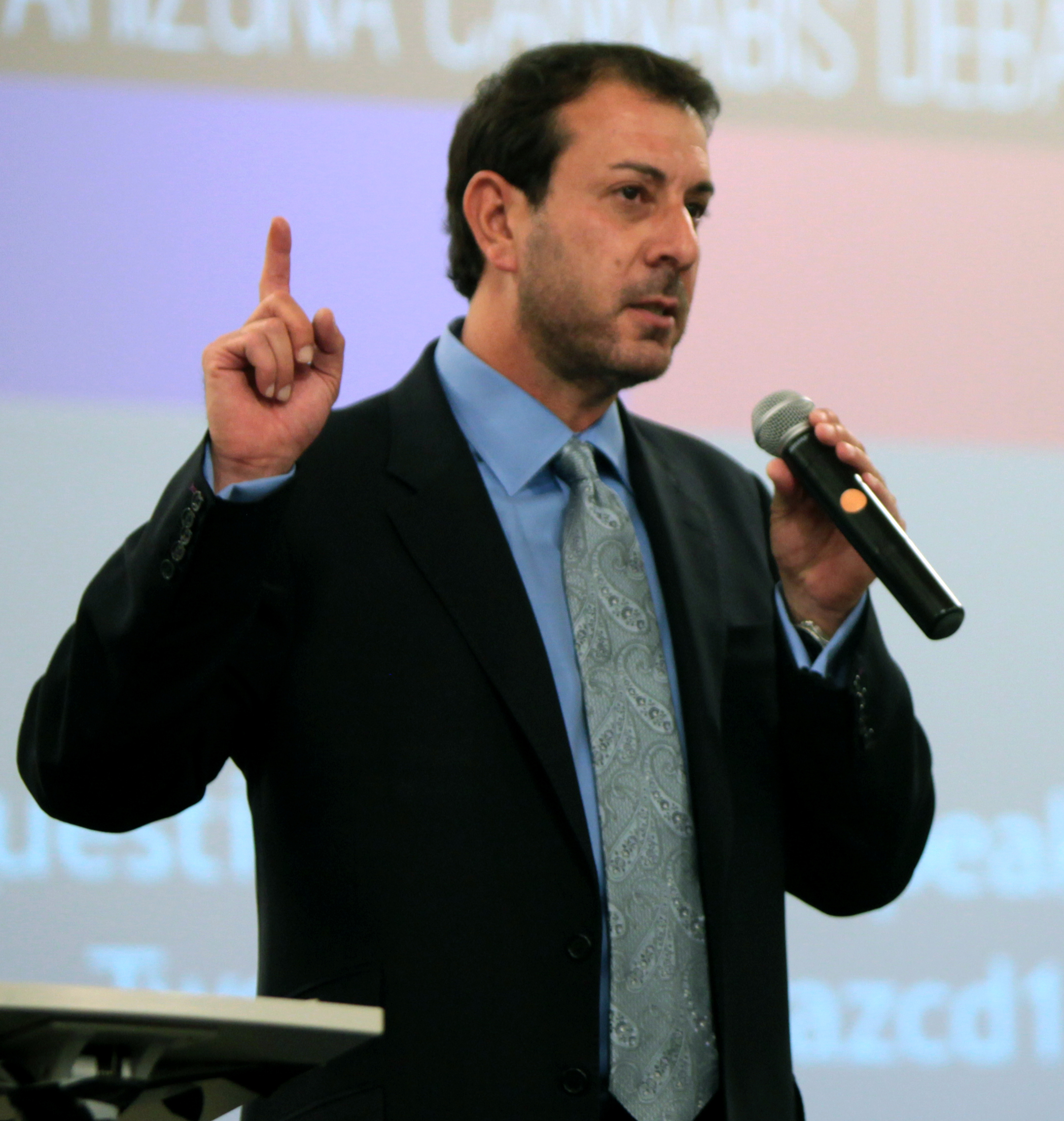
- Leibsohn at a debate regarding legalizing marijuana in Arizona on April 29, 2015 at Arizona State University in Phoenix, Arizona.
- Born: November 17, 1968 (age 57); Phoenix, Arizona, United States
- Education: Pitzer College; Claremont Graduate University; Northeastern University
- Occupations: Conservative talk show host, political consultant, author, radio producer
- Known for: Bill Bennett's Morning in America, Empower America, Senior Fellow - Claremont Institute, Arizonans for Responsible Drug Policy

Seth Leibsohn is a conservative talk show host and author. He is also a senior fellow at the Claremont Institute, and was the producer for Bill Bennett's Morning in America, a syndicated talk show in the 2000s. Most recently he was the co-host, along with Chris Buskirk, of the Phoenix-based talk show, The Seth and Chris Show. He resigned from the show in order to run for the House Seat vacated by Kyrsten Sinema. However, when the consulting group his campaign hired to spearhead the campaign failed to collect the required number of signatures to appear on the ballot, he was forced to withdraw from the race. Currently, he hosts The Seth Leibsohn Show..

== Biography ==
Leibsohn was born on November 17, 1968, in Phoenix, Arizona, the son of Marian and Eugene Leibsohn. He did his undergraduate work at Pitzer College, his post-graduate work at Claremont Graduate University, and obtained his law degree from Northeastern University School of Law. During his college days Leibsohn was a liberal, and credited Harry V. Jaffa with having led him into conservative thought. While a student, Leibsohn had written an article which had strongly criticized Jaffa. Instead of confronting Leibsohn, Jaffa set out to introduce him to a "line of thought and reason I never even knew existed, walked me through everything he could teach me, and never let go ... He changed my whole life.".

== Career ==
For many years, Leibsohn served as the Chief of Staff to former Cabinet secretaries William J. Bennett, Jeane Kirkpatrick, and Jack Kemp. In 2011, he was selected by Rick Santorum as his senior advisor for policy, and served in Santorum's PAC. He was a vice-president of two of the nation's premier think tanks, Empower America and the Claremont Institute. His is also a senior editor at American Greatness, a conservative online journal. He was also the former director of policy for the Jewish Policy Center. In 2015, Leibsohn became the chairman of the anti-legalizing marijuana advocacy group, "Arizonans for Responsible Drug Policy", which opposed the attempt to get a legalizing marijuana referendum on the 2016 ballot. The group was credited as being a primary force in defeating an attempt to make marijuana in Arizona legal in 2016.

As a radio host, in 2016, Leibsohn interviewed Kelli Ward, then a candidate in the Republican primary for the U.S. Senate going up against John McCain. During the interview Ward made the following comment as part of a longer response to Leibsohn's query about how the U.S. should respond to ISIS: "We can't continue with this strategy of go in and do nation building, try to spread democracy, and unfortunately we had that policy under George W. Bush as well. It isn't what traditional conservative foreign policy has been, which is restraint and realism. Those things need to be brought back into the process in the foreign policy arena. I think that we also, we have to be willing to decimate ISIS - not control them, not to curb their activities." The one comment, "restraint and realism", became the theme of several anti-Ward commercials in both the 2016 and 2018 Republican primaries, in an attempt to show that Ward was weak on terrorism. After the death of Aretha Franklin in 2018, when Bill Clinton, Louis Farrakhan, Al Sharpton, and Jesse Jackson all appeared on stage together, Leibsohn posited the question, "What do you think would be said about Donald Trump, President Trump, if he were on a stage at a big event with someone who said, ‘Satanic Jews have infected the whole world with poison and deceit’?”

In 2023, Leibsohn co-founded and became president of the Coalition for Youth Drug Abuse Prevention.. In 2025, he joined the faculty of the School of Civic and Economic Thought and Leadership at Arizona State University.

== Author ==
He has co-authored several books during the course of his career. In 2011, with Bill Bennett, he co-authored The Fight of Our Lives, a study of America's current battle against radical Islam. In 2017 he and his fellow radio commentator Chris Buskirk wrote American Greatness, an analysis of how many of establishment conservatives, the Washington elite, and the mainstream media were so out of step with the 2016 Presidential election.

== Congressional run ==
In September 2017, Leibsohn announced his intention to run for the congressional seat vacated by Kyrsten Sinema, who was leaving her District 9 House seat to run for the U.S. Senate. Rick Santorum endorsed his run for Congress. However, after the political consulting group Leibsohn had hired to guide his candidacy had failed to collect enough signatures to appear on the ballot, Leibsohn was forced to withdraw from the race.

== Views ==
Leibsohn is a staunch advocate against the legalization of marijuana. He headed the group "Arizonans for Responsible Drug Policy", which was instrumental in preventing the legalization of marijuana in Arizona. He has co-authored several articles with Bill Bennett regarding the dangers of marijuana, which got picked up in numerous newspapers including the Los Angeles Times and The Tampa Tribune.

In January 1987, as a senior in Arcadia High School, Leibsohn was a proponent for Arizona proclaiming a holiday to commemorate Martin Luther King Jr.; in June 1987, Arizona proclaimed a "Martin Luther King Jr./Civil Rights Day", to be held coincident with the national day each January.
