= Chris Buskirk =

American political writer and venture capitalist (born 1968 or 1969)

Christopher Buskirk
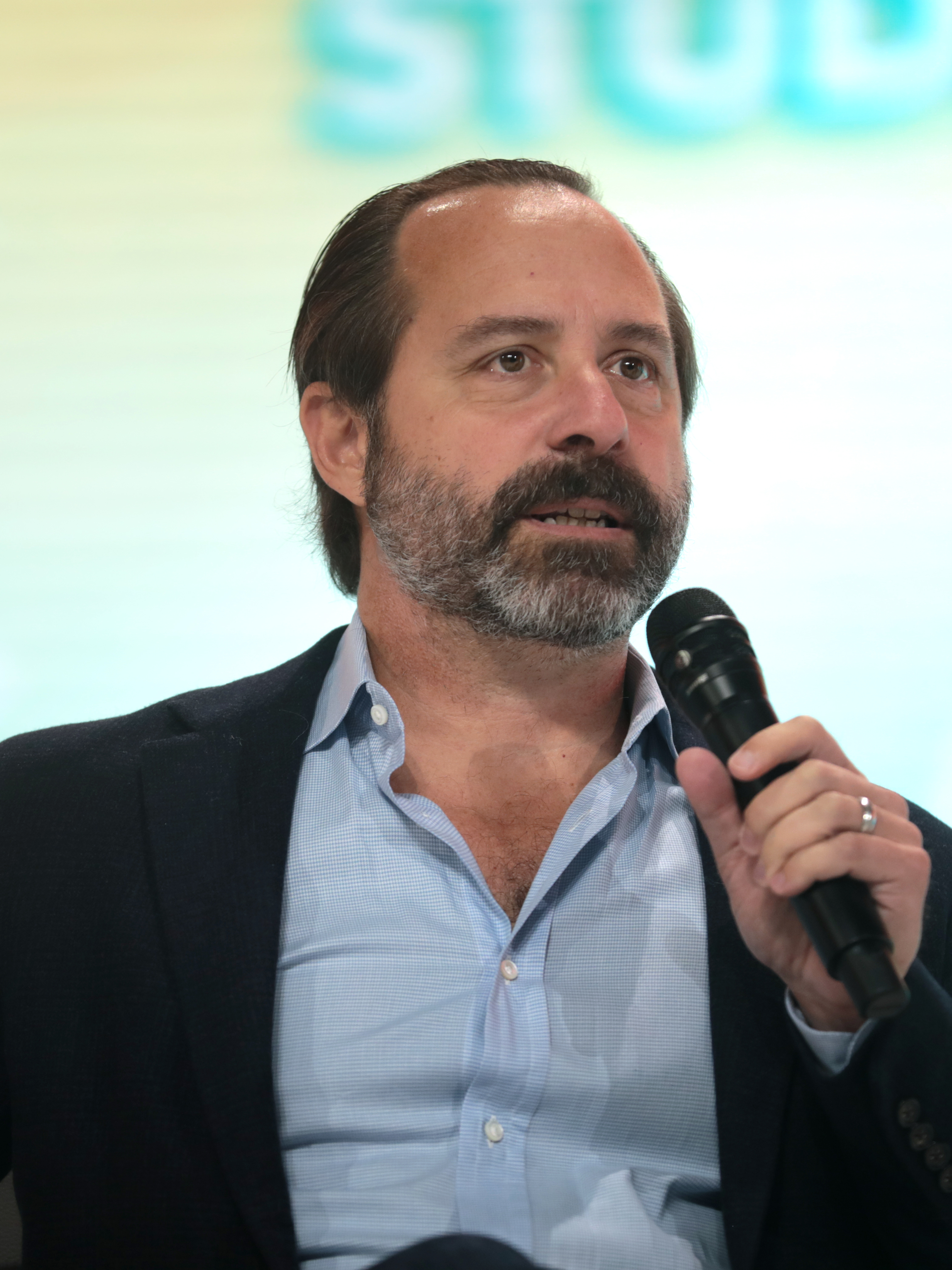
- Buskirk at the 2021 Turning Point Action Student Action Summit
- Born: February 1, 1969 (age 57); Germany
- Citizenship: United States
- Education: Claremont McKenna College
- Occupations: Venture capitalist; writer
- Known for: 1789 Capital, Rockbridge Network
- Children: 4

Christopher Buskirk (born February 1, 1969) is an American conservative media figure, writer, and venture capitalist. He is known for his connections to Donald Trump and the MAGA movement, including through Rockbridge Network and 1789 Capital, both of which he co-founded.

== Early life and education ==
Buskirk was born in 1969 to American parents on a military base in Germany. He grew up in Scottsdale, Arizona, and worked at his father's insurance businesses. He studied political science and government at Claremont McKenna College, earning a bachelor's degree. He was also a Claremont Institute Publius Fellow. He began pursuing a master's degree but did not complete it, instead beginning his career in finance.

In one of his early experiences, he became frustrated watching American factory jobs disappear after China joined the World Trade Organization in 2001. While visiting family in Michigan, he said he watched as entire “factories were literally just packed up, crated into 40-foot containers and sent to China".

He raged to friends that the American Dream, “that you don’t have to do anything extraordinary to live a dignified life,” was becoming harder, but he felt powerless. “I was just, like, some guy in Arizona,” he recalled. “What am I going to do?”

Buskirk also received a fellowship from the Earhart Foundation.

== Career ==
Early in his career, Buskirk founded several businesses, including an investment firm called Buskirk Capital. Around 2015, he sold most of his businesses and began focusing on political writing in the period leading up to the 2016 elections.

=== News and media ===
Since 2015, Buskirk has written for several publications, including American Compass, The American Mind, Compact Magazine, The Critic, The Hill, The New Criterion, The Patriot-News, The Spectator, The Telegraph, USA Today, and The Washington Post. He was a contributing opinion writer for The New York Times from April 2018 to March 2021.

He has also been interviewed on Channel 4 News, The Charlie Kirk Show, Grand Canyon Times, Conservative Conversations (a podcast by the Intercollegiate Studies Institute), Economic War Room, Maganomics (posted by the Donald Trump YouTube channel), NPR, and the Salem News Channel.

He has contributed to PBS News Hour and Fox News, including a Fox News podcast called The Positive Populist. Most of his articles are opinion pieces about American conservative politics, and he has served as an expert on the American political landscape in relation to Donald Trump.

=== American Greatness ===
Buskirk is the founder and president of the Center for American Greatness, a non-profit public policy organization established in 2017. In early 2016, Buskirk created an online journal called American Greatness with the intent to provide an alternative to "legacy conservative media." He has been editor and publisher since its inception. Progressive advocacy group Media Matters has characterized American Greatness as "far-right and nationalist" and criticized Buskirk for platforming white nationalists through his shows and publications.

=== Author ===
Buskirk is the author of multiple books, published through conservative publishing companies like Encounter Books and Regnery Publishing. He wrote Trump vs. The Leviathan (2018) and America and the Art of the Possible (2023), and he co-authored American Greatness: How Conservatism, Inc. Missed the 2016 Election & What the Establishment Needs to Learn (2017) and Blinders: How the Experts Missed the Biggest Election Upset in American History (2017).

=== Podcasts and speaking engagements ===
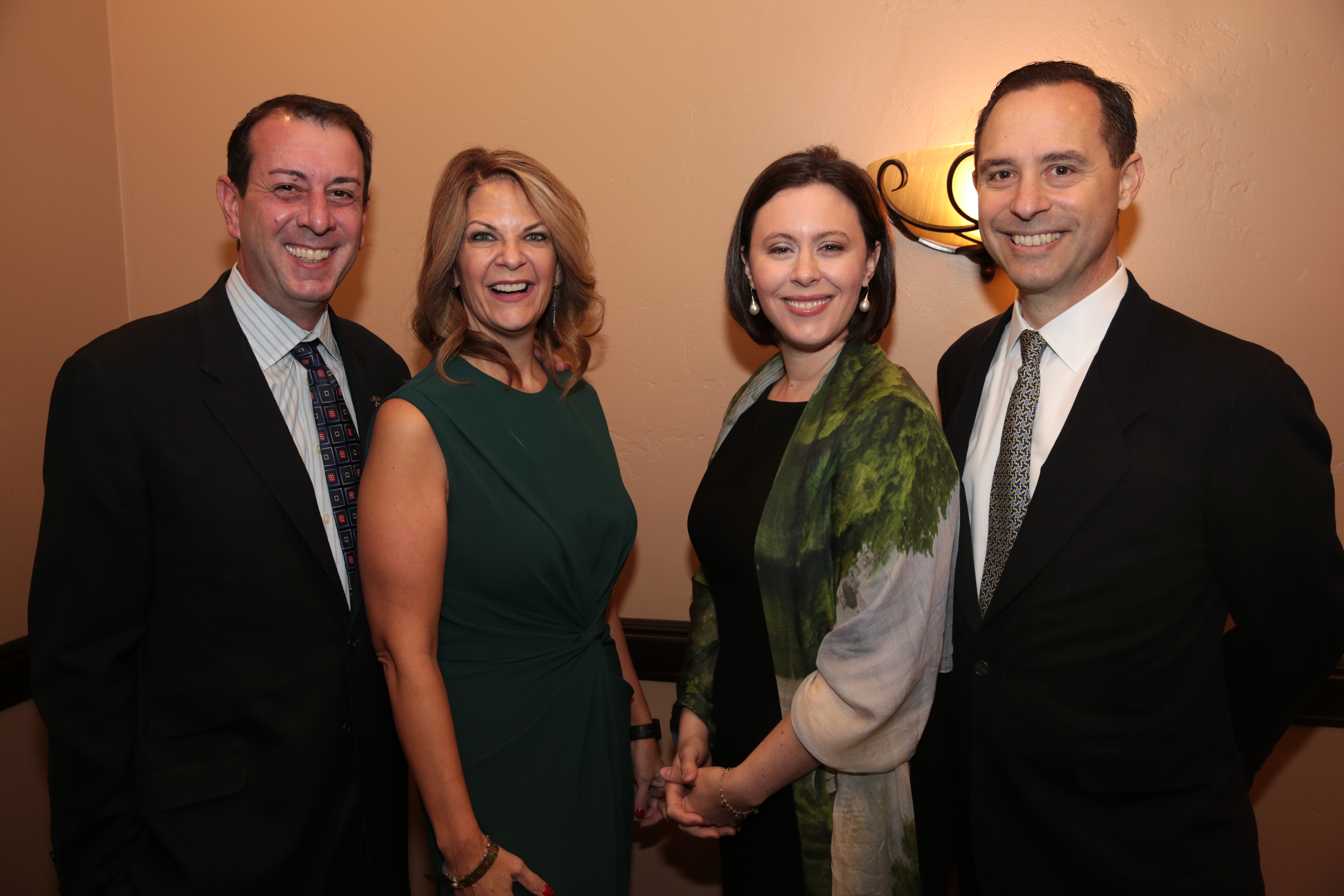
Left to right: Seth Leibsohn, Kelli Ward, Mary Kissel, and Buskirk (2017)

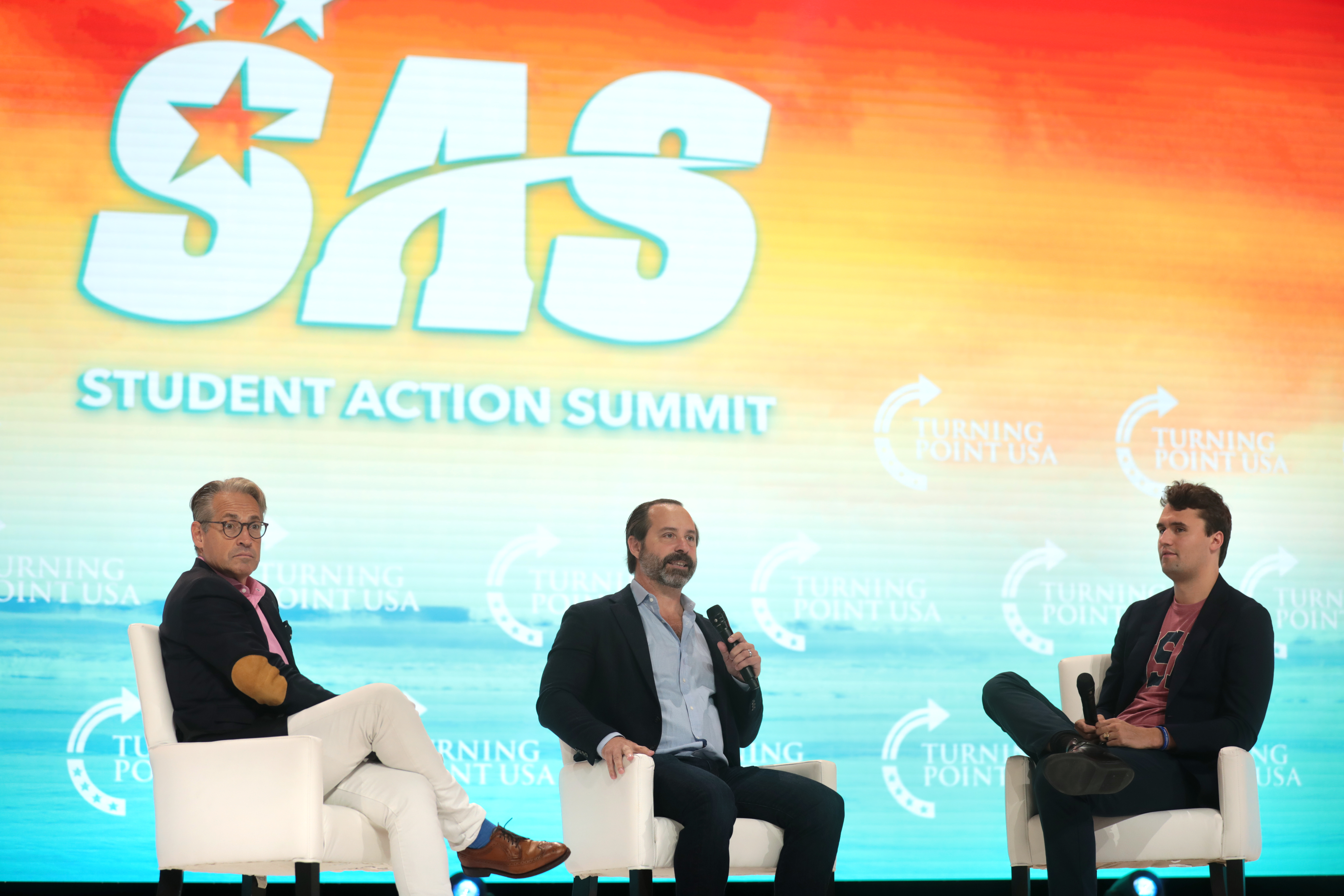
Eric Metaxas, Buskirk, and Charlie Kirk at the 2020 Turning Point USA Student Action Summit

He hosts a podcast called Downstream Politics, had an AM radio show with Seth Leibsohn, and ran a podcast called The Chris Buskirk Show, hosting guests like JD Vance and Roger Kimball. He has spoken at the Aspen Ideas Festival, at Turning Point USA events, and at the 2019 and 2021 National Conservatism Conference, and attended a dinner with Jair Bolsonaro when he was president of Brazil. Buskirk has also appeared as a political commentator on CNN and MSNBC's Hardball with Chris Matthews.

=== Rockbridge Network ===
In 2019, Buskirk and JD Vance co-founded the Rockbridge Network, which helped fund Trump's presidential campaign and ran get-out-the-vote operations for the 2024 presidential election. Vance has described Buskirk as an original thinker who understood how ideas, organization, and funding could lead to lasting Republican success.

By 2024, Rockbridge had an estimated 150 to 200 members and a projected election-cycle budget of $70 million to $80 million. Its affiliated organization supported polling, voter mobilization, investigative journalism, and political outreach.

=== 1789 Capital ===
In 2022, Buskirk co-founded conservative venture capital firm 1789 Capital with Omeed Malik and Rebekah Mercer. Buskirk currently serves as CIO of the firm.

Buskirk has invested in growth-stage companies in financial services, real estate, digital marketing, consumer brands, and media. His investments have included Rumble and Patriot Mobile.

Before founding 1789 Capital, Buskirk founded and sold businesses in insurance, reinsurance, specialty lending, and tax credit financing. They included JAS Intermediaries/Diversified Risk Management Holdings, Nexteco Energy Capital, Crucible Energy Partners and America's Cash Express. Nexteco and Crucible financed renewable energy installations.

=== Executive Branch social club ===
Buskirk helped launch Executive Branch, a members-only social club in the Georgetown neighborhood of Washington, D.C. Membership costs $500,000. The club is intended as a gathering place for business leaders and government officials aligned with President Trump.

=== Turnout for America ===
Buskirk leads Turnout for America, a super PAC associated with the Rockbridge Network. During the 2024 presidential campaign, the group participated in a field operation that planned to deploy about 5,000 canvassers in seven swing states. In 2026, it announced plans to spend more than $50 million on voter-turnout efforts in the midterm elections.

== Political views ==
Buskirk describes himself as a conservative and has published numerous articles in support of Donald Trump and the MAGA conservative movement. He once defined American conservatism as "the belief that human nature is immutable, is knowable in its most important distinctiveness, that legitimate government exists to secure the life and property of its citizens, to protect the family, the church, and to enable them to exercise authority within their rightful domains." He has stated that he believes conservative government should center around "government, family, [and] church", which he describes as "the pillars of civilization." He often intertwines his religion (Presbyterian) and his political views, and he has connections with the Christian Dominionism movement, which has led progressive magazine Mother Jones to label him a "TheoBro". One of these connections is through American Reformer, where he is a member of the board.

According to Buskirk, “You either have an extractive elite — an oligarchy — or you have a productive elite — an aristocracy — in every society," and society needs an aristocracy, which he defines as “a proper elite that takes care of the country and governs it well so that everyone prospers.”

Buskirk has spoken in support of Bitcoin, characterizing it as an "apolitical network" that can be used to solve problems with the economy.

== Political activities ==
The Washington Post has described Buskirk as a central organizer within a network of technology and business donors who are involved in conservative politics. According to the newspaper, Buskirk helped connect tech investors, entrepreneurs, and political figures within the MAGA movement.

For example, the Rockbridge Network that he co-founded brings together donors, investors, and activists who support conservative initiatives. The network hosts conferences and events to coordinate funding, candidates, and policy ideas within the Republican Party. Oren Cass, chief economist of American Compass, described Buskirk as “the convener” of a network of organizations that supports the MAGA movement.

== Boards of directors ==
Buskirk served on the board of Colombier Acquisition Corp. II from 2023 to July 2025. In 2026, he joined the board of Colombier Acquisition Corp. III, a special-purpose acquisition company listed on the New York Stock Exchange.

== Personal life ==
Buskirk has a family office in Scottsdale, Arizona. He and his wife, Gina Buskirk, live in Paradise Valley, Arizona. They have four children. In 2010, the Buskirks co-founded a prepared food business called Gina's Homemade. The business specialized in Italian cuisine, especially cheeses and cakes, based on recipes from Gina's family. Gina's Homemade became Gina At Home in 2014 and sold goods to restaurants and retailers, including Whole Foods Market.

Buskirk has said that he is Presbyterian and attends a Presbyterian church.

He is a confidant of Peter Thiel, and is friends with Robert F. Kennedy Jr. and JD Vance. Friends describe Buskirk as a determined and perceptive strategist, rather than a strongly partisan figure.

== See also ==
- Ann Coulter
- Charlie Kirk
- Conservatism in the United States
- Emmett Tyrrell
- The Heritage Foundation
- List of Claremont McKenna College people
- List of people from Arizona
- Project 2025
