= American Majority =

Us conservative organization

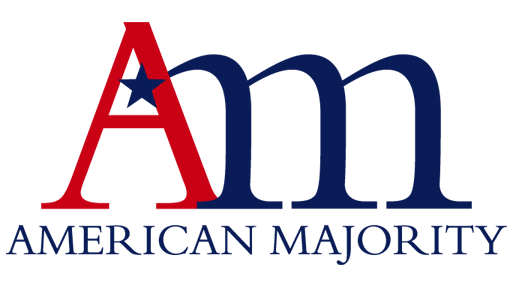
- Formation: 2008
- Type: Non-profit
- Legal status: Active
- Headquarters: Purcellville, Virginia
- Region served: United States
- President: Ned Ryun
- Affiliations: American Majority Action
- Budget: Revenue: $4.11 million Expenses: $2.75 million (2024)
- Website: www.americanmajority.org

American Majority is a nonprofit organization that provides training to conservative activists and political candidates in the United States. It is registered as a 501(c)(3) non-profit organization.

== Overview ==
American Majority is registered as a 501(c)(3) non-profit organization. The organization began as an affiliate of the Sam Adams Alliance. The president of American Majority is Ned Ryun, a former presidential writer for George W. Bush and the son of former Republican U.S. Congressman Jim Ryun. Headquartered in Purcellville, Virginia, the organization conducts trainings across the country and has offices in Vermont and Wisconsin. American Majority opened its Wisconsin office in October 2010.

== Activities ==
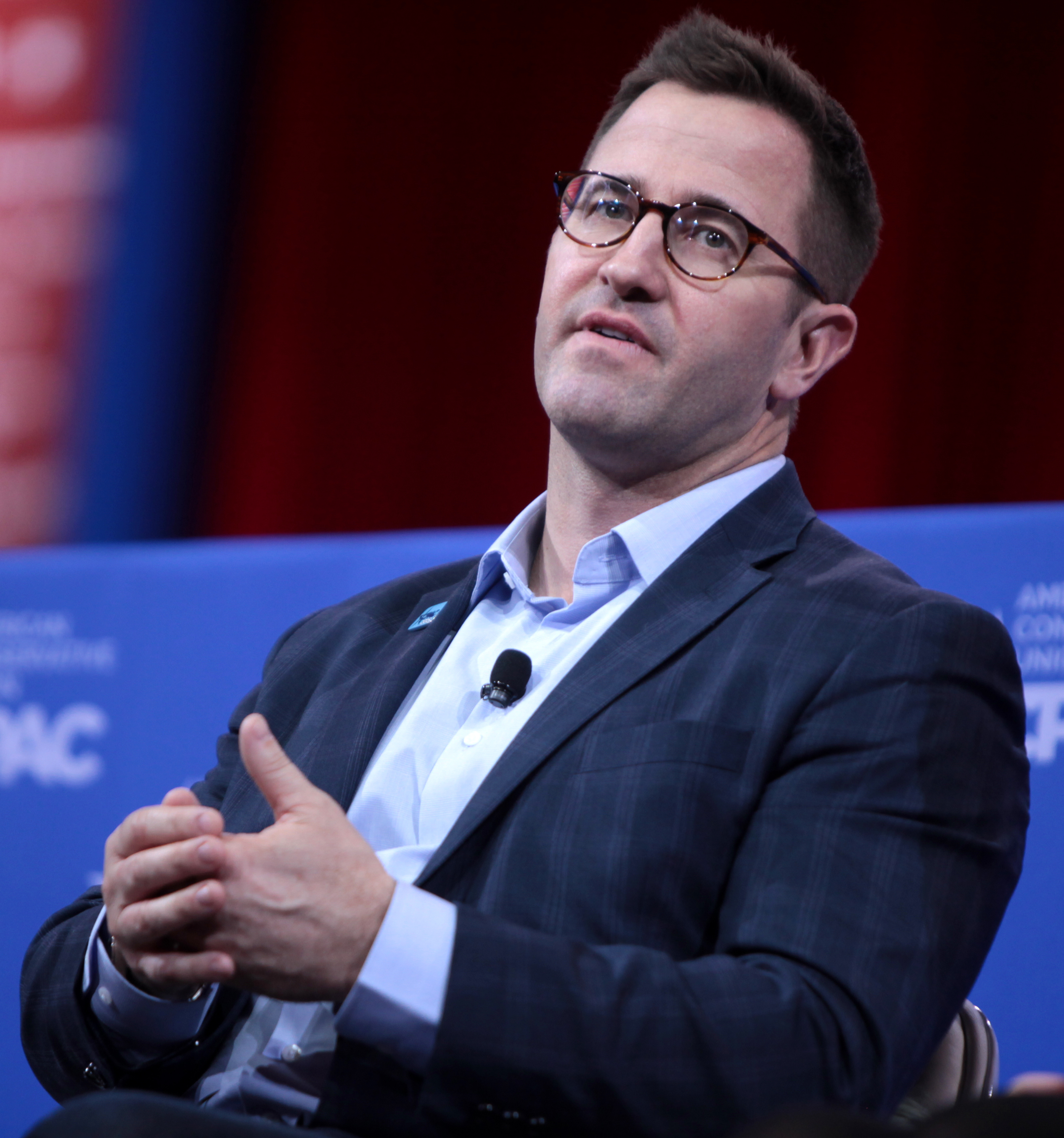
Ned Ryun, President of American Majority

The organization makes use of social media to disseminate their opinions and electoral information, and publishes guides illustrating the basics of social media. They provide guides on how to use Twitter and Facebook for political purposes.

In 2010, 8 of 12 school board candidates that the organization trained in Oklahoma were elected. The organization also trained the state's superintendent of public instruction, Janet Barresi, who was elected in 2010.

When the 2011 Wisconsin protests began, American Majority organized a rally in support of Scott Walker in Madison, Wisconsin. American Majority also sponsored training sessions in Wisconsin to assist in efforts to support Governor Walker.

On the one year anniversary of Andrew Breitbart's passing, American Majority hosted a training aimed at equipping activists with tools to carry Breitbart's legacy forward.

In October 2011, American Majority's president, Ned Ryun, called on Michele Bachmann to drop out of the Republican presidential primary.

American Majority Racing was a national program of American Majority. The program was designed to target millions of NASCAR fans in an effort to register and urge conservatives to vote in the November elections 2012 elections. Having partnered with NASCAR driver Jason Bowles and car #81 MacDonald Motorsports for the 2012 NASCAR Nationwide Series racing season, the American Majority Racing program was designed to educate Americans about how smaller government and less spending will “Keep America Free.”

In the spring of 2014, American Majority-trained candidates helped flip the Menomonee Falls Village Board and Kenosha Unified School Board from having liberal majorities to conservative control.

As of 2015, American Majority's Wisconsin chapter had trained 128 successful candidates for state or local office and held 140 trainings in the state. Wisconsin elected officials trained by American Majority include Assemblyman Michael Schraa, Ozaukee County Judge Joe Voiland, former Wisconsin State Senator Pam Galloway, Assemblyman Paul Tittl, former Assemblyman Evan Wynn, and Assemblyman Dave Murphy.

== See also ==
- American Majority Action
