= Megha Rajagopalan =

American political journalist

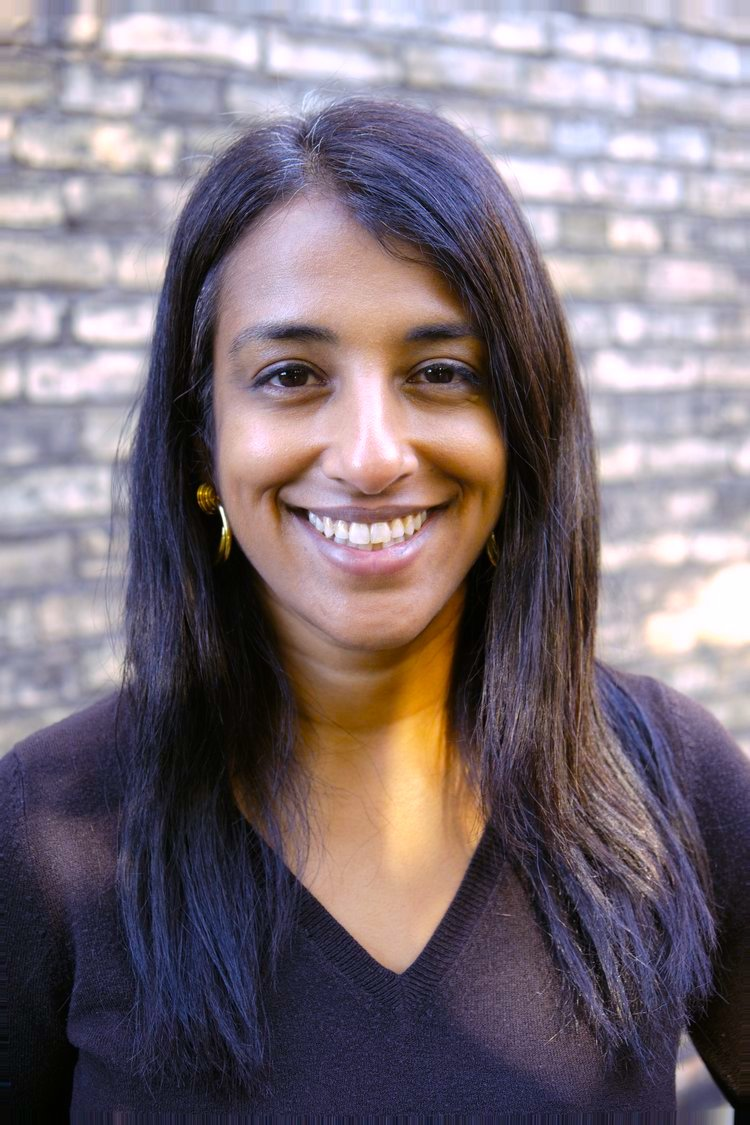
Megha Rajagopalan in 2021

Megha Rajagopalan is an American journalist of Indian descent who works at The New York Times. She won the 2021 Pulitzer Prize for International Reporting at BuzzFeed News "for a series of clear and compelling stories that used satellite imagery and architectural expertise, as well as interviews with two dozen former prisoners, to identify a vast new infrastructure built by the Chinese government for the mass detention of Muslims" (Uighurs).

Rajagopalan, who was a 2010 Fulbright Fellow to China, speaks Mandarin. She has reported from 23 countries in Asia and the Middle East on stories ranging from the North Korean nuclear crisis to the peace process in Afghanistan.

In 2018, she was forced from China, where she was living at the time, likely because of her work on sensitive issues such as surveillance and the incarceration of ethnic minorities.

Rajagopalan graduated in 2008 from the Philip Merrill College of Journalism at the University of Maryland, and has been the recipient of several prizes including the 2020 Kim Wall Award from the Overseas Press Club of America and the Mirror Award for reporting on the misuse of social media. She was also a finalist for the 2021 Orwell Prize.
