= Capital News Service (Maryland) =

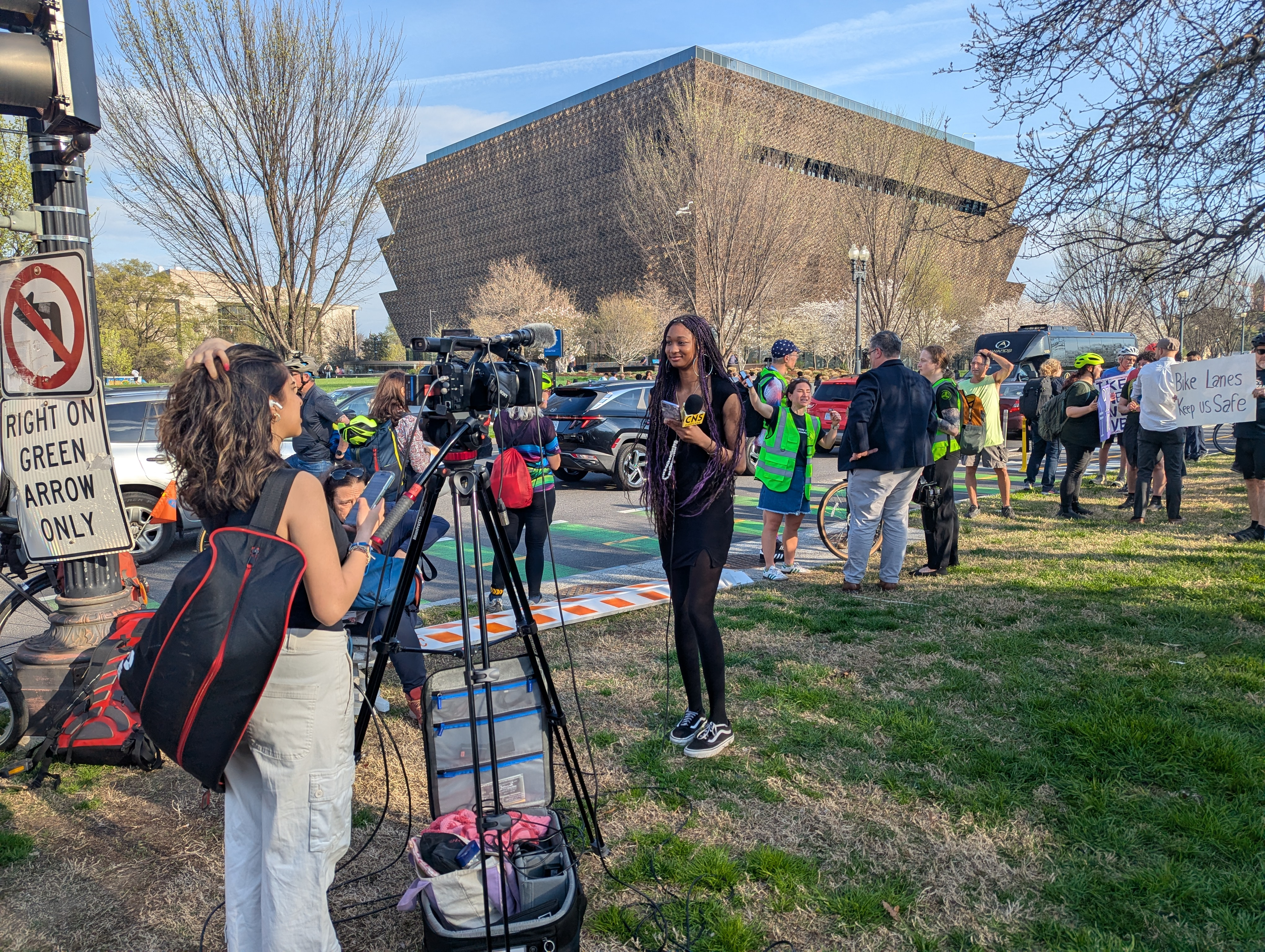
Capital News Service reporters documenting a protest

The Capital News Service (CNS) is a news wire affiliated with the University of Maryland, College Park.

== Facilitating student reporting ==
Operated by the Philip Merrill College of Journalism at the University of Maryland, Capital News Service provides students with real-life reporting experiences—covering a beat, developing sources, generating story ideas and writing on deadline—all in close consultation with an instructor/editor.

Capital News Service operates across all platforms: Print bureaus in Annapolis and Washington, D.C., provide a daily news feed to scores of clients, including daily and weekly newspapers, wire services, radio, television and online news outlets; the broadcast bureau produces a nightly newscast that goes to more than 400,000 households in suburban Washington; and an online newsmagazine, Maryland Newsline, does original news and feature reporting while showcasing work from the print and broadcast operations.

The print bureaus transmit about 300 stories each semester for publication. Each student typically produces 25 to 30 stories that are usually picked up by several clients, giving students as many as 90 clips for the semester. CNS news, feature and investigative stories often appear on A1 of client papers, and have appeared in The Washington Post, The (Baltimore) Sun and The Washington Times. Select stories are sent to the McClatchy-Tribune News Service for distribution, and have appeared in The Philadelphia Inquirer, The Pittsburgh Post-Gazette and the San Jose (Calif.) Mercury News, among other papers. The program has led directly to top internships and reporting jobs for most CNS alumni.

Selected Merrill College of Journalism undergraduates and graduate students in the public affairs reporting sequence receive 12 credits in their bureau semester. The program is divided into three sections:

Bureau

Students receive six credits for acting as full-time (35 to 40 hours a week) reporters from Tuesday through Friday, covering either Annapolis or Washington for Capital News Service.

Press Seminar

Participants also are enrolled in an upper-level journalism seminar on Mondays with Knight Chair Haynes Johnson, one of the college's Pulitzer Prize–winning faculty members. The class explores various topics in public affairs reporting, often with guest lecturers.

Public Affairs Seminar or Advanced Writing Course

Students can receive their final three credits from a School of Public Policy class designed specifically for the bureau program or by taking an advanced writing or reporting course with the college's award-winning faculty.

== CNS clients ==
=== Daily newspapers ===
- The Washington Post
- The Baltimore Sun
- The Washington Times
- McClatchy-Tribune Information Services
- The Baltimore Examiner
- The Washington Examiner
- The (Annapolis) Capital
- Hagerstown Herald-Mail
- Frederick News-Post
- Carroll County Times
- The (Salisbury) Daily Times
- Cumberland Times-News
- Cambridge Daily Banner
- Easton Star-Democrat
- Daily Record

=== Weekly and monthly newspapers ===
- The Afro-American
- The Baltimore Guide
- The Calvert Recorder
- The (St. Mary's) County Times
- Dundalk Eagle
- The Eagle News
- The Enterprise (St. Mary's County)
- The (Frederick) County Globe
- The (Garrett County) Republican
- Gazette Newspapers (42 editions)
- The Insurance Advisor Monthly
- The Maryland Independent (Charles County)
- Montgomery Sentinel
- Montgomery Times
- Patuxent Newspapers (12 editions)
- Prince George's Post
- Prince George's Sentinel
- St. Mary's Today
- Street Sense
- The Takoma Voice
- The Washington Informer

=== Online news websites ===
- The Bay Net
- The Calvert News
- FoxNews.com
- shoreupdate.com
- Southern Maryland Online
- stateline.org
- Maryland Newsline
- washingtonpost.com

=== Broadcast outlets ===
- Maryland Public Television
- WTOP News Radio
- CTV-76 (Community Television of Prince George's County)
- UMTV
