= Law Street Media =

Law Street Media is an open-access web-based media platform covering law and public policy.

The company has offices in New York City and Washington, D.C.

== History ==
Law Street Media was founded in 2013 by John A. Jenkins. His goal was to bring news stories relating to the law and policy worlds to readers 35 and younger.

In 2015, the company was named in Publishers Weekly's "Survival Test: Startup Review of 2015" as a top company to watch.

In 2016, Law Street Media partnered with Credo Reference to publish its Issue Briefs feature, designed primarily for students conducting research.

== Content ==
The company was known in its first year for its "Crime in America" feature, which ranks cities in the U.S. based on crime and safety.

In 2014, the company began releasing its annual rankings of law schools.

In 2016, it launched a "Cannabis" section in which it tracked marijuana legalization state by state, along with related stories. On the same day, it launched its Issue Briefs section, which provides unbiased reporting on current events.

== See also ==
- Law and the Multiverse
- Courthouse News Service
