= Kenneth P. Miller =

American political scientist

Kenneth P. Miller (born September 21, 1963) is a professor of Government at Claremont McKenna College, specializing in state politics, policy, and law. Miller is the Director of the Rose Institute of State and Local Government, a research institute known for its expertise in redistricting, elections, demographic research, polling, and public policy analysis. He has written extensively on state politics and policy, direct democracy, constitutional law, courts, and political polarization.

== Education ==
Miller has a B.A. from Pomona College, where he majored in Government (1985), and a J.D. from Harvard Law School (1988). In 2002, he received a Ph.D. in political science from the University of California at Berkeley.

== Career ==
Prior to his academic career, Miller was an attorney with the law firm Morrison & Foerster and in 1991 co-founded the firm's Sacramento office.

Upon completion of his Ph.D., Miller taught for one year at the University of San Francisco before moving to Claremont McKenna College in 2003. He became Associate Director of the Rose Institute of State and Local Government in 2009. In 2014, he became the founding co-director of Dreier Roundtable, a program that organizes discussions by political leaders, scholars, and others from a broad range of viewpoints, and provides support for students interested in national politics and policy. In 2020, he was named the Don H. and Edessa Rose Associate Professor of State and Local Government at Claremont McKenna College.

== Scholarship ==
Miller is the author or co-author of several books and articles regarding state and national politics, policy, and law. His book Texas vs. California: A History of the Struggle for the Future of America (Oxford 2020) explores why the nation’s two largest states have polarized politically, and how they have assumed leadership of the nation’s red and blue state blocs. His book Direct Democracy and the Courts (Cambridge 2009) analyzes the initiative process within the checks and balances system, and has been called “the standard work on the relationship between the judiciary and direct democracy.” Other works include Parchment Barriers: Political Polarization and the Limits of Constitutional Order (Kansas 2018) (co-edited with Zachary Courser and Eric Helland) and The New Political Geography of California (Berkeley Public Policy Press 2008) co-edited with Frederick Douzet and Thad Kousser. He also has published articles on topics including the California Supreme Court, state constitutions, and voting rights.

== Rose Institute of State and Local Government ==
Miller served as Associate Director of the Rose Institute of State and Local Government from 2008-2021. He became the Rose Institute’s director on July 1, 2021. The Rose Institute was founded at Claremont McKenna College in 1973. Its mission is “to enhance the education of students at CMC, to produce high quality research, and to promote public understanding on issues of state and local government, politics, and policy, with an emphasis on California.”

As part of his work for the Rose Institute, Miller has helped introduced new projects and areas of research. These include the following:

The Miller-Rose Institute Initiative Database, developed as the empirical basis for Miller’s 2009 book Direct Democracy and the Courts, is regularly updated to provide a summary of all voter-approved ballot initiatives throughout the United States from 1904 to 2023. The database contains more than 1,000 voter-approved initiatives from 24 states that use the initiative process. The database also summarizes and analyzes legal challenges to these ballot measures as well as the courts’ treatment of such cases.

Miller also supervises the Institute's Video Voter Guide, which provides the public non-partisan, online video summaries of California state ballot measures.

Under Miller's leadership, the Rose Institute has published the Inland Empire Outlook, an online periodical featuring "economic and political analyses focusing on the Inland Empire."

Miller has also worked with Claremont McKenna College Government Professor J. Andrew Sinclair to expand the Rose Institute’s polling program. In 2022, the Rose Institute conducted its first national pre-election poll, in partnership with YouGov. The poll produced two reports: Red vs. Blue States: Competing Visions for 2022 and 2024 and Battleground Pennsylvania: The 2022 Midterm Election.

As part of his 2020 book, Texas vs. California, Miller analyzed California’s competitive strengths and vulnerabilities. This topic has become a central theme of several Rose Institute projects, including the Kosmont-Rose Institute Cost of Doing Business Survey and the Institute’s research on the California housing crisis and potential policy interventions.

== Perry v. Schwarzenegger ==
In January 2010, Miller appeared in federal court as an expert witness in Perry v. Schwarzenegger, the case that challenged California's Proposition 8 of 2008 and sought to establish a federal constitutional right of same-sex couples to marry. Miller was presented to the court as an expert in California and American politics to testify regarding the political power of gays and lesbians in California and the United States, an issue potentially relevant in determining the appropriate level of judicial scrutiny to apply to the law. Miller testified that the plaintiffs’ claim that gays and lesbians are politically powerless, thus deserving special protective intervention by the courts, ignored evidence that in several respects this group wields significant political power and can effectively pursue its goals through political institutions. Miller cited support for same-sex marriage rights by media organizations, unions, corporations, the Democratic Party, and California's leading elected officials (including the governor at the time, Arnold Schwarzenegger).

== Other affiliations ==
Miller is a member of the California State Bar Association and the American Political Science Association. He has been a visiting scholar at Princeton University's James Madison Program in American Ideals and Institutions (2011-2012) and Southern Methodist University’s John Goodwin Tower Center for Public Policy and International Affairs (2017-2018).

== Selected published works ==
- Texas vs. California: A History of Their Struggle for the Future of America (Oxford 2020) ISBN 0-19-007736-0
- Parchment Barriers: Political Polarization and the Limits of Constitutional Order (co-editor) (Kansas 2018) ISBN 0-7006-2713-8
- Direct Democracy and the Courts (Cambridge 2009) ISBN 0-521-74771-6
- The New Political Geography of California (co-editor) (Berkeley Public Policy Press 2008). ISBN 0-87772-426-1
