= Alan Heslop =

American academic

David Alan Heslop (born 1938) is an American academic and government consultant and advisor.

He was born in 1938 in England and gained BA and MA degrees from Magdalen College, Oxford. He later became a naturalized American citizen, and gained his PhD from the University of Texas.

Heslop taught for four decades at Claremont McKenna College, where he served as Executive Vice President and Dean of the Faculty, and was the founding director of the Rose Institute of State and Local Government. His current academic appointment is as a senior research fellow in the School of Politics and Economics at Claremont Graduate University.

Heslop held senior staff and consulting positions in the California Legislature, and served as research director for a number of California statewide and local initiatives. He was a Congressional Fellow and a consultant to the Committee on Administration in the U.S. House of Representatives.

Heslop served on several advisory commissions, including the California Constitution Revision Commission (1994–97). In 1985 he was appointed by President Ronald Reagan to be the Chairman of the National Advisory Council on Educational Research and Improvement and was reappointed to that position by President George H. W. Bush in 1989. He has been a consultant on education and other subjects to many organizations in the U.S. and abroad.

In June 2014, Heslop was sentenced to 21 months in federal prison after pleading guilty to one count of felony conspiracy to commit bribery for his role in a kickback scheme that bilked the Twentynine Palms Band of Mission Indians out of hundreds of thousands of dollars.
