= Rockbridge Network =

American political advocacy group

- Formation: 2019; 7 years ago
- Founders: JD Vance and Chris Buskirk
- Purpose: Political advocacy

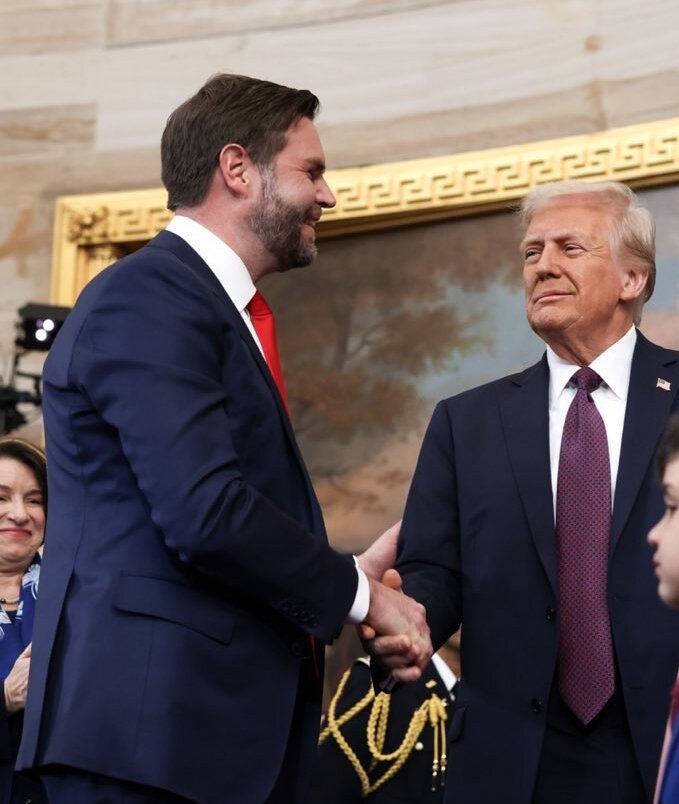
Vance and Trump at the second inauguration of Donald Trump

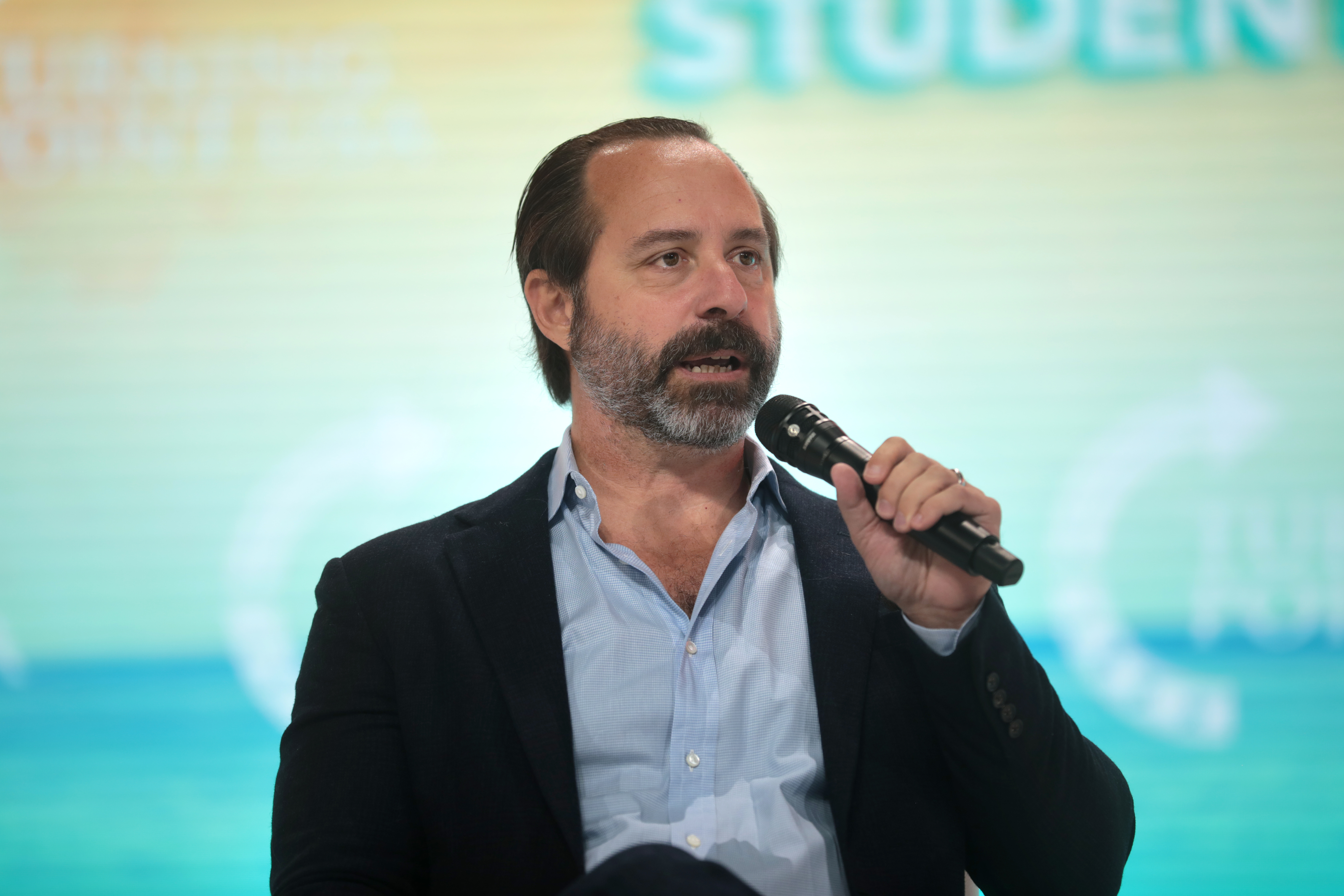
Buskirk at a Turning Point USA event, 2020

The Rockbridge Network is an American conservative political advocacy group founded by JD Vance and Chris Buskirk. The group has been backed by Silicon Valley investors and become known for its connections to investors in the tech industry, as well as to the second Donald Trump administration.

== Purpose, organization, and methodology ==
Rockbridge describes itself as "a kind of political venture capital firm". In 2022, the organization circulated a brochure that read:

Our goal is to bring together investors who are dissatisfied with the status quo of politics and raise capital to fund projects that will disrupt but advance the Republican agenda. We are focused on supporting people and projects that can end the decline and revitalize our country. [...] The Rockbridge Network will replace the current Republican ecosystem of think tanks, media organizations and activist groups that have contributed to the Party's decline with better action-oriented, more effective people and institutions that are focused on winning.

The brochure outlines some of the organization's specific "projects" and plans to achieve their goals. One goal is to "build a political coalition that will win national elections with 55% of the popular vote". Another goal, which it addresses through its "Rockbridge Media Project", involves "building a new conservative ecosystem" by funding various media initiatives. The "Lawfare & Strategic Litigation" project proposes to use "strategic litigation" to "use the law as a weapon" and "identify leverage points where the law allows [it] to hold bad actors, including the media, accountable". The "Rockbridge Transition Project" proposes to "create a 'government-in-waiting' with the people and the plans to staff the next Republican Administration" in order to "govern effectively with conservative goals, from day one". The "Red State Project", which in 2021 had a larger budget per state than any of the other projects combined, was designed to consolidate Republican control in various states. It accused "the left" of investing "heavily in state-level infrastructure to turn red states blue" and said that Rockbridge was "building a centralized, organizing force in each state by hiring staff to coordinate like-minded groups to ensure we win". Another project indicates the group's interest in redistricting, saying, "efforts to influence the new Congressional maps are underway and are [sic] results are trending favorably." The brochure says Rockbridge participated in "bringing together and coordinating the activities of the conservative coalition", including "life groups, Second Amendment groups, free enterprise, immigration, education choice and excellence, [and] faith" groups.

Reuters reported that Rockbridge "seeks to influence U.S. politics through a centrally controlled network of right-wing political groups backed by some of the same deep-pocketed tech investors who helped bankroll Vance's political rise".

=== Rockbridge groups ===
According to The New York Times, Rockbridge "steers" eight organizations, "including four dark-money 501(c)(4) organizations, two super PACs, a donor-advised 501(c)(3) fund for nonprofit activity and the Rockbridge Network umbrella organization, an LLC". Buskirk's super PAC, Turnout for America, raised over $25 million in 2024. The Washington Post reported that, as of November 2025, none of the Rockbridge groups had their own websites or much of a public footprint.

==== Better Tomorrow ====
Better Tomorrow is a nonprofit organization based in Richmond, Virginia. Reuters characterized it as a "get-out-the-vote operation". In 2023, Better Tomorrow gave grants to American Encore, The Faithful in Action, and Firebrand Action, and received a grant from American Water, which "makes grants to public charities based on matching employee contributions", according to CauseIQ. Members of the organization include president director Buskirk; directors Roger Kimball and Ned Ryun; and treasurer Janna Rutland.

==== The Faithful in Action ====
Faithful in Action was incorporated in 2023 in Cheyenne, Wyoming, with Buskirk as president. According to Reuters, its mission is to "recruit churchgoers into political activism".

==== Firebrand Action ====
Firebrand Action, incorporated in 2022 in Glen Allen, Virginia, handles "Rockbridge's efforts to influence journalism", according to Reuters. Its website said its mission was to be a group that "revolutionizes and turbocharges Republican political media, strategy, and messaging", and that they "challenge the political status quo and promote strong and persuasive pro-American messaging at all levels of dialogue." According to CauseIQ, "Firebrand Action conducted outreach efforts focused on educating the general public about the benefits of populist public policies." (Note: See also: Populism)

In October 2024, Reuters reported that state records listed James Blair as its secretary, and that Blair resigned from Firebrand before joining the Trump campaign. Buskirk is the group's president and Janna Rutland is treasurer.

==== Over the Horizon Action ====
Over the Horizon Action is based in Arlington, Virginia, and located in Washington, D.C. Conservative activist Ned Ryun was listed as the director in 2023. According to CauseIQ, "Over the Horizon Action conducts legal and public policy research" and is "engaged in nonpartisan voter registration efforts and outreach to educate voters on the ways in which public policies impact economic growth". Reuters also characterized it as a "get-out-the-vote operation".

The organization has received funding from Better Tomorrow and has issued grants to Firebrand Action and the Schwab Charitable Fund. Robert F. Kennedy Jr. received $100,000 from Over the Horizon Action for speaking at the Rockbridge Fall Summit on November 7, 2024.

== History ==
The Rockbridge Network was founded in 2019 by JD Vance and Chris Buskirk. According to The New York Times, the organization started to form when "Buskirk began informally hosting a series of small dinners with the hopes of laying groundwork for Mr. Vance’s political career and, eventually, of building a Trump-aligned alternative to the Koch Network." Rockbridge was reportedly named after Rockbridge, Ohio, where one of these early meetings was held in a resort. The group held its first official summit in Arizona in 2021.

The group was first reported on in 2022 by The New York Times, after it held a meeting at Mar-a-Lago. At that meeting, Buskirk, Omeed Malik, and Rebekah Mercer reportedly "started discussing how to finance a 'parallel economy' of conservative businesses", and this discussion led to the founding of 1789 Capital.

The Rockbridge Network had a significant budget for the 2024 U.S. elections. In April 2024, Donald Trump called in to a meeting the group was hosting at Mar-a-Lago. Donald Trump Jr. has also spoken with the group, as has James Blair, a political director for the Trump campaign who became the White House Deputy Chief of Staff in the Trump administration.

After the 2024 election, Rockbridge held its annual fall summit. Robert F. Kennedy Jr., who became the U.S. Secretary of Health and Human Services in February 2025, spoke at the summit. The New York Times reported that the electoral victory "made Rockbridge suddenly a hot ticket" and that for some attendees the organization had raised the minimum price of attendance from $5,000 to $25,000.

Around the jubilant open bars and music-filled ballrooms, attendees openly traded notes on what Trump administration roles they might get and debated whether Mr. Musk was the world's most powerful person.

In June 2025, media reports described plans for Rockbridge to establish a regional division in Asia, with a regional headquarters in Seoul and proposed branches in Taiwan and Japan. Some publications noted that this plan coincided with the early days of Lee Jae Myung's presidency, and a The Korea Herald reporter said the organization is "expected to serve as a proxy diplomatic channel to Washington on key issues such as trade and defense, given its central base in Korea, adjacent to key US allies and China amid rising tensions". Rockbridge officially established the Seoul-based think tank Rockbridge Korea in September 2025; its first general meeting was on September 24.

In October 2026, Brazilian supreme court justice Flávio Dino ordered the Brazilian police to investigate potential connections between the Rockbridge Network and the 2026 presidential campaign of Flávio Bolsonaro. It is a crime in Brazil for a political candidate to accept foreign funding or other foreign aid. Rockbridge denied any connection.

== Donors, members, and connections ==
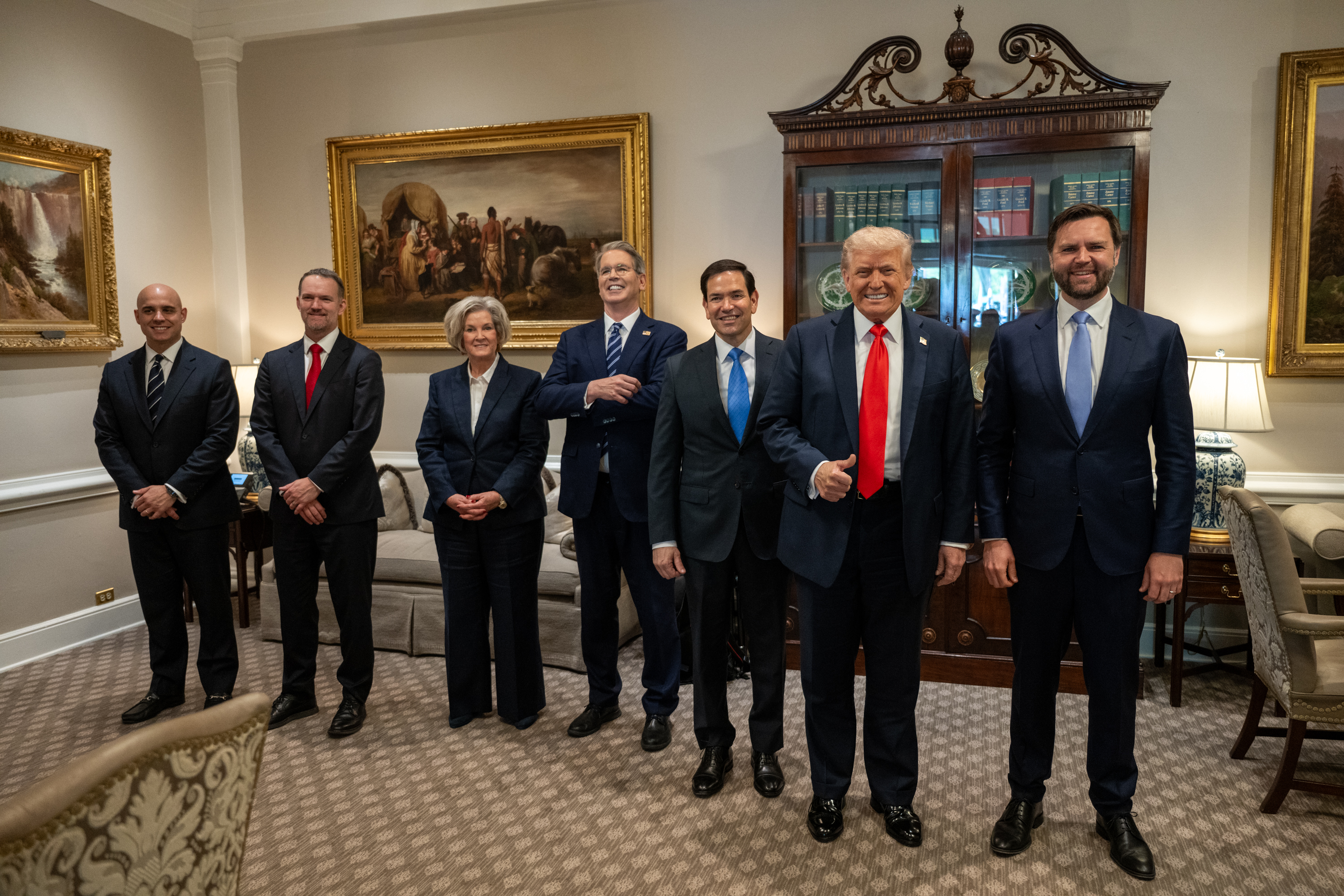
Multiple people associated with the Rockbridge Network became important figures in Trump's second administration. Some of them are pictured here: James Blair, Scott Bessent, Marco Rubio, and JD Vance.

The group is backed by Silicon Valley figures, including some without a history of political donations or investments. Other funds come from traditional Republican donors looking for new, innovative organizations to give to.

Major donors include Rebekah Mercer, Tyler Winklevoss, Cameron Winklevoss, and Peter Thiel. Vance and Thiel have a long history of working together, with Thiel backing many of Vance's commercial and political ventures. Donald Trump Jr. is also a member.

As of November 2024, Rockbridge membership costs ranged from $100,000 for a "limited partner" to $1,000,000 for a "principal partner". The group had about 125 members in 2023 and about 150 by November 2024.

Rockbridge has held a number of meetings and conferences, including two annual summits. Speakers at these events have included Donald Trump, Donald Trump Jr., Tucker Carlson, Marc Andreessen, Blake Masters, Steve Wynn, David Sacks, Woody Johnson, Scott Bessent, Robert F. Kennedy Jr., Tulsi Gabbard, Steve Witkoff, Susie Wiles, Leonard Leo, Palmer Luckey, and Russell Brand. The New York Times also reported that Tom Emmer was slated to speak at a Rockbridge conference in April 2022. Other affiliates include Marco Rubio, Howard Lutnick, Ken Howery, and Luke Nosek.

Rockbridge Korea is headed by chairperson Kim Hae-young. Its board includes Chung Yong-jin (chair of Shinsegae Group), former Korean Prime Minister Kim Boo-kyum, former Finance Minister Bahk Jae-wan, Taiwanese businessman Richard Tsai of Fubon Financial Holding Co., and Park Byung-eun, head of 1789 Partners.

== Response ==
The New York Times wrote of the Rockbridge Network and other organizations that were fundraising outside the established fundraising mechanisms for the Republican party:

The willingness of donors to organize on their own underscores the migration of power and money away from the official organs of the respective parties, which are required to disclose their donors, to outside groups that often have few disclosure requirements.

On his podcast, America's Fractured Politics, Washington, D.C.-based activist and attorney Mark Mansour expressed concerns about the Rockbridge Network:

One of the most troubling aspects of Rockbridge's approach is the way it blurs the line between politics and business. By investing in companies that align with their ideological goals, they're creating a feedback loop where political power and economic power reinforce each other. This is a classic example of what political scientists call state capture, the process by which private interests take control of public institutions for their own benefit.

== See also ==
- America First Policies
- America PAC
- American Opportunity Alliance
- Cicero Institute
- Committee to Defeat the President
- Conservative Partnership Institute
- Executive Branch (club)
- Federal Election Campaign Act
- The Heritage Foundation
- List of political action committees
- Lobbying in the United States
- MAGA Inc.
- Matt Schlapp
- Paul Singer
- Preserve America PAC
- Project 2025
- Save America
- Vivek Ramaswamy
