= Ned Ryun =

American Alt-right activist

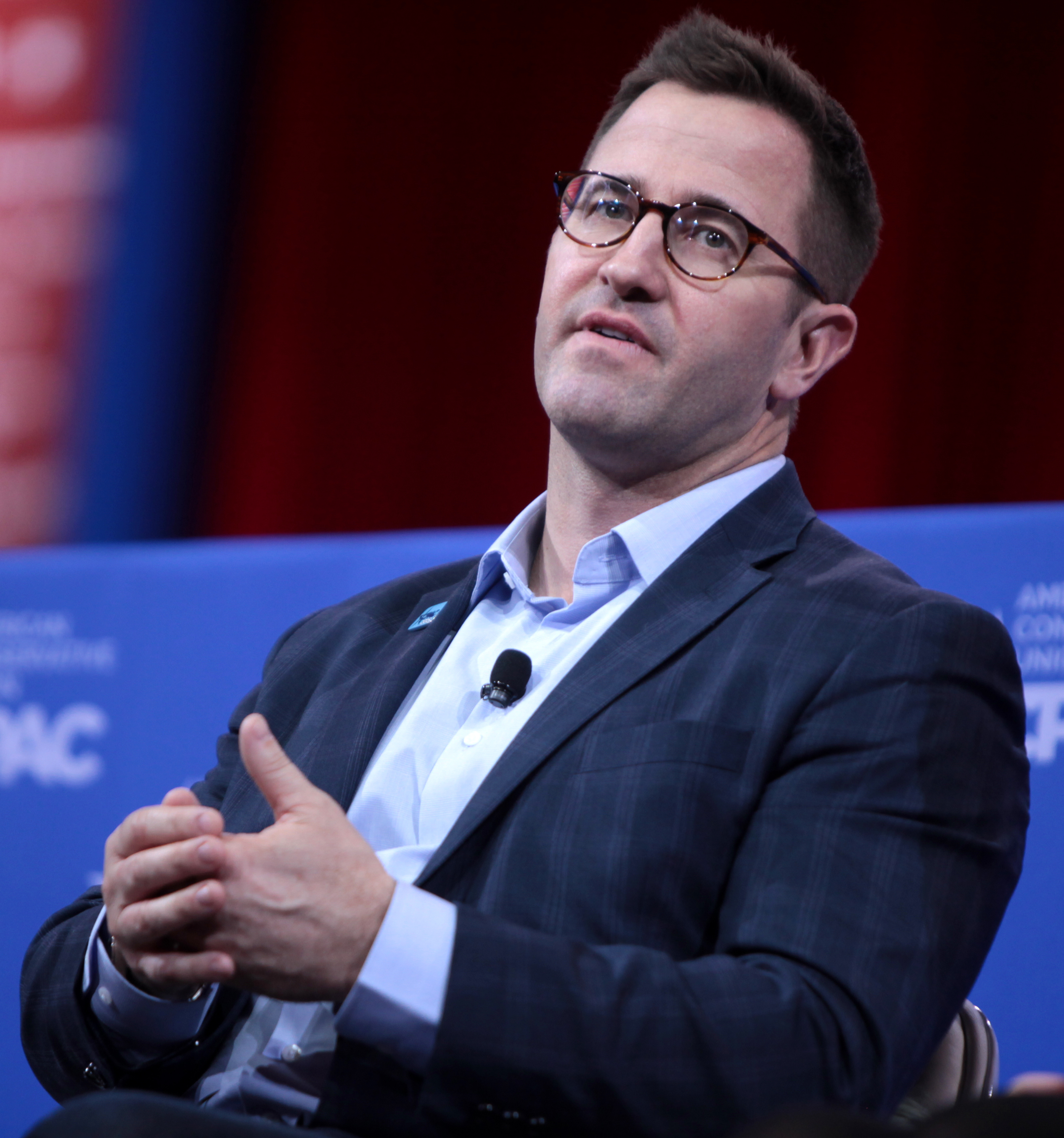
- Ryun speaking at CPAC in 2015
- Born: Santa Barbara, California, U.S.
- Education: University of Kansas
- Occupations: CEO, American Majority CEO, Voter Gravity
- Known for: Founder of American Majority
- Spouse: Becca Parker Ryun
- Parent(s): Anne and Jim Ryun
- Website: nedryun.com

Ned Ryun is an American conservative activist who is the founder and CEO of American Majority, a conservative organization that trains candidates and activists.

== Education and background ==
Ryun is the son of Jim Ryun, the former Republican congressman and distance runner.

== Career in government and as conservative activist ==
Ryun was a speechwriter for President George W. Bush. He is the founder and president of American Majority, a Virginia-based conservative political training institute allied with the Tea Party movement. The group was founded in 2008. Its 501(c)(4) affiliate is American Majority Action, of which Ryun was CEO. Ryun has been a board member of the American Conservative Union. During the 2011 Wisconsin protests against Republican Governor Scott Walker's proposal to restrict collective bargaining and organized labor, Ryun helped organize counter-demonstrations in favor of the legislation.

A career Republican Party operative, as of 2013 Ryun was the CEO of Voter Gravity, a Republican data firm used for the party's get out the vote efforts; the company created "tablet and smartphone accessible canvassing maps, walk lists, voter information and dialing tools." In 2016, Ryun was a long-shot candidate for the chairmanship of the Republican National Committee.

Ryun is a staunch ally of Donald Trump. In 2017, Ryun critiqued the Republican tax proposal for not going far enough, accusing the bill of being "a grab bag of goodies for the uberwealthy globalists." In September 2020, after Supreme Court Justice Ruth Bader Ginsburg died, Ryun pushed for Trump to fill the vacancy created by Ginsburg's death before the November 2020 presidential election. He pushed for Trump to nominate Amy Coney Barrett over Barbara Lagoa. Ryun was appointed by Trump to his 1776 Commission, which produced a report on American history that linked progressivism to fascism. The New York Times noted that the report was criticized by mainstream historians. In 2023 Ryun was listed as the Director of Over the Horizon Action, an organization linked to the Rockbridge Network, which has ties to the Trump administration.

Ryun has spoken in support of the second Trump administration; he has appeared on Fox News praising the administration for its efforts to reduce or eliminate federal grant money to universities and for the "somewhat punitive" tariffs that it has levied against some countries, and has said that critics and protesters of the Trump administration are "irrational" and called Trump derangement syndrome "an incurable disease".

=== Works ===
Ryun is the author of three books:

- The Adversaries: A Story of Boston and Bunker Hill (2021) ISBN 979-8514466689
- Restoring Our Republic: The Making of the Republic and How We Reclaim It Before It's Too Late (2019) ISBN 978-1705870778
- American Leviathan: The Birth of the Administrative State and Progressive Authoritarianism (2024) ISBN 978-1641774376

In addition, he has co-authored two books with his father and twin brother, Drew Ryun:

- Heroes Among Us (2002)
- The Courage to Run (Gospel Light Publications: 2006), ISBN 0-8307-3908-4
