= John A. Jenkins =

John A. Jenkins (born December 16, 1950) is an American journalist, author and businessman. He is Founder & CEO of Law Street Media and President & Publisher Emeritus of CQ Press in Washington, D.C.

Prior to founding Law Street, a web-based media company covering the world of law, in 2013, Jenkins served for 15 years as President & Publisher of CQ Press and created First Street, the pioneering web-based political intelligence platform. He has extensive board experience in the corporate, university, association, and philanthropic worlds. His corporate board experience includes SEC-reporting companies; as a journalist he specialized in securities and antitrust law. With media investment bank Jordan Edmiston Group, Jenkins led the auction that resulted in the sale of CQ Press to SAGE Publications (Thousand Oaks, CA) in 2008. He signed on as a member of the senior management team of SAGE for four years, reporting to the Global CEO. He remains President & Publisher Emeritus. Jenkins previously served as a division president of high-tech magazine publisher Ziff Davis, Inc., a subsidiary president of France Telecom, and, for 23 years, as an executive and member of the board of directors of BNA (now Bloomberg BNA), the Washington, D.C. information and publishing company.

== Career ==
=== As a reporter ===
Jenkins began his career in 1971 as a reporter for BNA covering the U.S. Justice Department and courts. He demonstrated an investigative streak from the start, breaking stories about corporate scandals that led to investigations by the Securities and Exchange Commission and the Watergate Special Prosecutor. In the summer of 1974, he scooped the world by revealing the Justice Department's intention to break apart the giant AT&T telephone monopoly. His story ran four months before the lawsuit was filed. He was named managing editor of BNA's flagship dailies at the age of 28. Two years later, he led BNA's entry into digital publishing, creating the electronic product line that now comprises almost the entirety of Bloomberg BNA's $350 million annual revenue.

=== As a journalist and author ===
As a journalist and author, Jenkins's work appeared in major magazines in the U.S. and abroad, including The New York Times Magazine, where he was a regular contributor from 1983 through 1987; GQ (American and British editions); The Washington Monthly; and The American Lawyer. He is a four-time recipient of the American Bar Association’s Gavel Award Certificate of Merit, the highest award in legal journalism, for his coverage of law and the courts. His historic article in The New York Times Magazine, “A Candid Talk with Justice Blackmun,” won the ABA award.

Jenkins's 1983 cover story about Supreme Court Justice Harry Blackmun, based on numerous interviews spanning many months, was his first assignment for The Times Magazine. Blackmun's blunt assessments of his colleagues and the court were unprecedented for a sitting justice, and they garnered headlines nationwide. Two years later, Justice William Rehnquist sat for similar interviews. Jenkins's cover story in The Times Magazine, entitled “The Partisan,” revealed new information about Rehnquist's conservative past and brought unwelcome attention to the justice, who vowed never again to cooperate in such an endeavor. Eleven years later, Rehnquist wrote to Jack Rosenthal, the editor of The Times Magazine: “You are correct that I did give an interview to John Jenkins for the article which appeared in your magazine in 1985; it may have been in part the impression that article made on me that led me to decide not to grant any such interviews in the future."

Jenkins wrote only occasionally for magazines after the 1980s, and mostly then for his friend Michael VerMeulen, who was editor of the British edition of GQ. Jenkins preferred to concentrate on book writing and publishing. His recent book, "The Partisan: The Life of William Rehnquist" (PublicAffairs, 2012), is an Editor's Choice of the New York Times Book Review. Jenkins is the author of two other popular books about lawyers, The Litigators: Inside the Powerful World of America's High-Stakes Trial Lawyers (Doubleday, 1989), and Ladies’ Man: The Life and Trials of Marvin Mitchelson (St. Martin's, 1992).

Jenkins is a member of the Authors Guild, PEN American Center, the executive council of the Association of American Publishers’ Professional and Scholarly Division, and is active in civic, professional and charitable affairs as a board member. He is the founder of the Broadway Bound Fund, which provides acting classes to youngsters through the Armory Foundation of New York City; the chairman of the American Publishers Awards for Professional and Scholarly Excellence, also known as the PROSE Awards ; a member of the Board of Visitors of the Philip Merrill College of Journalism at the University of Maryland, College Park; and a member of the Board of Directors of OpenSecrets in Washington, D.C. He served on the Federal Advisory Committee of the Commerce Department’s National Technical Information Service, the board of directors of the Friends of the Law Library of Congress, and the board of directors of the Software and Information Industry Association. He is also a co-founder of PoliScio Analytics, a Washington, D.C.-based data analytics and journalism company.

A 1972 graduate of the Philip Merrill College of Journalism at the University of Maryland, College Park, he lives with his wife and children in New York City and Washington, D.C., where he remains active in city affairs following nine years of service as an elected advisory neighborhood commissioner.
