= Kaplan Fox =

- Headquarters: New York City
- No. of offices: 4
- No. of attorneys: 39
- No. of employees: 45
- Major practice areas: Class action lawsuits, complex litigation, securities
- Date founded: 1955
- Website: www.kaplanfox.com

Kaplan Fox, also known as Kaplan Fox & Kilsheimer, is an American plaintiffs' law firm. Founded in 1955, the firm employees 39 lawyers in offices in New York, San Francisco, Los Angeles, Chicago, and New Jersey.

== Cases ==
In 2014, The New York Times wrote that Kaplan Fox was part of "a flourishing industry that pairs plaintiffs' lawyers with state attorneys general to sue companies, a collaboration that has set off a furious competition between trial lawyers and corporate lobbyists to influence these officials." The firm has been a major donor to state attorneys general associations, candidates, state party committees, and attorneys general running for governor.

In 2020, Kaplan Fox brought class action litigation against financial trading platform Robinhood Markets. Along with another law firm, Kaplan Fox spearheaded coordination among the plaintiffs' firms that filed various class action lawsuits, urging the firms to consolidate in federal court. They asked U.S. District Judge James Donato to appoint them interim counsel and to name an executive committee of nine attorneys from different plaintiffs' law firms. Donato rejected the proposed leadership structure due to its lack of diversity, citing the fact that all of the proposed representatives were men. Donato also said the proposed list included many lawyers and law firms that are frequently involved in class actions and multidistrict litigation (MDL), and "that experience might benefit the prospective class, but highlights the 'repeat player' problem in class counsel appointments that has burdened class action litigation and MDL proceedings."

In July 2021, Kaplan Fox filed a consumer class action lawsuit against Honda, alleging some of their cars have defective batteries.

Kaplan Fox represented a class of litigants who sued Apple Inc. over iPhone battery life, obtaining a $310 million settlement. The class action lawyers in the case received an $81 million fee award. In an amicus brief filed in the 9th Circuit Court of Appeals, attorneys general for 13 states challenged the lawyers' fees. The attorneys general said that class counsel from Kaplan Fox and Cotchett, Pitre & McCarthy deserved no more than their lodestar billing of $36 million. The fee award was also challenged by some members of the class action lawsuit, who argued that the 26% award was excessive. The United States Department of Justice urged "the judge to remember that every dollar awarded to class counsel is a dollar that consumers will not receive." Class members were expected to receive $25 for each iPhone owned.
