= Law and the Multiverse =

Law blog

- Website type: Blog
- Creators: James Daily; Ryan Davidson
- Website: lawandthemultiverse.com
- Commercial: Yes
- Launched: November 2010
- Current status: Active

Law and the Multiverse is a law blog created by attorneys James Daily and Ryan Davidson. The blog takes a tongue-in-cheek look at the world of comic books and analyses the real-world legal implications of the events portrayed therein. The blog focuses primarily on common tropes from the DC and Marvel universes, but occasionally looks at more specific topics, such as the Keene Act from the Watchmen series.

== Format ==
Each post is primarily written by either Mr. Daily or Mr. Davidson and occasionally includes commentary from the other author. The posts are written in a traditional dry style in order to mimic the feeling of law journals and serious legal blogs. The authors state that their purpose is to simultaneously address situations humorously familiar to comic book fans and interesting legal situations with the goal of entertaining their readership while educating their fans about the process of law and legal thought.

== Recognition ==
Law and the Multiverse has been featured in print publications such as the New York Times and The Journal Gazette as well as on popular websites such as The Volokh Conspiracy, Boing Boing and Slashdot. As of December 2010 the site receives over 20,000 visits per day.
