= Mauritiana =

Scientific classification
- Kingdom: Fungi
- Division: Ascomycota
- Class: Dothideomycetes
- Order: Pleosporales
- Family: Halotthiaceae
- Genus: Mauritiana; Poonyth, K.D. Hyde, Aptroot & Peerally

Genus of fungi

Mauritiana is a genus of lichenized fungi in the family Halotthiaceae.
