= List of Emory University School of Law alumni =

This is a list of notable alumni of Emory University School of Law, the law school of the American Emory University, located in Atlanta, Georgia. (For a list of notable Emory University people, see the List of Emory University people.)

== Notable alumni ==
=== Business and private practice ===
- John Chidsey, current CEO of Subway (restaurant), former executive chairman and CEO of the Burger King Corporation
- John Dowd, President Trump's personal attorney (and leader of his legal team); investigator and author of the Dowd Report, which detailed betting on baseball games by Pete Rose in the 1980s; represented Senator John McCain (R-AZ) during the Senate ethics investigation known as the Keating Five in the hearings held in 1990 and 1991
- C. Robert Henrikson, former chairman, president, and CEO of MetLife
- Boisfeuillet Jones, Sr., Atlanta philanthropist
- Jim Lanzone, president and CEO of CBS Interactive; chief digital officer of CBS Corporation
- Raymond W. McDaniel Jr., president and chief executive officer of Moody's Corporation

=== Government and politics ===
- David I. Adelman, former United States Ambassador to Singapore
- Luis A. Aguilar, commissioner at the U.S. Securities and Exchange Commission (LL.M.; J.D. University of Georgia School of Law)
- Thurbert Baker, attorney general of Georgia, 1997–2011
- Sanford Bishop, current U.S. representative for Georgia's 2nd congressional district
- Benjamin B. Blackburn, former U.S. representative for Georgia's 4th congressional district
- James V. Carmichael, former member of the Georgia General Assembly, former president of Scripto pen company, candidate for governor of Georgia in 1946
- John James Flynt, Jr., former U.S. representative from Georgia (attended but did not graduate)
- Tillie K. Fowler, former U.S. representative for the 4th District of Florida
- Wyche Fowler, former president of the Atlanta City Council, former United States congressman for 5th Congressional District of Georgia, former United States senator for Georgia, former United States ambassador to Saudi Arabia
- Gordon Giffin, former United States ambassador to Canada
- Carte Goodwin, former United States senator of West Virginia
- Ben F. Johnson, former member of the Georgia State Senate and dean of the Emory University School of Law and the Georgia State University College of Law
- Robb LaKritz, former advisor to the deputy U.S. Treasury secretary, appointed by President George W. Bush
- Elliott H. Levitas, former U.S. representative from Georgia
- Christian Miele, member of the Maryland House of Delegates
- Joe Negron, elected to replace Mark Foley as the Republican candidate in the 16th District of Florida in the 2006 election
- Sam Nunn, former United States senator from Georgia 1972–1997; businessman
- Sam Olens, attorney general of Georgia, 2011–2016; formerly president of Kennesaw State University
- Randolph W. Thrower, former U.S. commissioner of Internal Revenue
- Teresa Tomlinson, current mayor of Columbus, Georgia
- Fani Willis, district attorney of Fulton County, Georgia

=== Judiciary ===
- Anthony Alaimo, judge of the United States District Court for the Southern District of Georgia
- Marvin S. Arrington, Sr., former Fulton County Superior Court judge and author of Making My Mark: The Story of a Man Who Wouldn’t Stay in His Place, GA's 45th "Book of the Year"
- Rowland Barnes, former Fulton County Superior Court judge murdered in his courtroom
- Stanley F. Birch, Jr., judge of the United States Court of Appeals for the Eleventh Circuit
- Elizabeth L. Branch, judge on the United States Court of Appeals for the Eleventh Circuit
- Fred P. Branson, associate justice of the Oklahoma Supreme Court, served as chief justice 1927–1929
- Ada E. Brown, judge of the United States District Court for the Northern District of Texas, former appellate justice on the Fifth Court of Appeals of Texas
- Mark Howard Cohen, judge on the United States District Court for the Northern District of Georgia
- Clarence Cooper, judge of the United States District Court for the Northern District of Georgia
- Kristi DuBose, chief judge of the United States District Court for the Southern District of Alabama
- J. Robert Elliott, judge of the United States District Court for the Middle District of Georgia
- Orinda D. Evans, former chief district judge of the United States District Court for the Northern District of Georgia
- J. Owen Forrester, judge of the United States District Court for the Northern District of Georgia
- Richard Cameron Freeman, judge of the United States District Court for the Northern District of Georgia
- Leo M. Gordon, judge of the United States Court of International Trade
- Steven Grimberg, judge of the United States District Court for the North District of Georgia
- Glenda Hatchett, former chief judge of Fulton County Juvenile Court, and star of the television show Judge Hatchett
- Catharina Haynes, judge on the United States Court of Appeals for the Fifth Circuit
- Lynn Carlton Higby, judge of the United States District Court for the Northern District of Florida
- James Clinkscales Hill, judge of the United States Court of Appeals for the Fifth Circuit and the United States Court of Appeals for the Eleventh Circuit
- Frank M. Hull, judge on the United States Court of Appeals for the Eleventh Circuit
- Willis B. Hunt Jr., judge of the United States District Court for the Northern District of Georgia
- Hugh Lawson, judge of the United States District Court for the Middle District of Georgia
- Charles Allen Moye Jr., judge of the United States District Court for the Northern District of Georgia
- R. Kenton Musgrave, judge of the United States Court of International Trade
- William Clark O'Kelley, judge of the United States District Court for the Northern District of Georgia
- John Andrew Ross, judge of the United States District Court for the Eastern District of Missouri
- Leah Ward Sears, former chief justice of the Supreme Court of Georgia
- George Ernest Tidwell, judge of the United States District Court for the Northern District of Georgia
- Robert H. Whaley, judge of the United States District Court for the Eastern District of Washington

=== Other ===
- W. Watts Biggers, co-creator of the animated TV series Underdog
- Glenda Hatchett, former chief judge of Fulton County Juvenile Court, and star of the television show Judge Hatchett
- Bobby Jones, former amateur golfer, founder and designer of the Augusta National Golf Club
- Shivana Jorawar, reproductive justice advocate and community organizer
- Bernice King, minister, daughter of Coretta and Martin Luther King Jr.
- Larry Klayman, founder and former chairman of Judicial Watch
- Josh Luber, co-founder of luxury resale website StockX
- Robert Shemin, real estate investor and author
- Bob Varsha, on-air personality for Speed
