= Parallel economy (United States) =

Economic and social architecture

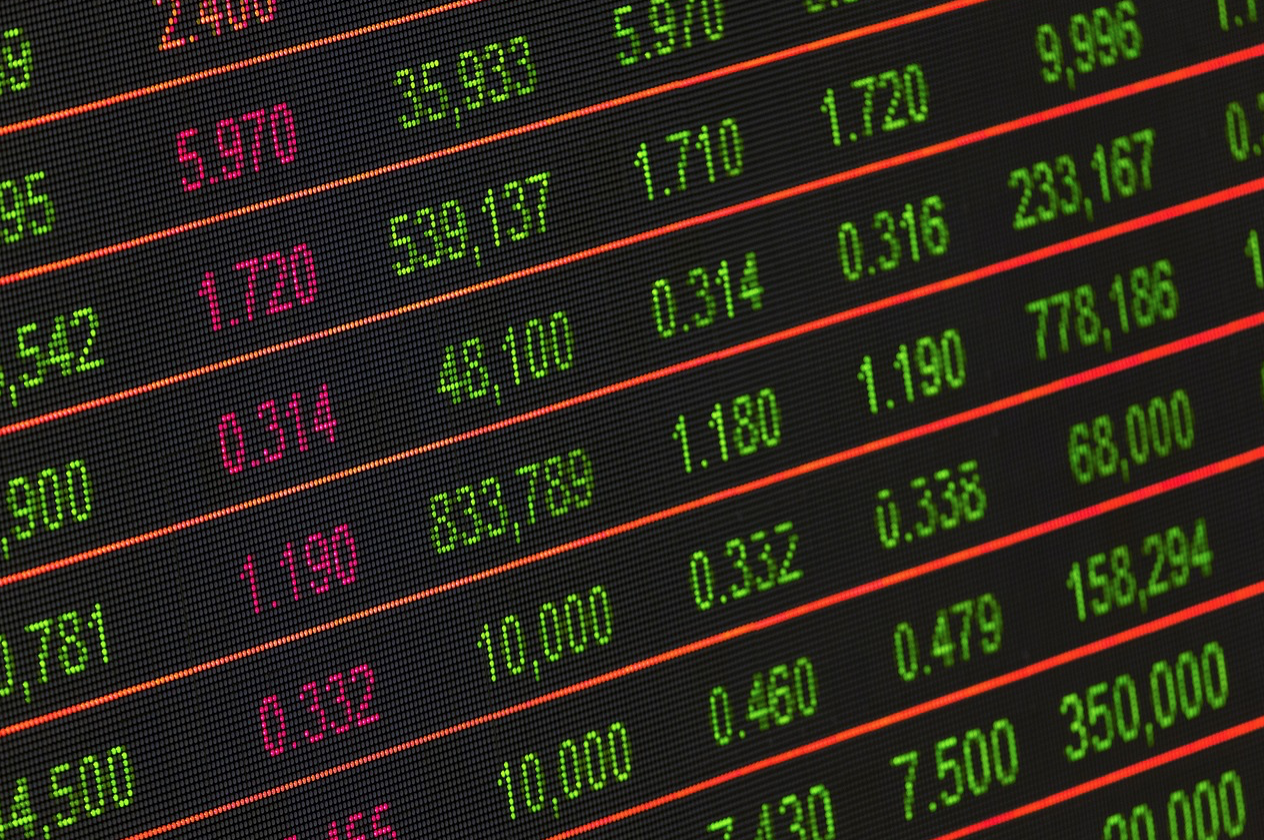
US stock market numbers

The Parallel economy, also known as the patriot economy or anti-woke economy is a developing ecosystem of businesses, digital platforms, consumer goods, and investment vehicles created to operate outside mainstream corporate America. First appearing in the 1980s, the parallel economy has taken hold in more recent years as companies from multiple industries have battled for consumer spending and attention. Its growth has been driven by the perception that major corporations and institutions have aligned closely with progressive causes or shut conservatives out of the marketplace. A prominent example is environmental, social, and governance (ESG) policies. 18 Republican-led states have banned or restricted state investment in ESG aligned companies and funds. Proponents of the parallel economy seek to establish commercial infrastructure that is free of deplatforming, debanking, or cancelling. In response to corporate alignment around activist causes post-2020 the parallel economy has emerged as a counter-movement in multiple forms including alternative payment rails, independent schooling networks, and ideologically branded goods.

== Origins ==
The beginnings of the parallel economy have their beginnings in the 1980s that featured Christian pressure campaigns on corporations, the repealing of the Fairness Doctrine and the subsequent growth of conservative media. Alternative infrastructure emerged in multiple areas including media and education with the rise of a conservative push into homeschooling. Donald Wildmon founded the National Federation for Decency in 1977, (eventually renamed the American Family Association) to pushback against "salacious" content on television. Some of the most notable campaigns include fights against major broadcasting networks and 7-Eleven. Wildmon claimed to have successfully forced the removal of hundreds of ads and 7-Eleven pulled their pornographic magazines after legal and boycott pressure.

Meanwhile, homeschooling in the United States around the same time underwent a conservative take over and explosion. Attorney Michael Farris founded the Home School Legal Defense Association and pushed conservatives to pull their kids out of government schools. For an annual $100 Harris promised legal representation to parents who came under legal challenge for their homeschooling. By the late 1980s evangelicals represented over 90% of the homeschooled population. Evangelical infrastructure of schools and churches as well as the preponderance of mother's staying home made for a natural parallel infrastructure. In 1985, 50,000 kids were homeschooled by 2001 that number was estimated to be as high as 1.9 million.

In 1987 Ronald Reagan's Federal Communications Commission (FCC) repealed the Fairness Doctrine, which was regulatory guidance requiring different viewpoints to be represented equally on broadcast airwaves. The repealing of the doctrine gave space for conservative radio hosts such as Rush Limbaugh and Sean Hannity. These individuals and subsequent figures represented a growth in exclusive conservative media that had not previously existed.

== Contemporary movement ==
In the 2010s and 2020s, the parallel economy represents a multi-faceted reaction to what's perceived as antagonizing and exclusion of conservatives. There has been a large growth in conservative focused alternative companies such as Black Rifle Coffee Company, The Daily Wire, Rumble, and America First Healthcare among others. Recent years have been marked by a noticeable change as corporations that once stayed away from politics lean into them. The rise of stakeholder advocacy has caused corporations of all stripes to take stances where they may have previously stayed away. For example, there were $50 billion in pledges towards a variety of organizations and causes post May-2020 in the wake of the murder of George Floyd. This cascaded into funding for Environmental Social Governance, Diversity, Equity, & Inclusion and LBGT-rights causes. This led to conservative boycotts by media personalities like Robby Starbuck in his boycott campaign against Target. In the absence of boycotts or due to their mixed effectiveness conservatives have launched an array of products to give sympathetic audiences a perceived alternative.

== Media ==
In media, Rush Limbaugh set the precedent for right-wing conservative radio and in recent years that has broadened into video entertainment and social media. In 2009, Dennis Prager and Allen Estrin founded PragerU. A media platform designed for undermining alleged left-wing bias in universities. In 2019, PragerU boasted 130,000 online donors and Zionist patrons such as Miriam Adelson and Farris Wilks. In 2013, Chris Pavlovski founded Rumble as an independent alternative to YouTube. The platform grew in the wakes of deplatforming surrounding COVID-19 conspiracies and the January 6 Capitol attack. The platform has hosted wide variety of content creators including far-right media personality Nick Fuentes.

That same year, Angel Studios was founded in Provo, Utah by Neal, Jeffrey and Jordan Harmon. Launched as a Christian-themed alternative, they've experienced increased notoriety through series like The Chosen and a film about child-trafficking, Sound of Freedom. Angel Studios operates off equity-based crowdfunding and boasts over 1.5 million members in 180 countries.

In 2015, Farris Wilks and Ben Shapiro founded The Daily Wire. The Daily Wire served as a conservative alternative for political commentary and later branched out into movies and kids entertainment. In 2020, Parler was an app founded as a conservative alternative to Twitter. Parler rose to the #1 app on the Apple store in the days following January 6. It was subsequently removed from the Amazon Web Services, the Apple and Google Play stores effectively taking it offline. In the wake of Trump's social media ban after the January 6th riots and the shuttering of Parler Trump Media & Technology Group founded Truth Social as a twitter alternative specially catered to Trump. Truth Social currently headed by Kevin McGurn serves as Trump's first and primary form of media. Despite this fact, it has experienced trouble gaining traction with a wider public audience.

== Finance ==
The financial realm of the parallel economy has primarily focused on driving other conservative alternatives in areas such as media and consumer goods. Some of these companies include firms such as Narya Capital, 1789 Capital, and Strive Asset Management.

In 2020, Narya Capital was founded by now Vice President JD Vance Vance and Colin Greenspon, a firm focused on the rust-belt and reindustrialization of America. Vance and Greenspon raised more than $93 million from Peter Thiel and Google's Eric Schmidt among others. Narya Capital focuses on early stage venture investing and is less than $200 million in size. However, the firm gave J.D. Vance his positioning as a "heartland" investor despite mixed success. Narya most notably was an early investor in Pavloski's Rumble.

1789 Capital founded in 2022, by Omeed Malik and two co-founders. It had $3.5 billion assets under management in 2026 and positions itself as an anti-ESG firm. Donald Trump Jr. also serves as a venture partner of the firm. Most of the $3.5 billion has come since Donald Trump Jr. joined the firm and large portion of it from foreign investors. Prompting Democrats in the House of Representatives to launch an investigation on the firm's steep rise. They have made notable investments such as a $15 million seed investment in the Tucker Carlson Network.

Strive Asset management was founded in 2022 by Vivek Ramaswamy. They received early funding from Peter Thiel and Bill Ackman among others and had a billion assets under management. This is compared to $449 billion in ESG tied funds in 2023. Strive through its index funds gains control of proxy votes to push for right-wing policy in corporate board rooms.

== Politics ==
In the political arena, the Trump administration and republican-led state governments have enacted legislation against deplatforming and ESG investment. While actions in the political arena haven't directly led to alternatives, it has served to remove conservative money from mainstream finance. In 2023, Republican lawmakers in 37 states introduced 165 pieces of legislation to restrict investment in Environmental Social Governance and related initiatives. In 2025, 18 states had laws restricting ESG investment. The laws on the books vary in scope and size. For example, in Florida, Georgia and Kansas among others their laws bar state and retirement funds for being used in furthering ideological or social interest. While other states such as Idaho and Texas specifically mention that government funds cannot be used to discriminate against the fossil-fuel industry. For example, state treasurers in West Virginia, Florida, Texas and other states along with state agencies divested their funds from Blackrock in response to their support for climate-change initiatives. The funds were either managed internally or spread out to asset managers in compliance with state law.

== Education ==
In education alternative curriculums for school districts, homeschool networks and online platforms have served as the main driver for those looking for different education options. For decades on the university colleges such as Liberty University, Pensacola Christian College, and Hillsdale College have offered Christian and conservative-leaning alternatives for families sending their kids to college.

Hillsdale college serves a unique example due to its refusal to accept federal finance aid, exempting it from numerous federal regulations. In 2022, Tennessee governor Bill Lee invited Hillsdale to the state to establish 50 publicly funded charters to develop "informed patriotism". Overall, Hillsdale has established 21 charters in 10 states. 30 schools of public and private charter have partnered with Hillsdale to use their curriculum.

State initiatives such as school choice programs have given parents the option to opt-out of state run education and often with state funds. Education savings accounts enacted by states like Arizona and Texas allow states to allocate money to children based off average spending per child and the child's type of enrollment whether that is private school or homeschooling. Meanwhile, voucher programs in places like West Virginia and Ohio give offer vouchers as one of the many options and 31 states have opted into the federal Education Freedom Scholarship Program that grants families a $1,700 tax credit to organizations that grant scholarships for school choice efforts.

In the wake of school closures during the pandemic, many parents found alternatives to their local public schools. One of those alternatives has been microschools where for example, 100 students are broken up across several rooms of 10-15 students to experience a more personalized learning environment. The Rand Corporation has reported that 1-2 million kids are in microschools full-time with many more attending on a part time basis. In the same realm homeschooling overall, has rapidly grown as mainstream alternative for parents looking to different options. 3.4% of kids in the United States are homeschooled along with another 1.8% were in virtual schools. Of those parents homeschooling their kids 83% had concerns about the school environment and 75% said they wanted to provide moral instruction. Over 50% also cited the importance of religious instruction for their reasoning. In the 2024–2025 school year homeschooling grew by double digits in double with South Carolina reporting 21.5% growth from the previous year.

== Consumer products ==
Reactionary consumers have sought to find ideologically aligned brands in the wake of corporations taking more public stances on political and social issues. Companies at the forefront of this alignment and acting as aggregators for ideologically aligned brands include Mammoth nation and Public Square. Public Square brands itself as an online marketplace for “pro-life, pro-family, [and] pro-freedom” brands. Since its launch the marketplace's value has come just short of collapse falling 99% and it faces delisting on the New York Stock Exchange.

Individually, companies such as The Daily Wire have come out with their own multivitamins and razors as alternative to more "woke" brands. Army Ranger Mat Best founded Black Rifle Coffee (BRCC) to provide an explicitly patriotic alternative for coffee drinkers. In the second quarter of 2026 BRCC reported $107 million in revenue beating Wall Street expectations. BRCC led competitors such as Starbucks, Bustelo, and Forbes in growth over a 52-week period.

While not explicitly a consumer good, GiveSendGo has functioned as right-wing version of GoFundMe for grassroots fundraising and causes. In 2020, fundraisers on GoFundMe for Kyle Rittenhouse were removed after he was charged with first-degre e homicide and other offenses after shooting three people during riots in Kenosha, Wisconsin. GoFundMe cited their policy of not platforming legal defenses of violent crime. He was restored to the platform after his acquittal in November 2021. In the interim Rittenhouse raised over $500,000 on GiveSendGo for his legal defense. In 2022, the Canadian Freedom Convoy protests attempted to use GoFundMe to raise efforts for their cause. After raising $8 million U.S. dollars GoFundme shuttered the fundraisers and after legal threats promised to refund donors. After moving to GiveSendGo convoy organizers raised a similar amount in a matter of days. Despite a court order to freeze the funds, GiveSendGo unsuccessfully attempted to distribute the funds anyway. The site has been a source of controversy for hosting a variety of right-wing campaigns and causes.

Another notable player is Patriot Mobile. Patriot Mobile is a wireless carrier that markets itself as “America’s only Christian conservative wireless provider.” They also pledge part of the phone bill customers pay to conservative causes. In 2021, Patriot Mobile pledged $1.5 million to conservative causes, tripling its amount from the previous year. In 2022, Patriot Mobile orchestrated the conservative takeover of four Texas school boards.
