= Omeed Malik =

American business executive and banker (born 1979 or 1980)

- Born: 1979 or 1980 (age 46–47); New Jersey, U.S.
- Education: Colgate University (BA); Emory University (JD)
- Occupations: Business executive and banker

Omeed Malik (born 1979 or 1980) is an American banker and business executive. He is the founder and CEO of the merchant bank Farvahar Partners, and co-founder of conservative venture capital firm 1789 Capital, which U.S. president Donald Trump's eldest son, Donald Trump Jr., joined in 2024.

Malik exited from Bank of America Merrill Lynch, where he was a prime brokerage executive, in 2018 and subsequently filed a defamation claim against Bank of America that the company settled later that year.

== Early life and family ==
The son of an Iranian mother and a Pakistani father, Omeed Malik was born in New Jersey in 1979 or 1980. He lived in New York until 2020, when he and his family moved to Florida.

Malik received his Juris Doctor degree from Emory University Law School and his bachelor's degree from Colgate University. In 1999, he was a spokesperson for U.S. representative Donald M. Payne, a Democrat of New Jersey.

== Career ==
=== Brokerage industry and 2018 defamation claim ===
Malik worked as a corporate lawyer at Weil, Gotshal & Manges in New York before joining MF Global and later Bank of America Merrill Lynch to run the prime brokerage business and to lead the emerging manager program.

Malik left Bank of America in January 2018 to launch an advisory firm for hedge funds and alternative investment managers. Later reports indicated that Malik was forced out after investigations into allegations of inappropriate conduct, including unwanted advances toward women he worked with, which Malik disputed and filed a $100 million arbitration claim against Bank of America on the basis of defamation, retaliation, breach of contract, and discrimination against his Muslim background. In July 2018, Bank of America settled the case and paid Malik an eight-figure sum.

Malik appeared on the Showtime television series Billions in a 2018 cameo role. In 2019, The Wall Street Journal reported that Malik used Status Labs to reduce the visibility of content related to his dispute with Bank of America.

=== Farvahar Partners and 1789 Capital (2019–2024) ===
Malik founded the New York–based merchant bank Farvahar Partners with a former colleague at Bank of America, Joe Voboril, in 2019. In 2020, Neil Patel brought in Malik as a new partner of right-wing news site The Daily Caller. In 2021, it was reported that Malik would become chairman and CEO of a special-purpose acquisition company (SPAC) named Colombier Acquisition Corp.

Malik, Rebekah Mercer, and Chris Buskirk founded 1789 Capital, a venture capital firm which focuses on products and companies associated with conservative values, the following year. In 2023, it made its first investment into the new media company led by Tucker Carlson and Neil Patel. In 2023, Malik's Colombier Acquisition Corp. II, another SPAC, agreed to merge with online marketplace Public Square.

=== 2024 presidential election and second Trump administration (2024–present) ===
Malik was an early supporter of the Robert F. Kennedy Jr. presidential campaign leading up to the 2024 U.S. elections, and later a supporter of Donald Trump presidential campaign. After Trump's conviction in New York, Malik said: "This verdict will have less than zero impact on my support". Following Trump's victory in the presidential election, Trump's eldest son Donald Trump Jr. announced that he would be joining Malik's 1789 Capital as opposed to a role in his father's administration.

In 2025, Malik was appointed to Fannie Mae's board of directors by Bill Pulte, director of the Federal Housing Finance Agency. Also that year, Malik's Colombier Acquisition Corp. II announced it would merge with GrabAGun, an online retailer of firearms, ammunition, and gun accessories, with Trump Jr. to participate as a shareholder and advisor; the gun retailer began trading on the New York Stock Exchange later in the year. Pulte's private investment firm, The Pulte Family Office, also was an investor in Malik's GrabAGun venture. Shortly after he joined Fannie Mae's board, Malik and partners at 1789 Capital also opened the Executive Branch, a Trump-aligned club in Washington, D.C.

A SPAC backed by Malik, Chamath Palihapitiya, and Trump Jr., Colombier Acquisition Corp. III, filed for a $260 million initial public offering later in the year.

== Political views ==
According to Malik, he used to be a "run-of-the-mill Democrat" until the COVID-19 pandemic, when he became a Republican. New York magazine noted that according to public records, Malik donated to Democrats until July 2019, when he switched to only donate to Republicans like Donald Trump.

== See also ==
- Conservatism in the United States
- Scott Bessent
- Blake Masters
- Larry Fink
- List of Emory University School of Law alumni
- List of people from New Jersey
- Vivek Ramaswamy
