= Palmer Report =

American political blog

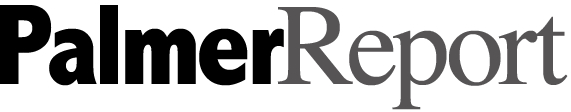

- Homepage on July 4, 2021
- Website type: Fake news; Liberalism; Conspiracy theories
- Available in: English
- Predecessor: Daily News Bin
- Owner: Bill Palmer
- Founder: Bill Palmer
- Website: www.palmerreport.com
- Registration: None
- Launched: 2016; 10 years ago
- Current status: Active

The Palmer Report is an American liberal conspiracy theory and fake news website, founded in 2016 by Bill Palmer.

The site is known for making unsubstantiated or false claims, producing hyperpartisan content, and publishing conspiracy theories, especially on matters relating to Donald Trump and Russia. Fact-checkers have debunked numerous Palmer Report stories, and organizations including the Columbia Journalism Review and the German Marshall Fund have listed the site among false content producers or biased websites.

== History ==
Bill Palmer worked as an elementary school teacher before beginning a series of online publications. His earlier endeavors primarily discussed music and technology. In 2013, he launched a publication titled The Stabley Times under a pseudonym. Like his previous websites, the site covered music and technology, but it also added coverage of political and sports-related topics. Palmer subsequently founded a politics-focused site called Daily News Bin. A hyperpartisan left-wing website, Daily News Bin was described by Snopes editor Brooke Binkowski as "a pro-Hillary Clinton 'news site' designed to 'counter misinformation'". Daily News Bin promoted fake and sensationalized pro-Clinton narratives, according to The New York Observer.

A 2017 study by the Berkman Klein Center for Internet & Society at Harvard University identified Daily News Bin as part of a set of "newer highly partisan sites farther left on the spectrum" than "the mainstays of liberal media" such as the Huffington Post, Vox, and Slate. Also in 2017, Aaron Blake wrote in the Washington Post that misinformation from the Daily News Bin was comparable to that of InfoWars or The Gateway Pundit during the 2016 United States presidential election. Daily News Bin published falsehoods on Bernie Sanders and voting machines in Wisconsin. Additionally, Daily News Bin falsely claimed that the Podesta emails were fabricated and falsely claimed that a video of a public event funded by Goldman Sachs was one of Clinton's paid speeches to Goldman Sachs. Daily News Bin was included in Le Monde's database of unreliable news sites.

== Content ==
The Palmer Report is a hyperpartisan liberal fake news political blog. It is known for making unsubstantiated or false claims and publishing conspiracy theories, especially on matters relating to Donald Trump and Russia. The Palmer Report typically uses anonymous Secret Service sources and its articles give the impression that Trump is about to go to prison or be deposed. It is regarded as a political propaganda outlet or left-wing disinformation. Articles from the Palmer Report were shared almost exclusively by Hillary Clinton supporters during the 2016 presidential election. The Palmer Report received five million unique visits per month over the course of 2017.

Some of the Palmer Report's most widely shared stories include the conspiracy theory that then-House Speaker Paul Ryan and Sen. Majority Leader Mitch McConnell funneled "Russian money" to Trump and that Robert Mueller planned on arresting Donald Trump Jr. for "treason."

=== 2016–2017 ===
After Trump was announced as the winner of the election, the Palmer Report published two articles claiming that the election was "rigged" and falsely claimed 5,000 Trump votes in Wisconsin were disqualified. During a recount in Waukesha County, a story from the Palmer Report spread online, alleging that election officials were double-counting votes for Trump. The source of the story was an unverified Facebook post. Election officials dismissed the story, and the Wisconsin Elections Commission found no evidence for the allegations. The story was shared close to 40,000 times on social media. Statistician Andrew Gelman compared the Palmer Report's claims of election rigging to claims made in the National Enquirer, and wrote that "the basis for these accusations is more perceived unfairness than actual statistics".

In January 2017, the Palmer Report claimed that Trump posed for a fake speechwriting photograph at an auction house receptionist's desk and included an Instagram photo of the receptionist. Snopes found that the photo in question had been taken at Mar-a-Lago and posted in December 2015 and that the receptionist was not an auction house employee.

During the 2017 Syria missile strikes ordered by Trump, the Palmer Report suggested, without evidence, that Trump spared the runways of the Shayrat airfield due to Russian collusion. MSNBC host Lawrence O'Donnell echoed a Palmer Report conspiracy theory that Syria's chemical weapon attack was orchestrated by the Russian government in order to allow Trump to appear distant from Putin. The story contained no evidence.

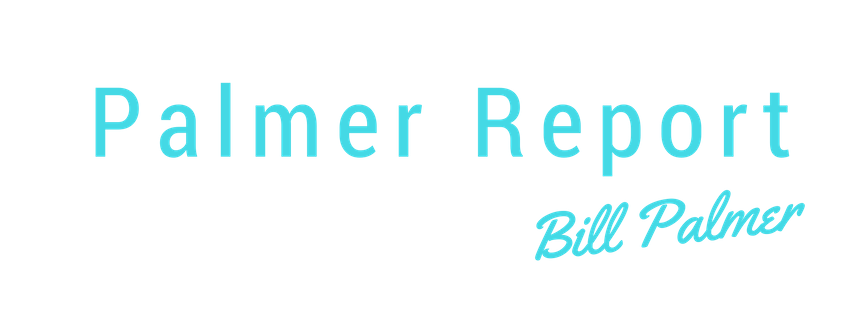
Previous Palmer Report logo

In April 2017, the Palmer Report falsely claimed that the FBI had intelligence that Russia was blackmailing Republican Representative Jason Chaffetz. The evidence for the claim came from a tweet from Louise Mensch, who, in turn, cited unnamed sources. Snopes found no evidence for this claim. Ned Price, former special assistant to Obama, promoted the false claim on Twitter.

The Palmer Report also wrote a story claiming that Trump paid $10 million to Chaffetz, which was later shared by constitutional law professor Laurence Tribe. The article pointed to a "report" from a tweet sent by a user with 257 followers. In response to Tribe sharing the Palmer Report's article, political scientist Brendan Nyhan wrote: "Is this a joke? This is tinfoil hat conspiracy stuff". A few years later, Tribe acknowledged he made "a mistake" and did not realize the Palmer Report "was as unreliable as it is."

In May 2017, Senator Ed Markey was forced to backtrack a false claim that a grand jury had been impaneled in New York in relation to the Special Counsel investigation; the source for the claim was the Palmer Report and Mensch's blog, according to one of his aides. In the same month, the Palmer Report reported that Supreme Court Chief Justice John Roberts had ordered Neil Gorsuch to recuse himself from all Trump-related Russia hearings, with his only source being a "single tweet from an anonymous Twitter account under the name 'Puesto Loco'".

During the 2017 Niger ambush, where four US soldiers were killed by militants from the Islamic State in the Greater Sahara, the Palmer Report speculated that US troops in Niger were involved in a "secret Russian-controlled military operation" approved by Trump. The Palmer Report also pushed a conspiracy theory that the Trump administration's travel ban against Chad was connected to the Niger ambush.

In October 2017, the Palmer Report published a story claiming that Jared Kushner had "secretly" flown to Saudi Arabia "ahead of his possible arrest", citing a Politico article. The cited Politico article debunks the Palmer Report's own story since it stated that Kushner had actually departed on a diplomatic trip two days prior to the announcement that Robert Mueller's team would begin issuing indictments in relation to the Special Counsel investigation and that Kushner returned to Washington, D.C. to celebrate his wife Ivanka Trump's birthday before anyone had been taken into custody. Snopes rated the Palmer Report's story as false. A few days after the story was published, Palmer acknowledged that Kushner returned home and was not arrested.

=== 2018–present ===
During the 2018 Kavanaugh hearings, the Palmer Report and others falsely claimed that attorney Zina Bash, who is of Mexican and Jewish descent, flashed a "white-power" symbol. Journalist David Harsanyi said the Palmer Report and others were "conspiracy-mongering in much the same way Alex Jones is conspiracy-mongering".

Following a speech Trump delivered on January 8, 2020, concerning an Iranian missile strike at American bases and other hostilities with Iran, the Palmer Report incorrectly claimed that a general standing behind Trump gave a "horrified look" when Trump mentioned hypersonic missiles. The Palmer Report also incorrectly claimed that by acknowledging the missiles, Trump leaked "classified information". A video of the speech shows no general giving a horrified look and it is a well known fact that America possess hypersonic missile technology.

In August 2020, the Palmer Report "[led] the charge" against MSNBC host Chris Hayes after he reported on the Tara Reade sexual assault accusations against Biden. The Palmer Report commented, "I won't stop going after Hayes until he retracts his false story or he's off the air." According to The Daily Dot, "All Hayes did was address the story. But Biden supporters ... are throwing their arms up at a member of the media for covering it, demanding he be fired, calling it fake news, and searching for conspiracies, refusing to interrogate that a candidate who has a history of making women uncomfortable could do something like that."

In December 2020, the Palmer Report falsely reported that Colin Powell had urged Michael Flynn to be put on "military trial for sedition".

== Accuracy and ideology ==
In an October 2018 Simmons Research survey of 38 news organizations, the Palmer Report was ranked the fourth least trusted news organization by Americans – underneath Breitbart News and the Daily Kos – with Occupy Democrats, InfoWars, and The Daily Caller being lower-ranked. In an October 2020 study by the German Marshall Fund examining misinformation on social media during the 2016 election, the Palmer Report was one of the websites categorized as "false content producers" or "manipulators". The Palmer Report is labeled a biased source in the Columbia Journalism Review's collected index of "fake-news, clickbait, and hate sites".

=== Evaluation by journalists ===
Various journalists have publicly discouraged individuals from sharing Palmer Report articles. Bethania Palma, writing for Snopes, stated that the Palmer Report "generally relies on supposition, often extrapolating conclusions from flimsy sourcing, to make rather explosive claims that have fooled many". Snopes' managing editor, Brooke Binkowski, said that the stories were "nominally true" but sensationalized innocuous information. In 2017, Zack Beauchamp of Vox said that the Palmer Report was "devoted nearly exclusively to spreading bizarre assertions". Author Colin Dickey, writing in The New Republic, said that the Palmer Report "routinely blasts out stories that sound serious but are actually based on a single, unverified source". The Atlantic's McKay Coppins called the Palmer Report "the publication of record for anti-Trump conspiracy nuts who don't care about the credibility of the record". Journalist Glenn Greenwald of The Intercept wrote that the Palmer Report is "a classic fake news site created by ... a crazed fanatical follower of Hillary Clinton who got caught purposely disseminating fake news during the election". In 2017, George Zornick, writing for The Nation, described the Palmer Report as "churn[ing] out Russia-related fake news by the pixel load". The Washington Post columnist Dana Milbank identified the Palmer Report as "part of a larger phenomenon that has already taken root online, where in some quarters full-blown cases of Trump derangement syndrome have already broken out." David G. McAfee's The Curious Person's Guide to Fighting Fake News described the Palmer Report as a website that "provides skewed content featuring sensational headlines and stories with unverified conspiracy theories". In February 2017, The Atlantic ran an article titled "The Rise of Progressive Fake News" and used the Palmer Report as one of its leading examples.

Palmer Report's prediction that Susan Collins was "toast" in the 2020 United States Senate election in Maine – an election she won by nine points – was named one of "The Worst Predictions of 2020" by Politico.

In 2023, Newsweek issued a correction to a news story, writing in an editor's note that they had "incorrectly referred to Palmer Report as a fake news website".

=== Evaluation by academia ===
Political scientist Alan Wolfe wrote in 2019 that Trump's connection with Russia "has created a wide-open field for leftist conspiracy theorists to make one wild claim after another; nearly all of them ... can be conveniently found on a website called the Palmer Report." In a 2019 report from the NYU Stern Center for Business and Human Rights, the Palmer Report was described as a "left-leaning dubious-content site" where many of the articles "range from the unsubstantiated ... to the sophomoric." In Yochai Benkler's 2018 book, Network Propaganda, found that the Palmer Report (along with Occupy Democrats) were the "clearest examples" of left-wing sites that adopted the "hyperpartisan strategy" of successful right-wing sites in 2017. David Greenberg, a professor of history and journalism, identified the Palmer Report as a "junk-news" site and a source not to be trusted. Brendan Nyhan believes with sites like the Palmer Report, the left risks "poisoning" the Democratic Party. Sociologist Ellis Jones gave the Palmer Report an "F" grade on his "A" through "F" scale.

== Operation ==
The Palmer Report is operated by Bill Palmer, whom Business Insider described in 2017 as a "mysterious individual" whose history is largely unknown. The Palmer Report, like many of Palmer's previous publications, has a long list of writers on its website; in 2017 it was reported that many of them had only written a single article for the site, and most of the content appeared to have been written by Palmer himself. In 2023, while Palmer still writes many articles himself, there are five other regular writers. Palmer has used several GoFundMe campaigns to raise funds for his publication and the Palmer Report now features a prominent call for donations on each page. Palmer has clashed with other liberal social media groups, including Pantsuit Nation. Palmer describes himself as a political journalist; media sources have variously described him as a journalist, political analyst, left-wing political blogger, and anti-Trump Twitter user.
