= The Daily Caller =

American conservative news and opinion website

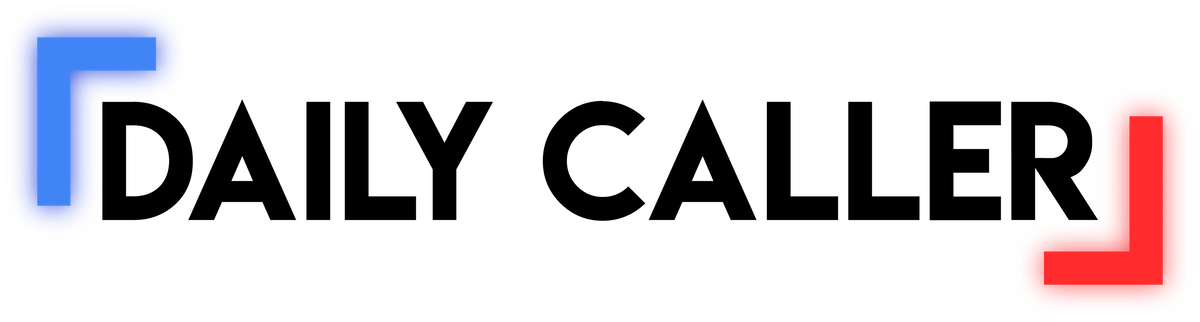
- Website type: News, opinion
- Available in: English
- Founded: January 11, 2010
- Headquarters: 1920 L Street NW, 2nd Floor Washington, D.C. 20036
- Owners: The Daily Caller, Inc.
- Founders: Tucker Carlson; Neil Patel
- Key people: Neil Patel (Publisher); Amber Duke (Editor-in-Chief); Eric Lieberman (Managing Editor)
- Website: dailycaller.com
- Advertising: Native
- Registration: Optional, required to comment
- Launched: January 11, 2010; 16 years ago
- Current status: Online

The Daily Caller is a conservative news and opinion website based in Washington, D.C. (Note: Sources describing The Daily Caller as right-wing:) (Note: Sources describing The Daily Caller as alt-right:) It was founded by political commentator Tucker Carlson and political advisor Neil Patel in 2010. Launched as a "conservative answer to The Huffington Post", The Daily Caller quadrupled its audience and became profitable by 2012, surpassing several rival websites by 2013. In 2020, the site was described by The New York Times as having been "a pioneer in online conservative journalism". As of 2025, The Daily Caller is a member of the White House press pool.

In 2020, Carlson left the site, with Patel buying out Carlson's stake to become majority owner. Foster Friess, a major conservative donor also known for being an investment manager, remained a partial owner until his death in 2021.

== History ==
The Daily Caller was founded by Tucker Carlson and Neil Patel. After raising $3 million in funding from businessman Foster Friess, the website was launched in January 2010. The organization began with a reporting staff of 21 in its Washington office. It was launched as a "conservative answer to The Huffington Post" or The New York Times, similarly featuring sections in broad range of subjects beyond politics. When The Daily Caller launched in 2010, it became the third Washington, D.C.–based news site besides Talking Points Memo and Politico. Breitbart became one of the site's main competitors.

In a 2010 interview with the Columbia Journalism Review, Carlson described The Daily Caller's prospective audience as "[p]eople who are distrustful of conventional news organizations". Carlson said "the coverage of the Tea Party blows me away by its stupidity. The assumption of almost everyone I know who covers politics for the networks or daily newspapers is: they're all birthers, they're all crazy, they're upset about fluoride in the water, probably racist. And those assumptions have prevented good journalism from taking place".

By late 2012, the site had quadrupled its page view and total audience and had become profitable without ever buying an advertisement for itself.

Vince Coglianese replaced Carlson as editor-in-chief in 2016 when the Tucker Carlson Tonight show began on Fox. Carlson departed the site in June 2020 to increase his focus on his new show. Patel brought in Omeed Malik as a new partner; a former hedge fund managing director and Muslim American Democrat, he was a donor to Donald Trump's 2016 presidential campaign. The Daily Caller became a minority-owned and -run company thereafter. Friess remained a partial owner until his death in 2021.

In 2020, The New York Times noted that "several former Daily Caller reporters occupy prominent roles in Washington journalism," specifically noting CNN White House correspondent Kaitlan Collins and Daily Mail reporter David Martosko.

== Political stances ==
When it first launched in January 2010, Mercedes Bunz, writing for The Guardian, said The Daily Caller was "setting itself up to be the conservative answer to The Huffington Post". According to Bunz, a year before the website launched, Carlson promoted it as "a new political website leaning more to the right than Politico and TalkingPointsMemo". However, at launch, he wrote a letter to readers that said it was not going to be a right-wing site. "We're not going to suck up to people in power, the way so many have", Carlson said. During a January 2010 interview with Politico, Carlson said The Daily Caller was not going to be tied to his personal political ideologies and that he wanted it to be "breaking stories of importance".

In a Washington Post article about The Daily Caller's launch, Howard Kurtz wrote, "[Carlson's] partner is Neil Patel, a former Dick Cheney aide. His opinion editor is Moira Bagley, who spent 2008 as the Republican National Committee's press secretary. And his $3 million in funding comes from Wyoming financier Foster Friess, a big-time GOP donor. But Carlson insists this won't be a right-wing site". Kurtz quoted Carlson as saying, "We're not enforcing any kind of ideological orthodoxy on anyone".

In an interview with The New York Times, Carlson said that the vast majority of traditional reporting comes from a liberal point of view and called The Daily Caller's reporting "the balance against the rest of the conventional press". In a 2012 Washingtonian article, Tom Bartlett said Carlson and Patel developed The Daily Caller as "a conservative news site in the mold of the liberal Huffington Post but with more firearms coverage and fewer nipple-slip slide shows".

In 2019, the Columbia Journalism Review described The Daily Caller as "right wing", a description also used by Business Insider, Snopes, and Harvard University's Berkman Klein Center for Internet & Society. The Guardian in April 2019 said The Daily Caller was known for pro-Trump content. A 2021 Politico article described The Daily Caller as "mainstream right", as opposed to more "conspiratorial fringe" outlets such as One America News Network. Other media outlets have referred to The Daily Caller as Conservative, including The Washington Post, The Wall Street Journal, and The New York Times.

=== Climate change ===
The Daily Caller has published articles that dispute the scientific consensus on climate change. According to Science magazine, The Daily Caller's "climate reporting focuses on doubt and highlights data that suggests climate concerns from the world's leading science agencies and organizations are incorrect". The accuracy of certain articles published in the early-to-mid 2010s was particularly questioned, as with a 2011 article claiming that the United States Environmental Protection Agency (EPA) was on a path towards spending $21 billion per year to hire 230,000 staff to regulate greenhouse gas emissions; at the time, the EPA had 17,000 staff and a total budget of $8.7 billion, while the numbers reported by The Daily Caller reflected the numbers that, according to Politifact and a legal brief filed in a related case, the agency in question would be obligated to hire "to regulate greenhouse gasses from all sources that emit them above the level set in statute". The story went viral in right-wing media, and was repeated by Republican politicians. Criticized articles on the subject later in the 2010s included the republication of a 2017 article published in Daily Mail which claimed that the National Oceanic and Atmospheric Administration (NOAA) manipulated data to make climate change appear worse; other news outlets debunked the Daily Mail story. A 2018 story cited an Obama administration memo pushing authors of an EPA National Climate Assessment report to include worst-case scenarios as evidence that the Obama administration intended those authors to focus on such scenarios. FactCheck.org disputed this story, stating that the memo "does not show that the Obama administration pushed for certain scenarios".

== Journalistic standards ==
Fact-checkers have frequently debunked Daily Caller stories. According to the 2018 book, Network Propaganda: Manipulation, Disinformation, and Radicalization in American Politics, written by Harvard University scholars Yochai Benkler, Robert Faris and Hal Roberts, The Daily Caller fails to follow journalistic norms in its reporting. According to the Encyclopædia Britannica, The Daily Caller "descended into extremism and sensationalism, publishing unsupported and frequently vulgar attacks on Democratic leaders, false criticisms of liberal causes, and popular conspiracy theories. The site also became known for its promotion of racist and sexist stereotypes".

Some scientific studies from 2019 identified The Daily Caller as a fake news website. In an October 2018 Simmons Research survey of 38 news organizations, The Daily Caller was ranked as the least trusted news organization by Americans, while others included BuzzFeed, The Daily Beast, Mother Jones, Breitbart News, the Daily Kos, the Palmer Report, Occupy Democrats and InfoWars.

In 2019, The Daily Caller, along with One America News Network and The Gateway Pundit, were categorized as unreliable sources of information by the Wikipedia community, with The Daily Caller entry on the Perennial sources list stating that it "publishes false or fabricated information".

=== Specific incidents ===
In 2011, The Daily Caller was the first news outlet to disseminate a Project Veritas video by conservative provocateur James O'Keefe which purportedly showed an NPR fundraiser deriding Republicans. The video was later proven to have been misleadingly edited. In February 2012, The Daily Caller conducted an "investigative series" of articles co-authored by Carlson, purporting to be an insiders' exposé of Media Matters for America (MMfA), a liberal watchdog group that monitors and scrutinizes conservative media outlets, and its founder David Brock. Citing "current and former" MMfA employees, "friends" of Brock's and a "prominent liberal", the article characterized MMfA as having "an atmosphere of tension and paranoia" and portrayed Brock as "erratic, unstable and disturbing", who "struggles with mental illness", in fear of "right-wing assassins", a regular cocaine user and would "close [local bars] and party till six in the morning".

In August 2018, The Daily Caller ran a story alleging that a Chinese-owned company had hacked then-Secretary of State Hillary Clinton's private email server and successfully obtained nearly all of her emails, citing only, "two sources briefed on the matter". Trump retweeted the allegations made in The Daily Caller's unsubstantiated reporting. The FBI stated that there was no evidence to support the story. In January 2019, The Daily Caller published a story with the misleading headline, "Here's The Photo Some Described as a Nude Selfie of Alexandria Ocasio-Cortez". The photo was not of Ocasio-Cortez, however, and she condemned The Daily Caller's action as "completely disgusting behavior". The Daily Caller apologized for the headline and changed it. The Daily Caller said that the content of the story was not unlike stories published by Vice and The Huffington Post. Vice had already reported that the photo in fact depicted Sydney Leathers, a political activist known for her sexting scandal with former congressman Anthony Weiner.

==== Debunked prostitution allegations regarding Bob Menendez ====
In November 2012, The Daily Caller posted interviews with two women claiming that New Jersey Democratic Senator Bob Menendez had paid them for sex while he was a guest of a campaign donor. The allegation came five days before the 2012 United States Senate election in New Jersey. News organizations such as ABC News, which had also interviewed the women, The New York Times, and the New York Post declined to publish the allegations, viewing them as unsubstantiated and lacking credibility. Subsequently, one of the women who accused Menendez stated that she had been paid to falsely implicate the senator and had never met him. Menendez's office described the allegations as "manufactured" by a right-wing blog as a politically motivated smear.

A few weeks later, police in the Dominican Republic announced that three women had claimed they were paid $300–425 each to lie about having had sex with Menendez, and alleged that the women had been paid to lie about Menendez by an individual claiming to work for The Daily Caller. The website denied this allegation, stating: "At no point did any money change hands between The Daily Caller and any sources or individuals connected with this investigation". Describing what it saw as the unraveling of The Daily Caller' "scoop", the Poynter Institute wrote: "The Daily Caller stands by its reports, though apparently doesn't feel the need to prove its allegations right".

==== Debunked conspiracy theories about Imran Awan ====
In February 2017, Politico and BuzzFeed reported that Capitol Police accused five IT staffers for Democrats in the U.S. House of Representatives of trying to steal House computer equipment and violating House security policies. Congresswoman Debbie Wasserman Schultz was one of several House members who did not terminate the suspected staffers after the criminal complaints. In July 2017, one of the accused staffers, Imran Awan, was arrested for making a false statement on a bank loan application. After his arrest, Wasserman Schultz's office fired Awan.

The Daily Caller pushed conspiracy theories about Awan, seeking to tie Awan to many alleged criminal activities, including unauthorized access to government servers. The reporter behind the coverage of Awan told Fox News that the affair was "straight out of James Bond". An 18-month investigation by federal prosecutors found no evidence of wrongdoing in Awan's work in the House and no support for the conspiracy theories about Awan. In the announcement of the conclusion of the investigation, investigators rebuked a litany of right-wing conspiracy theories about Awan.

== Controversies ==
The Daily Caller has published false stories and declined to correct them when they were shown to be untrue. The website has published articles that contradict the scientific consensus on climate change. In 2018, the website cut ties with an editor linked to white supremacist causes. The website has responded to challenges to its stories in various ways, in some cases defending their claims, and in others expressing regret for story headlines or content; and on at least one occasion, when pointed out by other news outlets, the website has repudiated a past article writer due to support of extremist views.

The website has been involved in several controversial incidents. In March 2015, The Daily Caller columnist Mickey Kaus quit after editor Tucker Carlson refused to run a column critical of Fox News coverage of the immigration policy debate. Carlson, who worked for Fox News at the time, reportedly did not want The Daily Caller publishing criticism of a firm that employed him.

In January 2017, The Daily Caller posted a video which encouraged violence against protesters. The footage showed a car driving into demonstrators, with the headline "Here's A Reel of Cars Plowing Through Protesters Trying to Block the Road". The video clip was set to a cover of the Ludacris song "Move Bitch". The video clip drew attention in August 2017 after a white supremacist murdered one counter-protester and injured 35 more by intentionally driving a car into them at the Unite the Right rally in Charlottesville, Virginia. After the video attracted attention, The Daily Caller deleted it from its website.

In 2018, The Daily Caller was the first news outlet to report on Stefan Halper, a confidential FBI source, and his interactions with Trump campaign advisors Carter Page and George Papadopoulos. Papadopoulos later pleaded guilty to lying to the FBI about campaign matters. Page became the subject of surveillance warrants issued by the United States Foreign Intelligence Surveillance Court regarding contacts with Russian intelligence officials. Other news outlets confirmed Halper's identity but did not report his identity because US intelligence officials warned that it would endanger him and his contacts.

In 2020, during The Daily Caller's coverage of protests in Louisville, Kentucky, related to the killing of Breonna Taylor and subsequent verdict on the police involved, two of their reporters were arrested and held overnight. Co-founder Patel threatened to take legal action against the Louisville Metro Police Department, citing freedom of the press.

In 2025, The Daily Caller published an opinion column by former editor-at-large Geoffrey Ingersoll that called for violence following the assassination of Charlie Kirk. The Daily Caller added in bold italics at the top "... This column reflects the personal views of the author and does not represent the position of the Daily Caller. The examples outlined in the piece refer to hypothetical instances of self-defense, not political violence or extrajudicial mob action. We’ve spoken with the author, who reiterated that is his position, and explicitly rejects any incitement to violence."

=== 2016 presidential election conspiracy theories ===
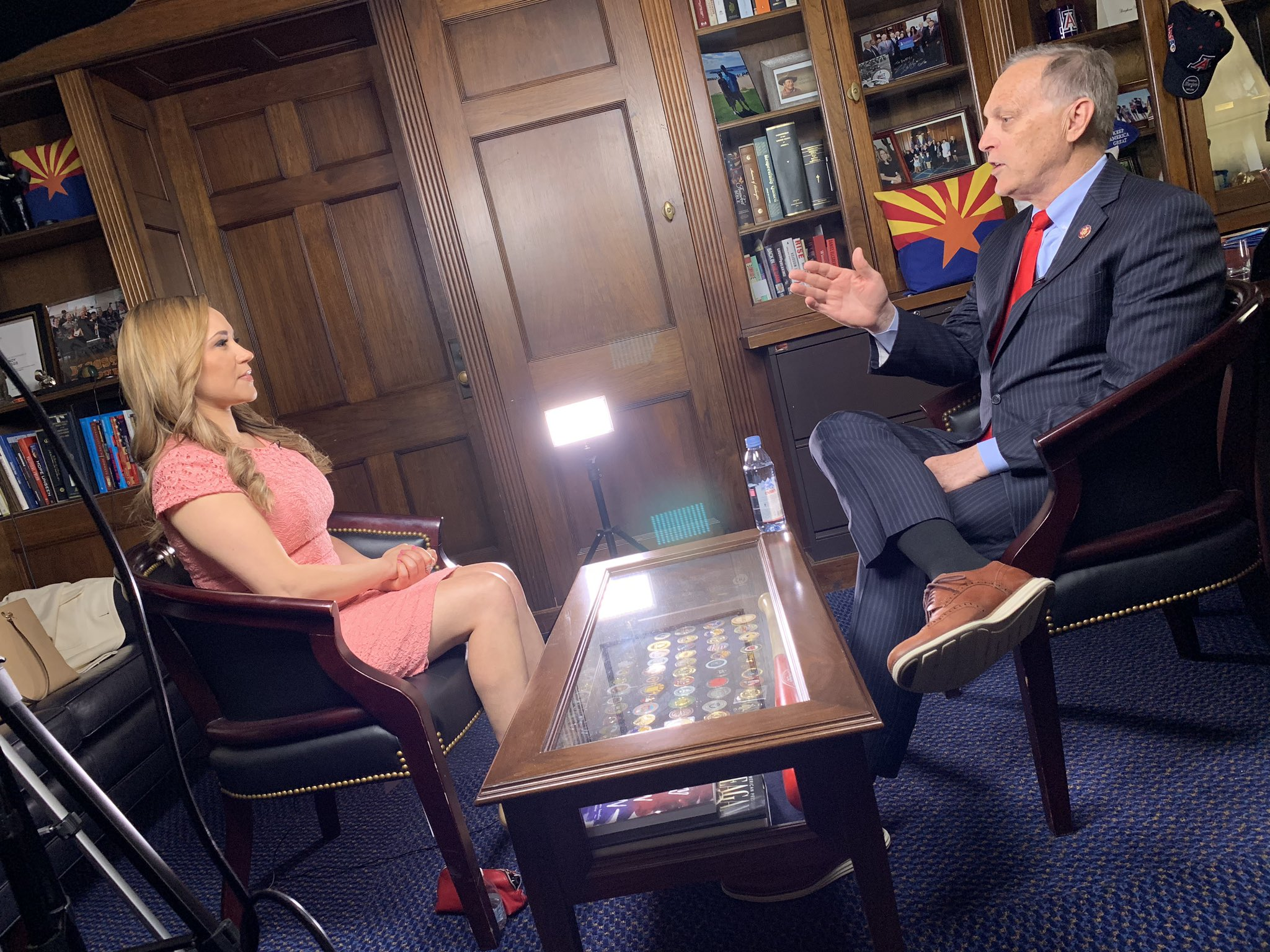
Daily Caller journalist Stephanie Hamill interviewing Republican Congressman Andy Biggs in 2020

According to a study by Harvard University's Berkman Klein Center for Internet and Society, The Daily Caller was among the most popular right-wing news sites during the 2016 United States presidential election. The study found that The Daily Caller provided "amplification and legitimation" for "the most extreme conspiracy sites", such as Truthfeed, InfoWars, The Gateway Pundit and Conservative Treehouse. The Daily Caller also "employed anti-immigrant narratives that echoed sentiments from the alt-right and white nationalists but without the explicitly racist and pro-segregation language".

In one of its most frequently shared stories, The Daily Caller falsely asserted that Morocco's King Mohammed VI flew Bill Clinton on a private jet, and that this had been omitted from the Clinton Foundation's tax disclosures. The Daily Caller also made the "utterly unsubstantiated and unsourced claim" that Hillary Clinton instructed Environmental Protection Agency head Lisa Jackson "to try to shut down Mosaic Fertilizer, described as America's largest phosphate mining company, in exchange for a $15 million donation to the Clinton Foundation from King Mohammed VI of Morocco, ostensibly to benefit Morocco's state-owned phosphate company".

=== 2017 allegation of non-profit abuse ===
According to Callum Borchers of The Washington Post, The Daily Caller has "a peculiar business structure that enables it to increase revenue while reducing its tax obligation". The organization, a for-profit company, does this by relying on its charity arm, the Daily Caller News Foundation, to create the majority of its news content.

Lisa Graves of the Center for Media and Democracy argues, "It's a huge rip-off for taxpayers if the Daily Caller News Foundation is receiving revenue that it doesn't pay taxes on, to produce stories that are used by the for-profit enterprise, which then makes money on the stories through ads". Benjamin M. Leff of American University writes, "But the fact that it also provides its content to other publishers for free is evidence that it is not operated for the private benefit of the for-profit, even if the for-profit is the dominant user of its content".

=== Ties to white supremacists in 2017–2018 ===
Scott Greer was deputy editor and contributor at The Daily Caller. After his departure in June 2018, it was revealed that he published articles espousing white nationalist, racist anti-black and antisemitic views under a pseudonym in white supremacist publications. In September 2018, The Atlantic reported that Greer had written pieces under the pseudonym "Michael McGregor" in the white supremacist publication Radix Journal in 2014 and 2015. In articles for Radix Journal, Greer expressed white nationalist views, as well as racist anti-black and antisemitic views. In his emails and messages, he exchanged anti-Christian and antisemitic comments, with colleagues including Richard Spencer. After being confronted with his past white supremacist writings, Greer resigned from any affiliation with The Daily Caller. In 2017 it was revealed that Greer had ties to members of the white nationalist movement, including friendships with Devin Saucier, assistant to Jared Taylor of American Renaissance, and anti-immigrant activist Marcus Epstein of VDARE, who had pleaded guilty to assaulting an African-American woman two years prior to the beginning of his relationship with Greer. Greer had later deleted parts of his Facebook page, but is seen photographed with white nationalists such as Spencer, Tim Dionisopoulos, the Wolves of Vinland, and also appears wearing clothes belonging to the group Youth for Western Civilization. The Daily Caller subsequently stated about why he had not been fired in 2017: "We had two choices: Fire a young man because of some photos taken of him at metal shows in college, or take his word. We chose to trust him. Now, if what you allege is accurate, we know that trust was a mistake, we know he lied to us. We won't publish him, anyone in these circles, or anyone who thinks like them. People who associate with these losers have no business writing for our company".

Prior to June 2017, The Daily Caller had published freelance articles by Jason Kessler, a white supremacist who organized the Unite the Right rally in August 2017 in Charlottesville, Virginia. That rally took place while Kessler was suspended from The Daily Caller, after ProPublica had found that an article he had written for The Daily Caller about a previous torchlight rally in Charlottesville in May 2017 had not disclosed that he made a speech at the event praising fascist and racist groups. After the suspension, Daily Caller executive editor Paul Conner defended Kessler's article as accurate. The Daily Caller deleted all of Kessler's articles from its website in August 2017 after the Unite the Right rally, which he had organized with Spencer and others, turned into deadly violence.

Until 2017, the website had also published pieces by Peter Brimelow, founder of the white supremacist website VDARE, and by David Hilton, an anti-Semite who has pushed conspiracy theories that Israel was behind the 9/11 attacks. In his articles for The Daily Caller, Hilton promoted anti-Semitic conspiracy theories about George Soros, as well as conspiracy theories about "Cultural Marxism".

The Southern Poverty Law Center (SPLC) reported in 2017 that The Daily Caller had a "white nationalist problem", citing contributions by Kessler, Brimelow, Greer, and Ilana Mercer, whose writing on supposed racially motivated crime in South Africa was also published on the white nationalist website American Renaissance the same day it appeared in The Daily Caller. The SPLC retracted a claim about a Daily Caller reporter, Richard Pollock, stating that except for speaking at a 2017 event of the H.L. Mencken Club, considered a white nationalist group, "there is no evidence to suggest Mr. Pollock is otherwise a white nationalist"; in 2018, according to the SPLC, Pollock cancelled his scheduled attendance at the same group's event.

== Staff, contributors and organization ==
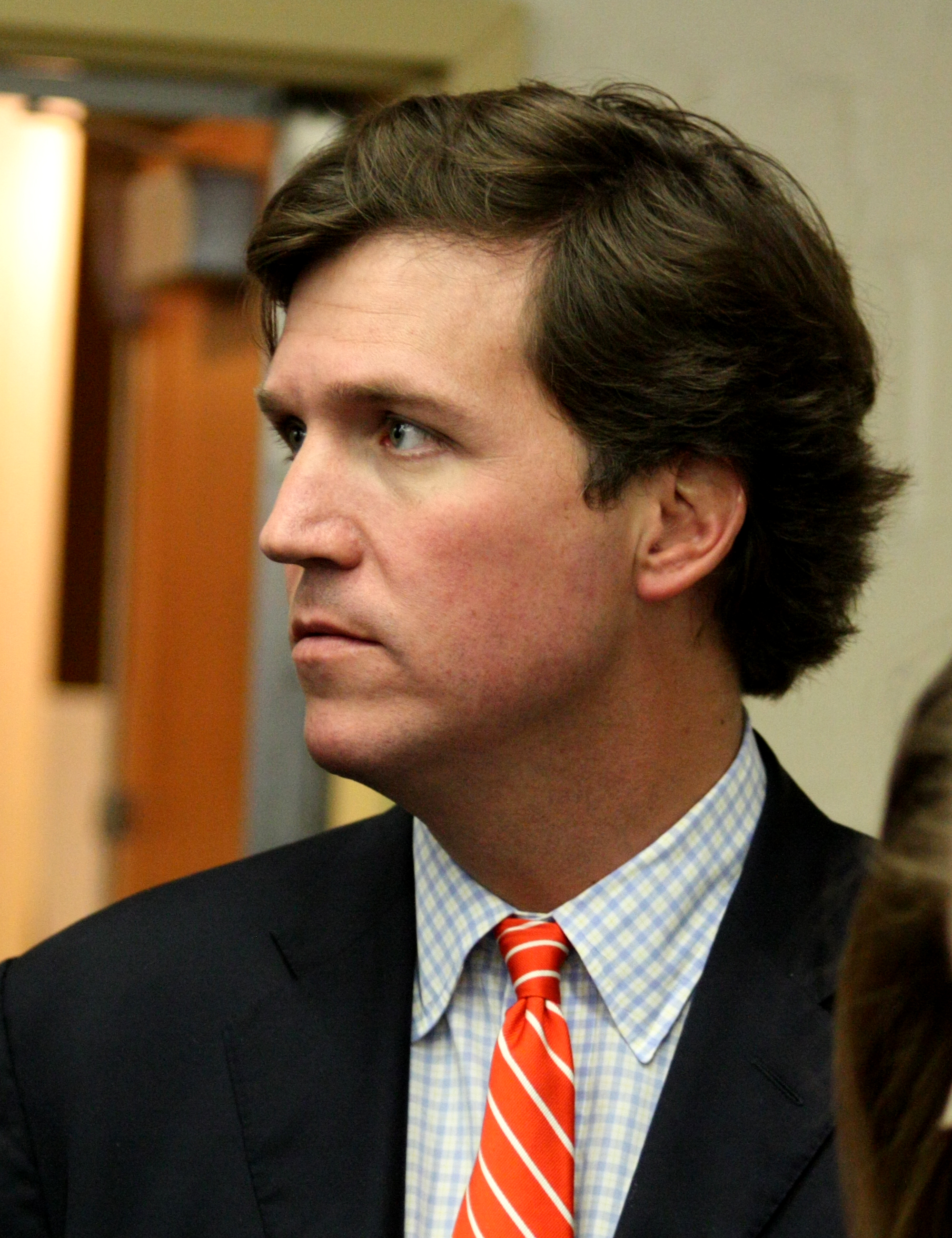
Daily Caller co-founder Tucker Carlson

The Daily Caller is in the White House rotating press pool and has full-time reporters on Capitol Hill.

Contributors to The Daily Caller have included economist Larry Kudlow, Congressman Mark Sanford, former Speaker of the House Newt Gingrich, former US Senate Candidate and Judge Jeanine Pirro, sculptor Robert Mihaly, diplomat Alan Keyes, political commentator Ann Coulter, and the NRA-ILA. Content has also been contributed to the site by Lanny Davis, a former special counsel under Bill Clinton, and by political blogger Mickey Kaus, who quit in 2015.

The Daily Caller hosts The Mirror, a blog written by former FishbowlDC editor and The Hill columnist Betsy Rothstein. The Mirror covers media in Washington D.C., news related to journalism organizations, as well as political and media related gossip. The tagline is, "Reflections of a self-obsessed city".

Billionaire and businessman Charles Koch has made charitable donations to the Daily Caller News Foundation.

== Check Your Fact subsidiary website ==
In 2017, The Daily Caller launched a for-profit subsidiary fact-checking website called Check Your Fact. In 2018, the site was approved by Poynter Institute's International Fact-Checking Network (IFCN) to become a fact-checking partner of Facebook in 2019. The website is editorially independent of The Daily Caller and has its own staff. Scientists and advocates have expressed concern that the partnership could be used to downplay climate articles on Facebook.

== Awards ==
- 2012 The Daily Caller won one of 99 Edward R. Murrow Awards issued by the Radio Television Digital News Association that year, for "Horse Soldiers of 9-11" a documentary by Alex Quade about the first US special forces troops who went into Afghanistan in 2001 on horseback.
- 2012 American Legion Fourth Estate Award for "The Horse Soldiers of 9-11" by Alex Quade
- 2012 Telly Award for "The Horse Soldiers of 9-11" by Alex Quade
