= Occupy Democrats =

American left-wing political Facebook page and website

- Available in: English
- Headquarters: {{{location_country}}}
- Owners: Omar Rivero and Rafael Rivero
- Key people: Grant Stern (executive editor)
- Launched: 2012; 14 years ago
- Current status: Online

Occupy Democrats is an American left-wing media outlet built around a Facebook page and corresponding website. Established in 2012, it publishes hyperpartisan content, clickbait, and false information.

== History ==
Occupy Democrats was established as a Facebook page in 2012 by Rafael and Omar Rivero. A corresponding website was later created but has since closed. Its stated objective is to provide a "counterbalance to the Republican Tea Party".

In September 2022, Occupy Democrats was accused of having raised almost $800,000 for its election fund and donating none of the money to federal candidates. (Note: Originally named Blue Deal, LLC., the Occupy Democrats' company changed its name to Blue Digital Strategies after receiving a cease-and-desist notification from the women-owned business The Blue Deal.) In response to the accusations, Omar Rivero claimed that the fund operated as a super PAC and was barred from donating directly to candidates. Axios journalist Lachlan Markay said that the election fund was actually a hybrid PAC and thus could donate to political candidates. From January 1 of 2025 until June 30 of 2025, Occupy Democrats have raised almost $650,000.

== Founders ==
Omar and Rafael Rivero were born in Mexico in c. 1987, the youngest of seven children. Their mother is American. The family moved to Florida in 1994.

Rafael studied at Swarthmore College in Pennsylvania, where he was a member of the College Republicans. Omar obtained a soccer scholarship at the University of Missouri–Kansas City, but was forced to quit after one year due to experiencing difficulties with playing soccer; he subsequently studied at Cornell University in 2006, where he majored in industrial and labor relations. Omar and Rafael were later diagnosed as having a rare mutation in the MTHFR gene, which causes neuropathy.

In 2007, Rafael worked for Ron Paul; he later said, "I met a lot of bigoted people along the way, and as a Mexican immigrant, I didn't feel comfortable. That was part of my awakening, I would say, away from conservative politics." He and Omar joined Barack Obama's 2008 presidential campaign.

In 2015, Omar joined the advisory board of World Patent Marketing, an invention promotion firm. The firm was shut down in May 2018 after the Federal Trade Commission determined that it was defrauding investors.

In August 2018, Omar launched Liker, a social media platform that was described as being full of misinformation about the Trump administration. Liker shut down in 2021. Omar launched the beta version of Tribel another social media platform, in October 2021; it exited its beta phase in August 2022. That November, The Daily Beast reported that Tribel had an abundance of hateful content despite its "hate-free" branding.

== Influence ==
In a 2017 feature on partisan news, BuzzFeed News analyzed weekly Facebook engagements "since the beginning of 2015 and found that Occupy Democrats on the left and Fox News on the right are the top pages in each political category". The article added that the pages "consistently generate more total engagement than the pages of major media outlets".

Occupy Democrats was named the "Most Influential Progressive Facebook Page" by CrowdTangle in 2015 and by 2017 surpassed 7 million followers. In 2017, Occupy Democrats was among the 30 most frequently shared sources on Facebook. In May 2020, almost half of the 40 top-performing videos that mentioned "Trump" on Facebook originated from Occupy Democrats. As of October 2022, Occupy Democrats had 10 million followers on Facebook and over 498,000 followers on Twitter.

In a paper presented at the 52nd Hawaii International Conference on System Sciences, Argha Ray and Joey George concluded that disinformation propagated by Occupy Democrats "has the potential to further deepen the cracks in an already divided society".

=== 2016 U.S presidential election ===
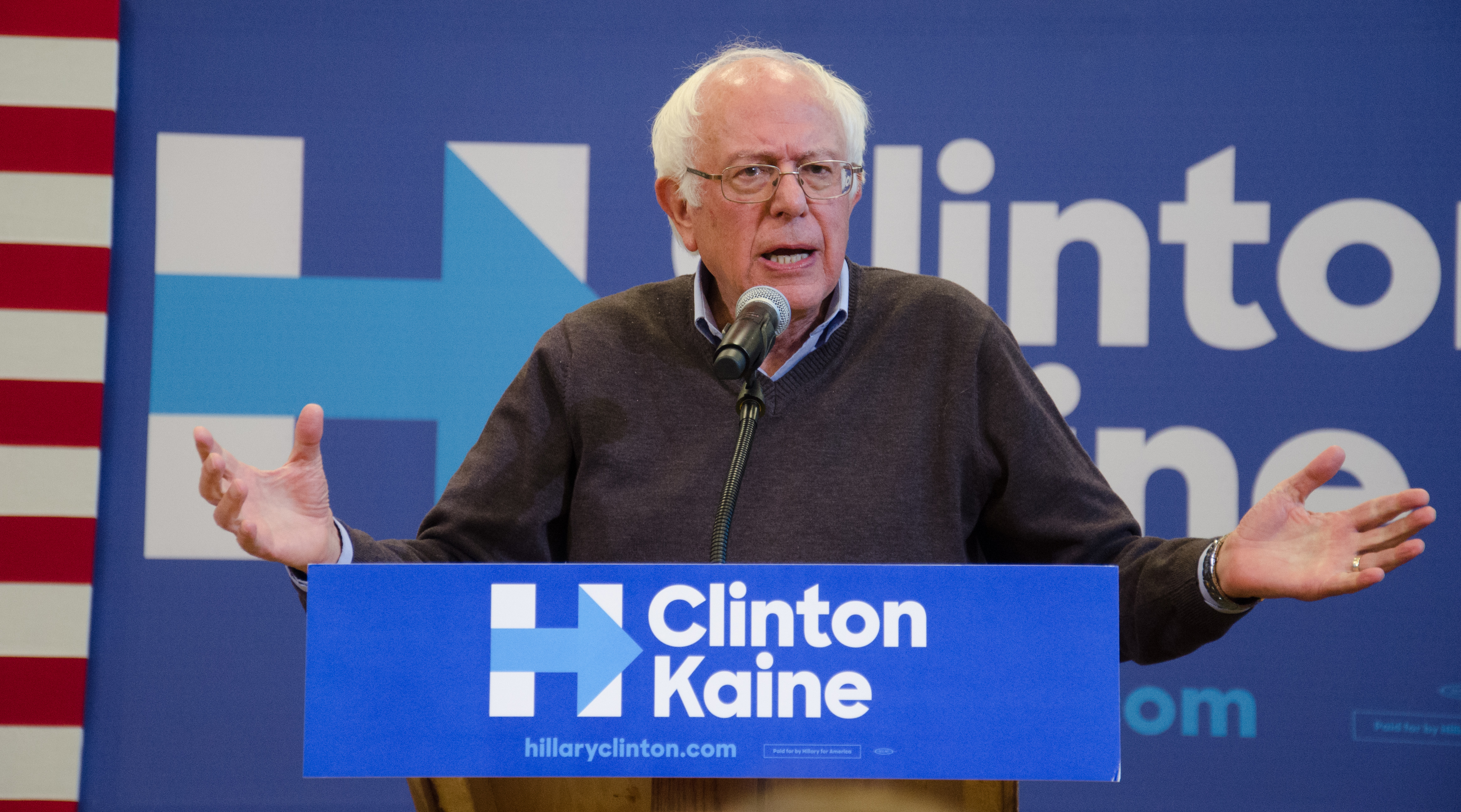
Occupy Democrats was credited with building support for the candidacy of Bernie Sanders (pictured) in the 2016 U.S. presidential election, though it later shifted its support to Hillary Clinton.

The organization received wide attention during the 2016 presidential primaries of the Democratic Party, and was credited for having helped build support for Bernie Sanders' candidacy. The site shifted its support to Hillary Clinton, following her nomination as Democratic Party presidential candidate.

=== 2020 U.S. presidential election ===
According to Rafael Rivero, he was "plugged in" with the Joe Biden 2020 presidential campaign and the campaign worked directly with the outlet to disseminate political messaging. In October 2020, Occupy Democrats experienced a significant drop in its reach on Facebook, which Rivero attributed to action taken by Facebook to throttle traffic, a claim Facebook denied.

=== Biden administration ===
During the presidency of Joe Biden, White House Chief of Staff Ron Klain gave his first interview following the 2022 State of the Union Address on a Twitter Spaces live chat hosted by Occupy Democrats.

== Content ==
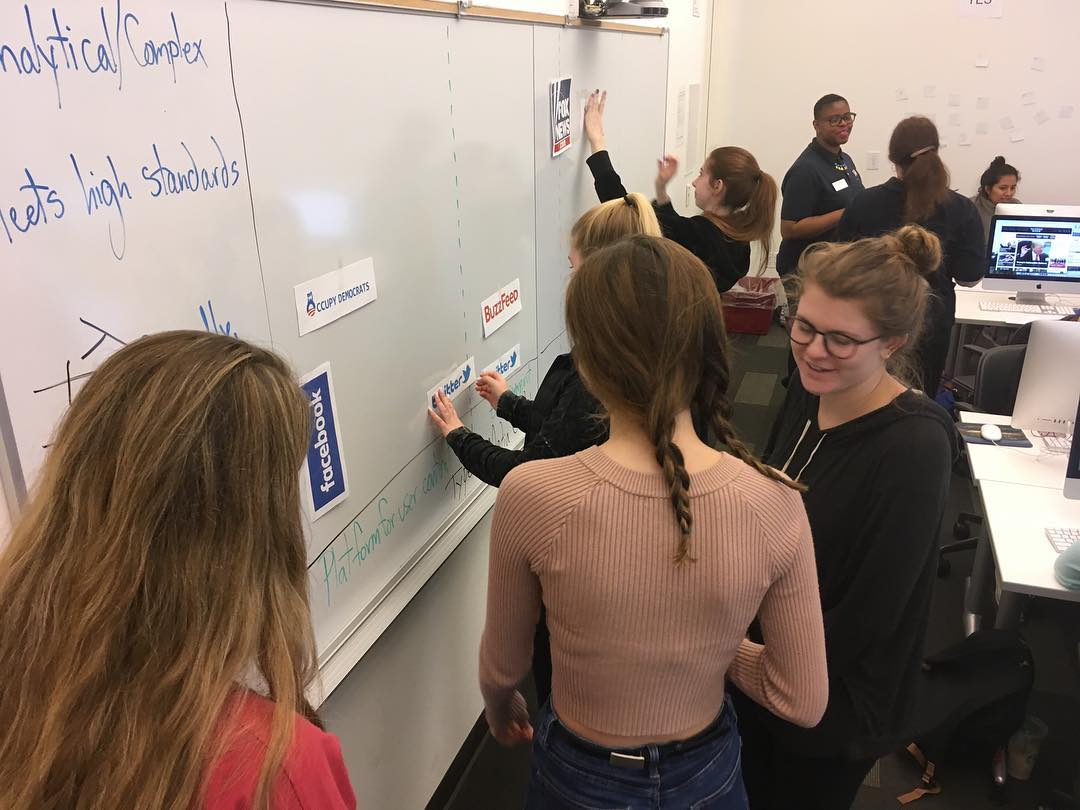
Students at Loyola Marymount University debate the reliability of websites like Occupy Democrats and The Blaze during an instructional event in 2017.

=== Subject matter ===
Occupy Democrats posts memes and content primarily about United States politics. Its content is hyperpartisan, left-oriented, and built around clickbait and hyperbole. Comments to posts shared on Occupy Democrats tend to be hallmarked by "greater anger and incivility" than those of mainstream media Facebook pages and groups.

=== Reception ===
Occupy Democrats has repeatedly been criticized by fact-checking websites for posting "exaggerated or invented news stories". Brooke Binkowski, a managing editor at Snopes, commented that Occupy Democrats' headlines were often "extremely misleading".

According to The Atlantic, Occupy Democrats' posts are "studded with straightforwardly fake news". The Los Angeles Weekly reports that its posts are "free from the constraints of objectivity and, in some cases, facts". In the run-up to the 2020 U.S. presidential election, The New York Times reported that Occupy Democrats "twisted facts to push a critical narrative about Republicans".

In 2017, PolitiFact included Occupy Democrats in its list of fake news websites. However, PolitiFact later removed Occupy Democrats from its list of fake news sites and, according to the Miami New Times, "admitted Occupy Democrats should never have been on the list in the first place". As of December 2020, PolitiFact classified 62% of 16 posts shared by Occupy Democrats it had evaluated as "not accurate". A further 31% it considered "half-true".

In 2021, a post shared by Occupy Democrats claimed Nikki Haley had changed her first name to sound more "white" in order to further her political career. A fact check column by USA Today reported that Nikki was her legal middle name, she had used it as a given name since childhood, and that it was of ethnic Punjabi origin. The same year, Snopes rated "False" a claim by Occupy Democrats that "Republican Congress members had abjectly failed to applaud Biden’s stated goal of drastically reducing the rate of child poverty in the United States" during that year's State of the Union address.

In April 2022, Occupy Democrats claimed that U.S. Senate candidate Josh Mandel had posted to social media a manipulated photo of himself showing his head on the body of a Black woman. The Mandel campaign claimed the assertion was "totally false," independent experts were unable to find signs of manipulation in the image, and PolitiFact rated the claim as "unproven" and "false".

In July 2022, Occupy Democrats posted a photo of Ginni Thomas holding a bottle of wine along with a false caption that the photo was a recent one and showed her celebrating the U.S. Supreme Court's decision in Dobbs v. Jackson Women's Health Organization, though the photo actually predated the decision by several years. The following month, the Associated Press reported that Occupy Democrats "misinterpreted the content of ... [a] Pentagon [press] release" to incorrectly claim that United States President Joe Biden would "not recognize any anti-abortion laws enacted by states" in relation to U.S. Supreme Court decision in Dobbs v. Jackson Women's Health Organization.

In March 2023, Occupy Democrats posted content to its social media channels that claimed "156 congressional Republicans … just voted to RAISE the retirement age to 70 [sic]"; Occupy Democrats' source for the information was a social media post by Twitter user "trom771". FactCheck.org marked the claim as false, while USA Today reported it "found no credible news reports of any such vote taken by Republican congressional members". Later that year, Occupy Democrats shared social media content that, according to USA Today, falsely claimed Donald Trump increased that United States debt more than any president in history. Occupy Democrats also shared social media content that, according to FactCheck.org, misleadingly claimed "that guns were not allowed at the NRA convention and an upcoming GOP event in Utah".

In May 2024, Occupy Democrats posted content to its Facebook page that claimed Donald Trump "told TIME Magazine that in his second term as president he’d force every pregnant woman to submit to constant government monitoring" and that “A vote for Trump is a vote for The Handmaid’s Tale!”. A fact-check by USA Today found that claim to be "False" and clarified that, while Trump did discuss abortion with TIME, "he didn't push for monitoring or even say whether he was for or against the concept".

In a 2017 survey among US readers, Occupy Democrats was voted the "least trusted news source" among American readers, just below Breitbart News and BuzzFeed. In September 2018, the English Wikipedia deprecated Occupy Democrats as a source due to its unreliability. In an October 2018 Simmons Research survey of 38 news organizations, Occupy Democrats was ranked the third least-trusted news organization by Americans, underneath Breitbart News, the Daily Kos and the Palmer Report, with InfoWars and The Daily Caller being lower-ranked.
