= Richard Cameron Freeman =

American judge (1926–1999)

Senior Judge of the United States District Court for the Northern District of Georgia
- In office December 31, 1991 – August 22, 1999

Judge of the United States District Court for the Northern District of Georgia
- In office April 23, 1971 – December 31, 1991
- Appointed by: Richard Nixon
- Preceded by: Seat established by 84 Stat. 294
- Succeeded by: Clarence Cooper

Personal details
- Born: Richard Cameron Freeman; December 14, 1926 Atlanta, Georgia
- Died: August 26, 1999 (aged 72) Atlanta, Georgia
- Education: Emory University (BA, LLB)

Richard Cameron Freeman (December 14, 1926 – August 22, 1999) was a United States district judge of the United States District Court for the Northern District of Georgia.

== Education and career ==
Born in Atlanta, Georgia, Freeman was a private in the United States Army toward the end of World War II, from 1945 to 1946. He received a Bachelor of Arts degree from Emory University in 1950 and a Bachelor of Laws from Emory University School of Law in 1952. He was a claims manager for the Life Insurance Company of Georgia in Atlanta from 1951 to 1954, and was in private practice in Atlanta from 1952 to 1971. He was also a member of the Atlanta Board of Aldermen from 1962 to 1971.

== Federal judicial service ==
On March 3, 1971, Freeman was nominated by President Richard Nixon to a new seat on the United States District Court for the Northern District of Georgia created by 84 Stat. 294. He was confirmed by the United States Senate on April 21, 1971, and received his commission on April 23, 1971. He assumed senior status on December 31, 1991, serving in that capacity until his death on August 22, 1999, in Atlanta.

== Sources ==
Legal offices
Preceded by Seat established by 84 Stat. 294	Judge of the United States District Court for the Northern District of Georgia; 1971–1991	Succeeded by Clarence Cooper
