= Glenda Hatchett =

American lawyer

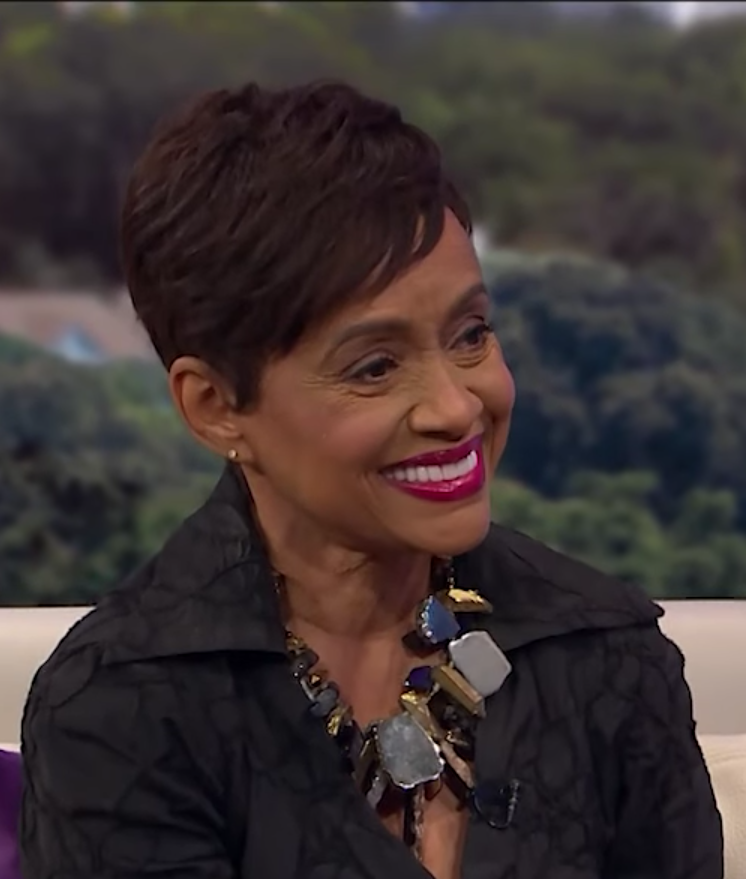

Personal details
- Born: May 31, 1951 (age 75) Atlanta, Georgia, U.S.
- Education: Mount Holyoke College (BA); Emory University (JD)
- Occupation: Judge and Attorney
- Website: www.glendahatchett.com www.thehatchettfirm.com

Glenda A. Hatchett (born May 31, 1951), known professionally as Judge Hatchett, is an American television personality, lawyer, and judge who is the star of the former court show, Judge Hatchett and current day The Verdict with Judge Hatchett, and founding partner at the national law firm, The Hatchett Firm.

== Early life and education ==
Hatchett was born in Atlanta, Georgia. She received her B.A. in political science from Mount Holyoke College in 1973. She has also been recognized as a distinguished alumna and awarded an honorary degree in 2000 by the college. She then attended Emory University School of Law and received her juris doctor degree in 1977.

== Career ==
After graduating from law school, Hatchett completed a coveted federal clerkship in the United States District Court in the Northern District of Georgia, followed by a position at Delta Air Lines. At Delta, Hatchett became the airline's highest-ranking woman of color worldwide, serving both as senior attorney and public relations manager. As senior attorney, Hatchett litigated cases in federal courts throughout the country, and as Manager of Public Relations, she supervised global crisis management, and media relations for all of Europe, Asia and the United States. In fact, her outstanding contributions were recognized by Ebony Magazine, which named Hatchett one of the "100 Best and Brightest Black Women in Corporate America" in January 1990. Due to her commitment to excellence and service within the community, Glenda was awarded the Emory Medal, the highest award given to an alum by the university.

In 1990, Hatchett made the difficult decision to leave Delta Air Lines in order to accept an appointment as Chief Presiding Judge of the Fulton County, Georgia Juvenile Court. Upon accepting the position, Glenda Hatchett became Georgia's first African-American Chief Presiding Judge of a state court and the department head of one of the largest juvenile court systems in the country.

In 2000, Hatchett left Fulton County and began presiding over the nationally syndicated television show, Judge Hatchett which taped regular episodes from 2000-2008. "The Best of Judge Hatchett" currently airs on the WeTV network. The Judge Hatchett Show was nominated for 2 daytime Emmy awards for Outstanding Legal/Courtroom Program in 2008 and 2009. In 2004 Hatchett authored the national best-seller, "Say What You Mean, Mean What You Say" (HarperCollins), and released "Dare to Take Charge: How to Live Your Life on Purpose" in 2010 (CenterStreet), which became a #1 National Bestseller. She has previously served on the Board of Directors of Gap, Inc. the Hospital Corporation of America (HCA), and The Service Master Company. Presently, Hatchett has been a board member of the Atlanta Falcons Football Organization since 2004, and serves on the Board of Advisors for Play Pumps International. She also serves on the Boys and Girls Clubs of America National Board of Governors.

In 2014, she returned to her hometown of Atlanta, Georgia and launched The Hatchett Firm, PC, a national law firm that focuses on Catastrophic Personal Injury, Medical Malpractice, and Class Action lawsuits. In addition to practicing law, Hatchett is a motivational speaker and speaks at conferences and events all across the United States. In 2013, she was the opening keynote speaker at the Pennsylvania Conference for Women 10th Anniversary, where Hillary Clinton gave the closing speech. She is the only speaker in the Conference's 10-year history to be invited to speak more than once. In 2015, she delivered the Holmes-Hunter Lecture at the University of Georgia, honoring Charlayne Hunter-Gault and the late Hamilton Holmes, who in 1961 became the first African-American students to enroll at UGA.

Hatchett has appeared on numerous media outlets as a guest commentator and legal analyst on national issues. She has appeared over a dozen times on CNN as a guest commentator, and as a guest on The View, Jimmy Kimmel Live!, The Mo'Nique Show, and The Young and the Restless.

In April 2015, Hatchett announced that she signed on to return to television with a new court show, The Verdict with Judge Hatchett set to air Fall 2016 under Entertainment Studios.

On July 11, 2016, her law firm announced that they will be representing the family of Philando Castile in all civil legal matters.

== Personal life ==
On an episode of Judge Hatchett, Hatchett had her DNA tested and it was revealed that she has ancestry descending from the Yoruba and Hausa people of Nigeria. She currently resides in Atlanta, Georgia with her two sons.

== Books ==
- Say What You Mean and Mean What You Say! 7 Simple Strategies to Help Our Children Along the Path to Purpose and Possibility (Harper Collins, 2003) (2004 paperback published with subtitle Saving Your Child from a Troubled World.)
- Dare to Take Charge: How to Live Your Life on Purpose (Center Street, 2010)
