= Judge Hatchett =

American reality court show (2000–2008)

- Genre: Arbitration-based reality court show
- Starring: Glenda Hatchett (judge); Tom O' Riordan (bailiff)
- Country of origin: United States
- Original language: English
- No. of seasons: 8
- No. of episodes: 1,630

Production
- Camera setup: Multiple
- Running time: 30 minutes
- Production company: Sony Pictures Television (Note: Credited as Columbia TriStar Television (2000–2001; season 1) and Columbia TriStar Domestic Television (2001–2002; seasons 2–3).)

Original release
- Network: Syndication
- Release: September 4, 2000 – May 23, 2008

Judge Hatchett is an American arbitration-based reality court show, produced and distributed by Sony Pictures Television. The series premiered on September 4, 2000, and ran for eight seasons until its cancellation on May 23, 2008. It was Sony Pictures' first court show.

This series is unrelated to the Glenda Hatchett series that started in 2016, The Verdict With Judge Hatchett, which is produced by Entertainment Studios.

== Judge Glenda Hatchett ==
The series starred Glenda Hatchett and was modeled after other "court shows" such as Judge Judy and the long running The People's Court, as well as containing elements from tabloid talk shows such as Sally, The Richard Bey Show, and Maury Povich. In addition to dealing with traditional small-claims lawsuits (with a plaintiff, defendant, and monetary awards sought), she also handled DNA paternity tests and out of control teens. Originally, gentle and compassionate, Hatchett would later become a more scurrilous and scalding disciplinarian, intent on teaching young people a lesson by sending them on corrective trips. The show would follow these youths on the corrective trips that Hatchett sent them on.

Judge Hatchett ran interventions for troubled teens. Among Judge Hatchett's recommendations for intervention and other help were Tommy the Clown, an eighteen-year-old mayor, prisons and Yolanda King (daughter of Martin Luther King Jr.). On one occasion, Judge Hatchett ran an intervention herself, running the building of an outdoor theater which ended up being named after her as a thanks. It was filmed at the Chelsea Studios in New York City.

After Judge Hatchett drew low ratings and key ABC Owned and Operated Stations began dropping the show, SPT made the decision to cancel the show. It has continued in reruns since then. Reruns aired on Black Entertainment Television, and was also offered by Sony in a barter package meant for low-rated stations looking to find content between 2009 and 2012. Reruns also aired on WE TV for a short time in late 2014.
