= Clarence Cooper (judge) =

American judge (born 1942)

Senior Judge of the United States District Court for the Northern District of Georgia
- Incumbent
- Assumed office February 9, 2009

Judge of the United States District Court for the Northern District of Georgia
- In office May 9, 1994 – February 9, 2009
- Appointed by: Bill Clinton
- Preceded by: Richard Cameron Freeman
- Succeeded by: Mark Howard Cohen

Judge of the Georgia Court of Appeals
- In office 1990–1994
- Appointed by: Joe Frank Harris

Personal details
- Born: May 5, 1942 (age 84) Decatur, Georgia, U.S.
- Spouse: Shirley M. Elder
- Children: Two
- Education: Clark College (BA); Emory University (JD); Harvard University (MPA)

Military service
- Branch/service: United States Army
- Years of service: 1968–1970
- Rank: Staff Sergeant
- Battles/wars: Vietnam War

Clarence Cooper (born May 5, 1942) is an American lawyer and jurist serving as an inactive senior United States district judge of the United States District Court for the Northern District of Georgia.

== Early life and education ==
Cooper was born in Decatur, Georgia. He graduated from David T. Howard High School in 1960. He received a Bachelor degree from Clark College in Atlanta, Georgia in 1964. He received a Juris Doctor from Emory University School of Law in 1967. He is a member of the Omega Psi Phi fraternity. Cooper received a Master of Public Administration from Harvard University, John F. Kennedy School of Government in 1978. He also received a diploma from Massachusetts Institute of Technology in connection with a research proposal he developed.

== Career ==
He served in the United States Army from 1968 to 1970 reaching the rank of Staff Sergeant. He was decorated with the Bronze Star, a Certificate of Commendation, the National Defense Service Medal, the Army Good Conduct Medal, the Vietnam Service Medal, and the Vietnam Campaign Medal.

=== State judicial service ===
He worked as an attorney for the Atlanta Legal Aid Society in 1967. He served as an assistant district attorney of Fulton County in 1968 and from 1970 to 1975. Cooper then served as a judge on the City of Atlanta Municipal Court from 1975 to 1980. Cooper was the first African-American appointed to a full-time judgeship on the Atlanta Municipal Court and the first African-American ever elected to a county-wide judgeship on the Fulton Superior Court. He was also the first African American assistant district attorney hired to a State Prosecutor's office in Georgia in 1968. Judge Cooper was the presiding Judge in the trial of Wayne Williams, the prime suspect in the Atlanta child murders, who was convicted of the murders of Jimmy Payne and Nathaniel Cater. He was a judge on the Fulton Superior Court, Georgia from 1980 to 1990. He was a judge on the Georgia Court of Appeals.

=== Federal judicial service ===
Cooper was nominated by President Bill Clinton to be a United States District Judge of the United States District Court for the Northern District of Georgia on March 9, 1994, to a seat vacated by Richard Cameron Freeman. Cooper was confirmed by the United States Senate on May 6, 1994, and received his commission on May 9, 1994. He assumed senior status on February 9, 2009, and inactive senior status in September 2021.

=== Cases ===
Cooper ordered an Atlanta school system to remove stickers from textbooks which call the theory of evolution "a theory, not a fact." In the case Selman v. Cobb County School District, he ruled that these stickers are an endorsement of religion and as such violate the Establishment Clause of the US Constitution.

Cooper was assigned to the case of Whitaker v. Perdue, a federal challenge to Georgia House Bill 1059 which requires that registered sexual offenders cannot live or work within 1,000 feet from schools, school bus stops, churches, day care centers, and areas where children gather, such as parks, recreation centers, playgrounds, swimming pools, etc. In July 2006, Judge Cooper issued a restraining order barring enforcement of the law near the vicinity of bus stops. In August, he certified a class-action lawsuit on behalf of all of Georgia's 11,000 registered sex offenders instead of just the eight plaintiffs. On March 30, 2007, the judge dismissed some of the plaintiff's claims from the suit, including the claim that the law represented cruel and unusual punishment; the rest of the case will go forward. Plaintiff's lawyers had until June 1, 2007, to file a new, revised complaint.

== Personal life ==
Cooper's wife, Shirley Cooper, was the first black food service coordinator for Fulton County School System. Cooper has two children.

== Namesake awards ==
- Judge Clarence Cooper Judicial Section Award (this award is given to jurists for outstanding service to the judiciary and the community).
- Judge Clarence Cooper Legacy Award

== Awards and honors ==
- 2002 National Black College Hall of Fame
- 2010 Trumpet Award Honoree IMDB
- 2011 Emory History Makers
- 2022 Emory Medal

== See also ==
- List of African-American federal judges
- List of African-American jurists

Legal offices
Preceded by Richard Cameron Freeman	Judge of the United States District Court for the Northern District of Georgia; 1994–2009	Succeeded by Mark Howard Cohen
