= Mark Howard Cohen =

American judge (born 1955)

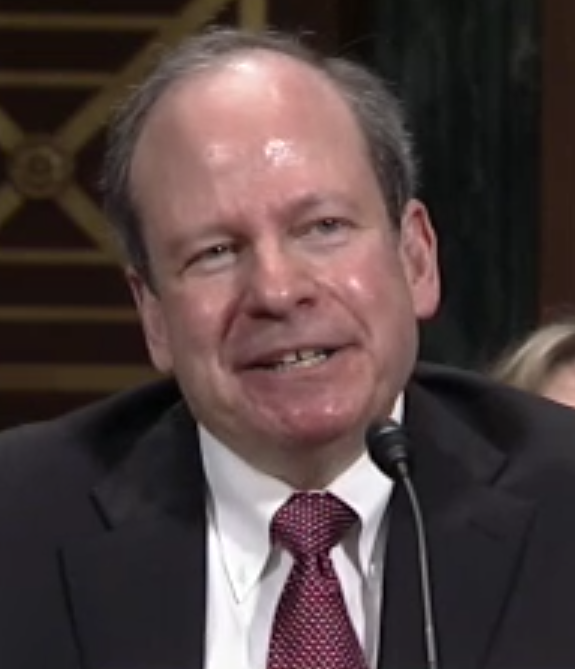
- Cohen in 2014

Judge of the United States District Court for the Northern District of Georgia
- Incumbent
- Assumed office November 20, 2014
- Appointed by: Barack Obama
- Preceded by: Clarence Cooper

Personal details
- Born: Mark Howard Cohen; June 11, 1955 (age 71) Miami Beach, Florida, U.S.
- Education: Emory University (BA, JD)

Mark Howard Cohen (born June 11, 1955) is a United States district judge of the United States District Court for the Northern District of Georgia.

== Biography ==
Cohen received a Bachelor of Arts degree, magna cum laude, in 1976 from Emory University. He received a Juris Doctor in 1979 from Emory University School of Law. He began his career as a law clerk to United States magistrate judge Joel M. Feldman of the United States District Court for the Northern District of Georgia, from 1979 to 1981. From 1981 to 1994, he worked in the Georgia Attorney General's Office, where he represented state agencies in federal and state litigation. In 1995, he served as Chief State Administrative Law Judge and managed the newly created Office of State Administrative Hearings in Georgia. He then worked for Georgia Governor Zell Miller, serving as executive counsel from 1995 to 1998 and executive secretary from 1998 to 1999. From 1999 to 2014, he worked at the Atlanta law firm of Troutman Sanders LLP, making partner in 2001.

=== Federal judicial service ===
On December 19, 2013, President Barack Obama nominated Cohen to serve as a United States district judge of the United States District Court for the Northern District of Georgia, to the seat vacated by Judge Clarence Cooper, who assumed senior status on February 9, 2009. He received a hearing before the Senate Judiciary Committee on May 13, 2014. On June 19, 2014, his nomination was reported out of committee by a voice vote. On November 12, 2014, Senate Majority Leader Harry Reid filed for cloture on Cohen's nomination. On November 17, 2014, the United States Senate invoked cloture on his nomination by a 67–29 vote. On November 18, 2014, he was confirmed by a voice vote. He received his judicial commission on November 20, 2014.

Legal offices
Preceded by Clarence Cooper	Judge of the United States District Court for the Northern District of Georgia; 2014–present	Incumbent
