= Neil Patel (political advisor) =

British-American political advisor

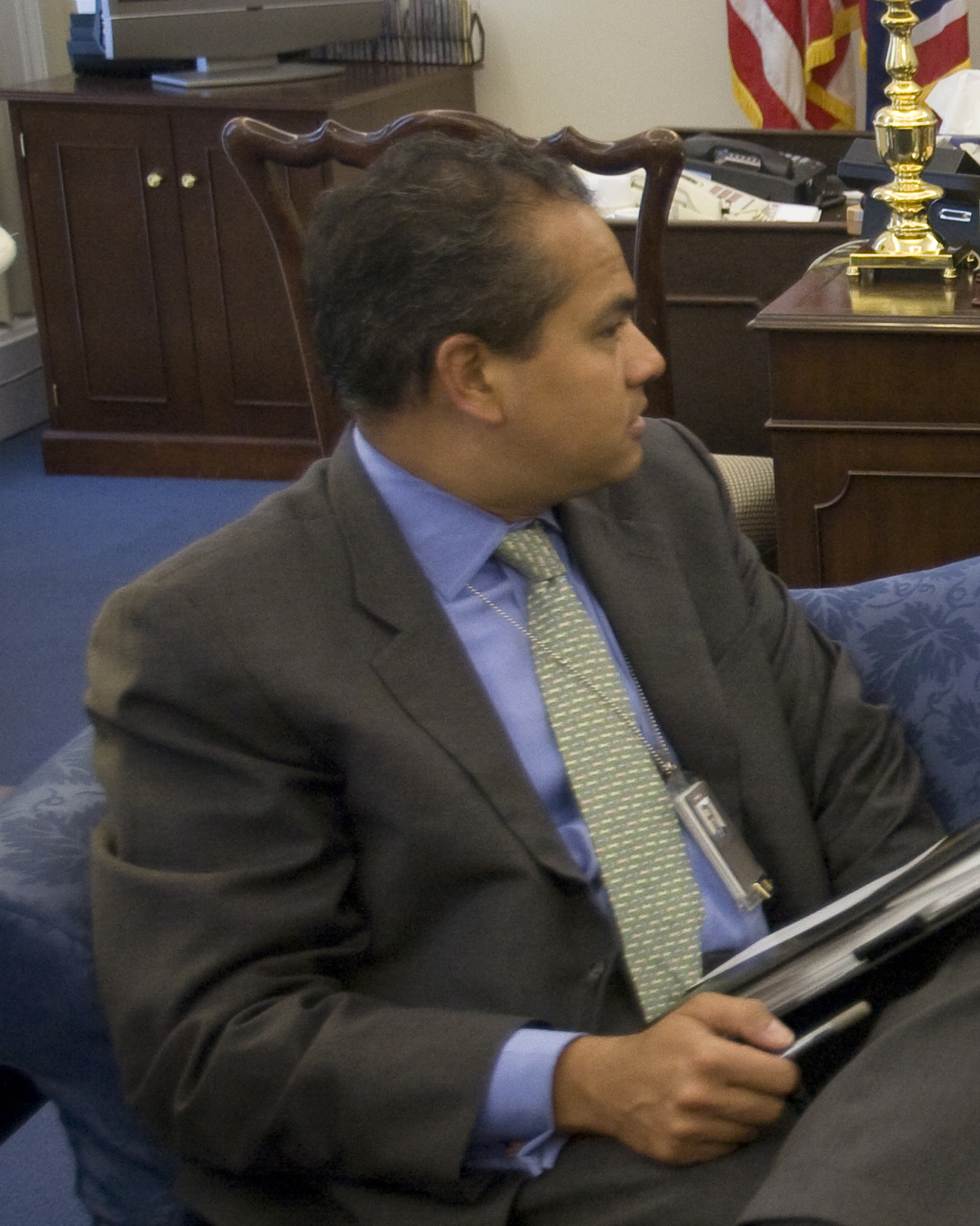
- Patel in 2008
- Born: 1970 (age 55–56); Scotland
- Education: Trinity College (BA); Georgetown University (JD)
- Known for: Founder of The Daily Caller
- Political party: Republican

Neil Patel (/pəˈtɛl/) (born 1970) is a British-American lawyer, hedge fund manager, conservative political advisor, and publisher. He is the co-founder and publisher of The Daily Caller.

== Early life and education ==
Patel was born in Scotland and moved to the United States at age three. He graduated from Worcester Academy and received his B.A. from Trinity College in Connecticut. At Trinity, Patel roomed with Tucker Carlson. Patel holds a J.D. from the Georgetown University Law Center, where he was an associate editor of the Georgetown Journal of International Law. He is of Indian descent.

== Career ==
Patel served as Scooter Libby's deputy before becoming chief policy advisor to Vice President Dick Cheney. In his role as an advisor to Cheney, Patel represented the Vice President at White House economic and domestic policy meetings, interacted with the business community on behalf of the Vice President, and managed the Vice President's policy staff. He also served as Staff Secretary to the Vice President, managing the flow of all documents to and from Cheney, including classified information.

Patel was nominated by the Bush White House to run the National Telecommunications and Information Administration, but he was not confirmed.

After leaving the vice president's office in 2009, Patel co-partnered with Tucker Carlson to co-founded The Daily Caller, a conservative news and opinion website. Carlson sold his one-third stake in The Daily Caller to Patel in June 2020.

Patel co-founded and is managing director of Bluebird Asset Management, a hedge fund focusing on mortgage-backed securities.
