= StockX =

Online marketplace and reseller, primarily of clothing and sneakers

- Type: Private
- Industry: E-commerce
- Predecessor: Campless
- Founded: March 2015; 11 years ago
- Founders: Dan Gilbert; Josh Luber; Greg Schwartz; Chris Kaufman
- Headquarters: Detroit, Michigan, U.S.
- Key people: Greg Schwartz (CEO); Stephen Winn (Chief Product Officer); Nick Karrat (Chief Marketing Officer)
- Number of employees: 1,200 (2021)
- Website: stockx.com

StockX is an online marketplace and clothing reseller, primarily of sneakers. Since November 2020, it has also opened up to electronic products such as game consoles, smartphones and computer hardware. The Detroit-based company was founded by Dan Gilbert, Josh Luber, Greg Schwartz, and Chris Kaufman in 2015–2016. StockX has more than 800 employees in Downtown Detroit. StockX currently has international offices in London, UK, in Eindhoven, the Netherlands, and has authentication facilities in Detroit's Corktown neighborhood, Moonachie, NJ, and Tempe, AZ. Greg Schwartz is chief executive officer.

== History and operations ==
The startup company was founded by Dan Gilbert, Josh Luber, Greg Schwartz, and Chris Kaufman in 2015, and launched in February 2016. Luber had previously founded StockX's predecessor website about rare sneakers called Campless (established during 2012–2013), a site which was featured in Josh Luber's TED Talk on the sneaker market. After Gilbert acquired Campless from Luber, Luber relocated from Philadelphia to work from Gilbert's One Campus Martius building in Downtown Detroit as chief executive officer. StockX opened its first international headquarters in London in October 2018. Scott Cutler was appointed chief executive officer in June 2019.

The company has more than 800 employees, as of August 2019. StockX is among the fastest-growing startups in Detroit and Michigan, as of late 2018.

In addition to the One Campus Martius office, StockX has an authentication facility in Detroit's Corktown neighborhood. Prior to the authentication center's relocation in June 2018, the company had a team of 15 employees authenticating thousands of pairs of shoes daily. The larger Corktown facility increased the number of authentications. StockX opened a second authentication center in Tempe, Arizona, in late 2018, followed by two more in Moonachie, New Jersey, and West London. In 2019, the company opened a fifth authentication center in Eindhoven, Netherlands. StockX maintains a catalog of all fake items received.

Annual sales on StockX platform in the United States, including shoe models belonging to two different brands (YEEZY and NIKE x Off-White)

The company's first "StockX Day" event in Detroit, which invited resellers, platform users, and industry influencers to meet employees and see operations, was held in October 2017 and attended by approximately 200 people. 150 buyers and sellers were selected from 3,000–5,000 applicants to attend the second "StockX Day" in April 2018. In May 2019, the company held a third "StockX Day" event for an audience of 300 and announced the opening of its first permanent location in New York City along with several major product updates.

StockX has collaborated with numerous celebrities and companies on charitable initiatives. In 2017, Eminem collaborated with the company to raffle off his Air Jordan sneakers designed in collaboration with Carhartt to raise funds for the Greater Houston Community Foundation Hurricane Harvey Relief Fund and Team Rubicon to support relief efforts in Texas and Florida following Hurricane Harvey. Nike Inc.'s debut of LeBron James' first retro sneaker via StockX marked the first time the brand bypassed retail and went directly to the secondary market. In 2018, StockX and Wu-Tang Clan collaborated on the Charity Rules Everyone Around Me (C.R.E.A.M.) campaign; proceeds from nine exclusive products benefitted the Wu-Tang Foundation to support children in underserved communities.

StockX suffered a data breach in mid-2019. In September, the company and Bleacher Report reached a multiyear advertising agreement, and Deena Bahri became StockX's first chief marketing officer.

In September 2020, StockX co-founder Josh Luber left the company.

In November 2021, StockX announced that it had signed UConn basketball player Paige Bueckers as its primary spokesperson for its basketball and women's sports lines.

In January 2022, StockX announced the ability to buy and sell NFTs on its marketplace.

== Business model ==
StockX is an online marketplace, facilitating auctions between sellers and buyers, then collecting transaction and payment fees. Sellers send purchased items to StockX facilities for inspection and verification, then authenticated products are shipped to buyers. StockX features a "stock market-like" variable pricing framework and discloses price histories for specific items. StockX is most known for sneakers and streetwear but also carries other clothing and accessories such as handbags and watches. StockX surpassed eBay in total sneaker transactions in 2017. Counterfeit items are returned to sellers, and buyers are refunded.

StockX charges a 3 percent processing fee for all resellers, and a 9.5 percent transaction fee for new users, which decreases with experience. Prior to the company's expansion into Europe, StockX only advertised in the United States and accepted U.S dollars. Fifteen percent of the company's buyers were international, as of September 2018.

In January 2019, StockX partnered with celebrity jeweler and influencer Ben Baller to sell 800 pairs of black and red slides directly to the public, marking the company's first "initial product offering" ("I.P.O."). The shoes were printed with the phrase "Ben Baller did the chain", a lyric from ASAP Ferg's song "Plain Jane" (2017).

=== Funding ===
StockX has received financial backing from Gilbert, investment companies Battery Ventures and GV, as well as Scooter Braun, Jon Buscemi, Eminem, Joe Haden, Ted Leonsis, and Mark Wahlberg. The company raised $6 million in February 2017. StockX received $44 million in a second venture round in September 2018. In addition to Battery and GV, investors included Steve Aoki, Marc Benioff, Don C, and Karlie Kloss. The investment helped fund StockX's international expansion.

In June 2019, StockX raised $110 million and was valued at $1 billion in another venture round. Investors included General Atlantic, GGV Capital, and Yuri Milner's firm DST Global, in addition to Battery Ventures and GV.

As of April 8, 2021 an article by Reuters states "Sneaker marketplace StockX said on Thursday it had raised $255 million in a late-stage financing round, valuing the company at more than $3.8 billion."
