= Josh Luber =

American entrepreneur (born 1978)

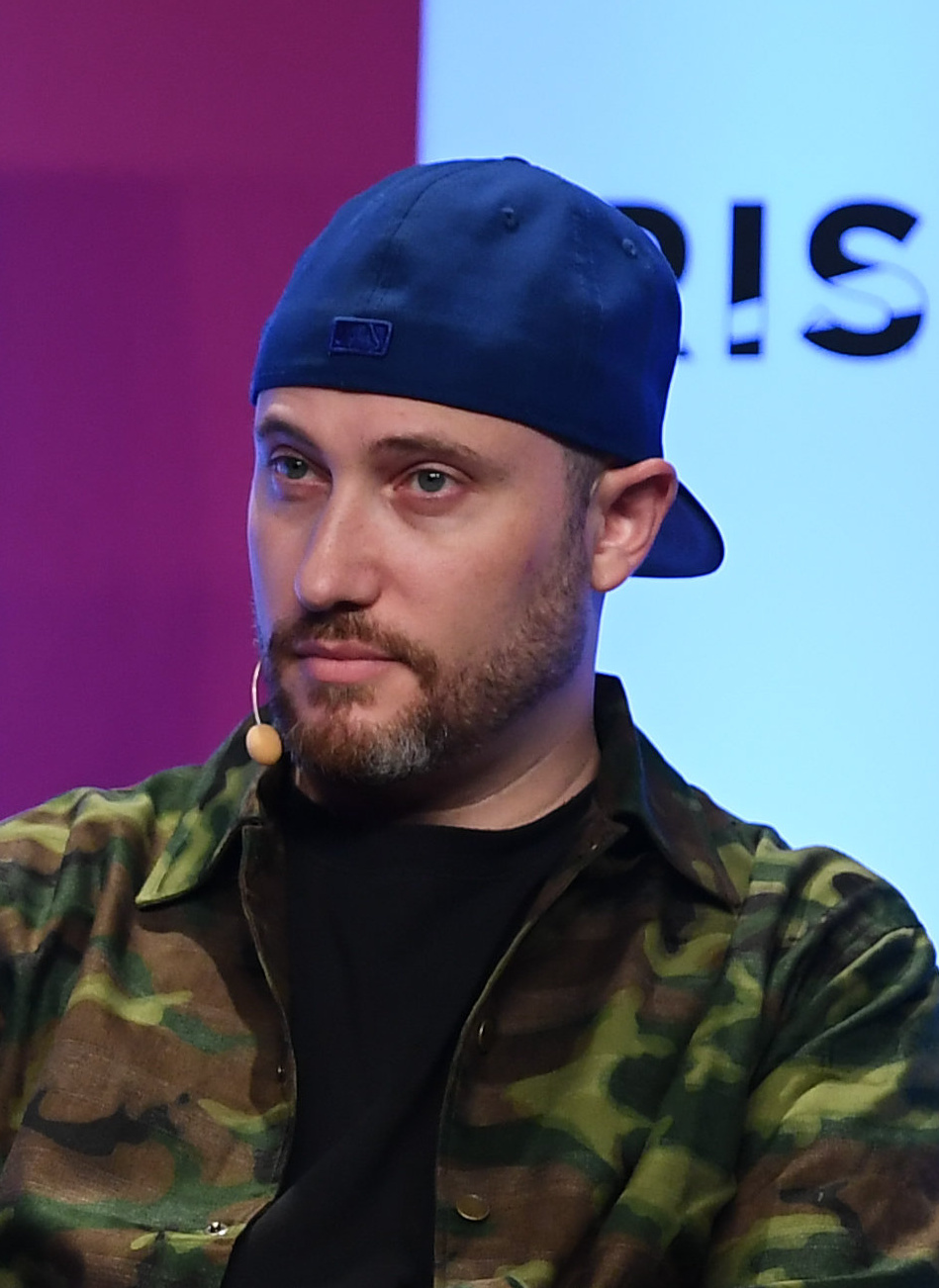
- Born: February 18, 1978 (age 48); Philadelphia, Pennsylvania, U.S.
- Citizenship: United States
- Education: Emory University (BA, MBA, JD)
- Occupation: Entrepreneur
- Known for: Fanatics Collectibles, StockX, Campless
- Children: One daughter, one son

Joshua Eliot Luber (born February 18, 1978) is an American entrepreneur and sneaker collector who co-founded StockX, the stock market for things. Luber worked for IBM when he founded Campless, a "sneakerhead data" company that tracked the secondary market for sneaker sales. Campless then morphed into StockX, which is an online marketplace for high-end product resale.

Luber is an expert on the sneaker resale market, and has applied that knowledge to the broader secondary market for luxury goods, a $6 billion global industry. Originally from Philadelphia, Luber is a graduate of Emory University, from which he holds a Bachelors, a M.B.A., and a J.D.

StockX was jointly founded by Dan Gilbert, Greg Schwartz, Josh Luber and Chris Kaufman in 2015, with an emphasis on the sneaker resale market. Until mid-2019, Luber was the CEO of StockX. However, he stepped down from that role upon raising a Series C, $110 million round of venture capital funding at a $1 Billion valuation for the company.

After leaving StockX, he co-founded Fanatics Collectibles, a subsidiary of Fanatics, with Michael Rubin. Operating as Chief Vision Officer, Luber secured exclusive trading card manufacturing and distribution rights from MLB, MLBPA, NBA, NBPA and NFLPA, raised $350 million in funding at a $10.4 billion dollar valuation, and oversaw the acquisition of Topps.

== Personal life ==
Luber lives with his wife and one daughter and one son in Birmingham, Michigan.
