= Shivana Jorawar =

American lawyer

- Born: Shivana Jorawar; United States
- Education: Fordham University (BA); Emory University (JD)
- Occupations: legal advocate, community organizer
- Years active: 2011–present

Shivana Jorawar is an American lawyer, reproductive justice advocate, and community organizer. She is of Asian-American Indo-Caribbean heritage.

== Biography ==
Shivana Jorawar credits the tragedy of the September 11 attacks, together with the xenophobia that resulted from them, with shaping her solidarity with the South Asian community and her decision to become an activist. In 2007, she co-founded Jahajee Sisters, an organization based in New York City to build empowerment for Indo-Caribbean women.

In 2011, she graduated from Emory University School of Law. She has worked as a legal clerk in the New York State Division of Human Rights, the American Civil Liberties Union of Georgia, and the Equal Employment Opportunity Commission. Jorawar worked at the National Asian Pacific American Women’s Forum in Washington, D.C., leading that organizations's reproductive justice programming. She also served as a legislative lawyer at the National Abortion Federation and the Center for Reproductive Rights before stepping in to co-lead Jahajee Sisters in New York City.

Jorawar has written numerous articles and lectured on the experiences of Asian-Americans/Pacific Islander Americans and the law, including articles on feticide prosecutions, abortion, and women's rights to control their own reproductive choices. She has been interviewed by mainstream media in an attempt to understand the issues which impact minority and immigrant women's lives.
