= Public Square (company) =

American online marketplace

PSQ Holdings Inc.
- Trade name: Public Square
- Type: Public
- Traded as: NYSE: PSQH
- Industry: Online marketplace
- Founded: 2021; 5 years ago
- Founder: Michael Seifert
- Headquarters: West Palm Beach, Florida, United States
- Number of locations: 55,000+ small businesses (as of July 2023)
- Area served: United States
- Key people: Omeed Malik (Board of Directors); Nick Ayers (Board of Directors); Blake Masters (Board of Directors); Kelly L. Loeffler (Board of Directors); Donald Trump Jr. (Board of Directors)
- Services: E-commerce, online marketplace
- Website: www.publicsquare.com

PublicSq. (Public Square) is an American online marketplace which bills itself as "anti-woke" and supportive of the pro-life movement and conservatism. It was founded by Michael Seifert and is headquartered in West Palm Beach, Florida. As of July 2023, the platform hosts over 55,000 small businesses. The company is publicly traded as PSQH on the New York Stock Exchange.

== History ==
Public Square was founded by Michael Seifert in 2021 as an alternative to Amazon. It was initially based in San Diego. The platform officially launched on July 4, 2022.

In 2023, the board of directors was chosen to include Michael Seifert, Omeed Malik, Nick Ayers, and Blake Masters.

In February 2023, the company announced that it would consolidate with the special-purpose acquisition company Colombier Acquisition Group for $200 million in order to go public.

In June 2023, the company announced it was awarding a "baby bonus" to employees that decide to have or adopt a child.

In July 2023, former United States Senator Kelly L. Loeffler was appointed to the company's board of directors.

In July 2023, the company went public on the New York Stock Exchange as PSQ Holdings Inc. People on the floor of the stock market chanted "U-S-A!". That same month, the company became the first major advertiser on Tucker Carlson's new show on Twitter.

In November 2023, Bloomberg reported that the company has looked for loopholes in environmental, social, and governance (ESG) rules.

On November 6, 2023, it hosted its first official Town Hall in Indianapolis featuring Indiana congressman Jim Banks and Donald Trump Jr.

In March 2024, Public Square acquired the buy now, pay later firm Credova which focuses on processing the sales of firearms.

In December 2024, it was announced that Donald Trump Jr. was joining the board of directors.

In January 2026, Michael Seifert resigned as CEO.

As of July 2026, the website now redirects to Credova.com.
