= Ellis Jones (sociologist) =

American sociologist

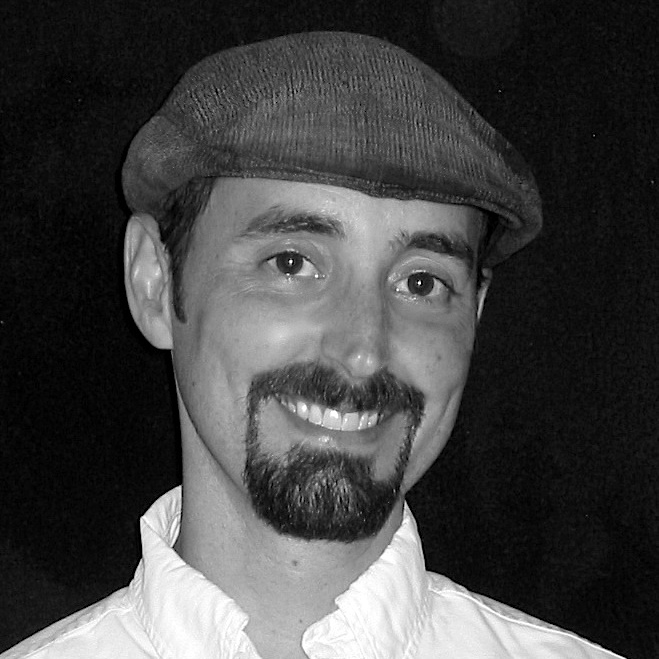
- Born: February 25, 1970 (age 56)

Academic background
- Education: University of Colorado, Boulder
- Thesis: Social Responsibility Activism: Why Individuals Are Changing Their Lifestyles to Change The World (2002)

Academic work
- Discipline: Sociology
- Sub-discipline: Ethical Consumerism, Corporate Social Responsibility, Social Movements
- Institutions: College of the Holy Cross, University of California, Davis
- Website: https://holycross.academia.edu/EllisJones

Ellis McNatt Jones (born February 25, 1970) is an American sociologist and author at College of the Holy Cross. His research has focused on ethical consumerism, corporate social responsibility, and lifestyle movements. He is best known for his research translating the social and environmental records of companies into an A to F rating system for use by consumers.

== Early life and education ==
Jones was a Peace Corps Volunteer in the Republic of Panama from 1993 to 1995 where he worked in Environmental Education. He holds a Ph.D. from the University of Colorado and is currently a professor of sociology at College of the Holy Cross.

== Work ==
Jones has researched consumer products, rating corporations on an "A" through "F" scale based on their scores in five areas: human rights (sweatshops, child labor, etc.), the environment (global warming, rainforest destruction, etc.), animal protection (animal testing, humane treatment, etc.), community involvement (local business support, nonprofit alliances, etc.), and social justice (fair wages, discrimination, etc.). In his book "The Better World Shopping Guide: Every Dollar Makes A Difference," he encourages consumers to push their dollars to the "A" and "B" companies and away from the "D" and "F" companies to create a better world.

== Selected bibliography ==
=== Books ===
- Jones, Ellis (2017). The Better World Shopping Guide: Every Dollar Makes A Difference (6th ed.). Vancouver, BC: New Society Publishers. ISBN 9780865718623.
- Jones, Ellis; Haenfler, Ross; Johnson, Brett (2007). The Better World Handbook: Small Changes That Make A Big Difference (2nd ed.). Vancouver, BC: New Society Publishers. ISBN 9780865715752.

=== Chapters in books ===
- Jones, Ellis (2018), "Brewing Green: Sustainability in the Craft Beer Movement", in Slocum, Susan L.; Kline, Carol; Cavaliere, Christina T. (eds.), Craft Beverages and Tourism, Volume 2: Environmental, Societal, and Marketing Implications, Palgrave Macmillan, pp. 9–26, ISBN 9783319571881
- Jones, Ellis; Harvey, Daina (2017), "Ethical Brews: New England, Networked Ecologies, and a New Craft Beer Movement", in Chapman, Nathaniel G.; Lellock, J. Slade; Lippard, Cameron D. (eds.), Untapped: Exploring the Cultural Dimensions of Craft Beer, Morgantown, WV: West Virginia University Press, pp. 124–136, ISBN 9781943665686
- Johnson, Brett; Haenfler, Ross; Jones, Ellis (2012), "Creating A More Just And Sustainable World", in Adler, Patricia; Adler, Peter (eds.), Sociological Odyssey: Contemporary Readings In Introductory Sociology (4th Edition), Wadsworth Cengage, ISBN 9781111829551

=== Articles ===
- Jones, Ellis (2017). "Bridging the Gap between Ethical Consumers and Corporate Social Responsibility: An International Comparison of Consumer-oriented CSR Rating Systems". Journal of Corporate Citizenship. 65 (2). Routledge: 30–55. doi:10.9774/GLEAF.4700.2017.ma.00005.
- Jones, Ellis (2015). "Don't Just Read Books, Write Them! Four Lessons Learned from a Multiyear Student-Authored Book Project in Social Theory". Humanity and Society. 39 (2). SAGE: 213–223. doi:10.1177/0160597615572849. S2CID 145748374.
- Haenfler, Ross; Johnson, Brett; Jones, Ellis (2012). "Lifestyle Movements: Exploring the Intersection of Lifestyle and Social Movements". Social Movement Studies. 11 (1). Taylor and Francis: 1–20. doi:10.1080/14742837.2012.640535. S2CID 143470534.
