= Vice presidency of JD Vance =

U.S. vice presidential tenure since 2025

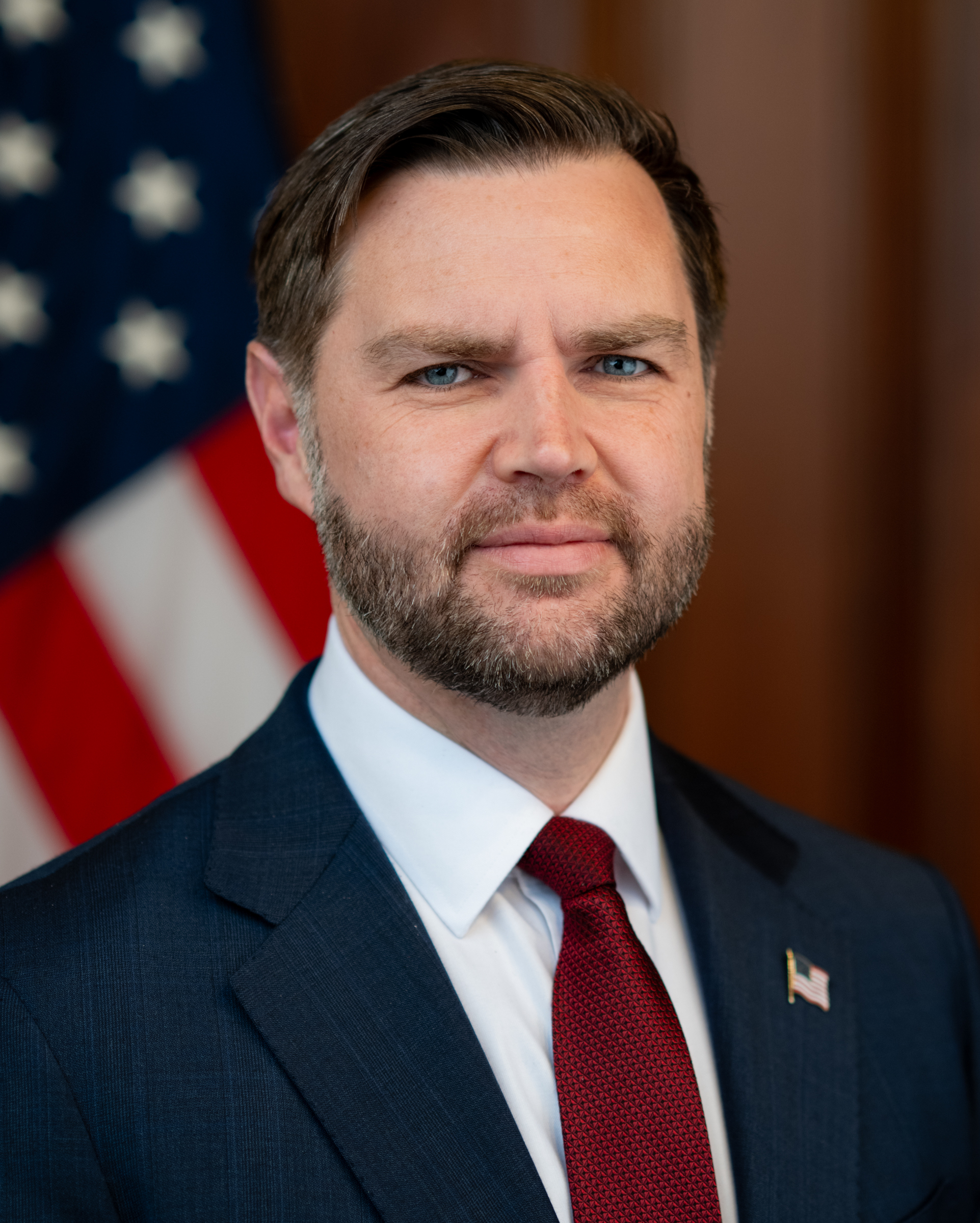
- Official portrait, 2026
- Vice presidency of JD Vance; January 20, 2025 – present
- President: Donald Trump
- Cabinet: See list
- Party: Republican
- Election: 2024
- Seat: Number One Observatory Circle
- Seal of the Vice President

JD Vance has served as the 50th vice president of the United States since January 20, 2025, during the second presidency of Donald Trump. Vance, a member of the Republican Party who had previously served as a U.S. senator representing Ohio from 2023 to 2025, was selected as Trump's running mate and took office following their victory in the 2024 presidential election over Democratic nominees Kamala Harris and Tim Walz. He is the first vice president to have served in the U.S. Marine Corps.

The first millennial to be vice president, Vance is the youngest person elected to the office since Richard Nixon in 1952, as well as the third-youngest vice president in U.S. history. He is the second Catholic to hold the position, after Joe Biden, and has the least previous political experience of any vice president, serving two years and seven days in office as a senator from Ohio before assuming the vice presidency. During his tenure, Vance has also served as the finance chair of the Republican National Committee.

Alongside Vance's vice presidency, the Republican Party also holds their majorities in the House of Representatives and the Senate during the 119th U.S. Congress following the 2024 elections, attains an overall federal government trifecta.

== 2024 vice-presidential campaign ==
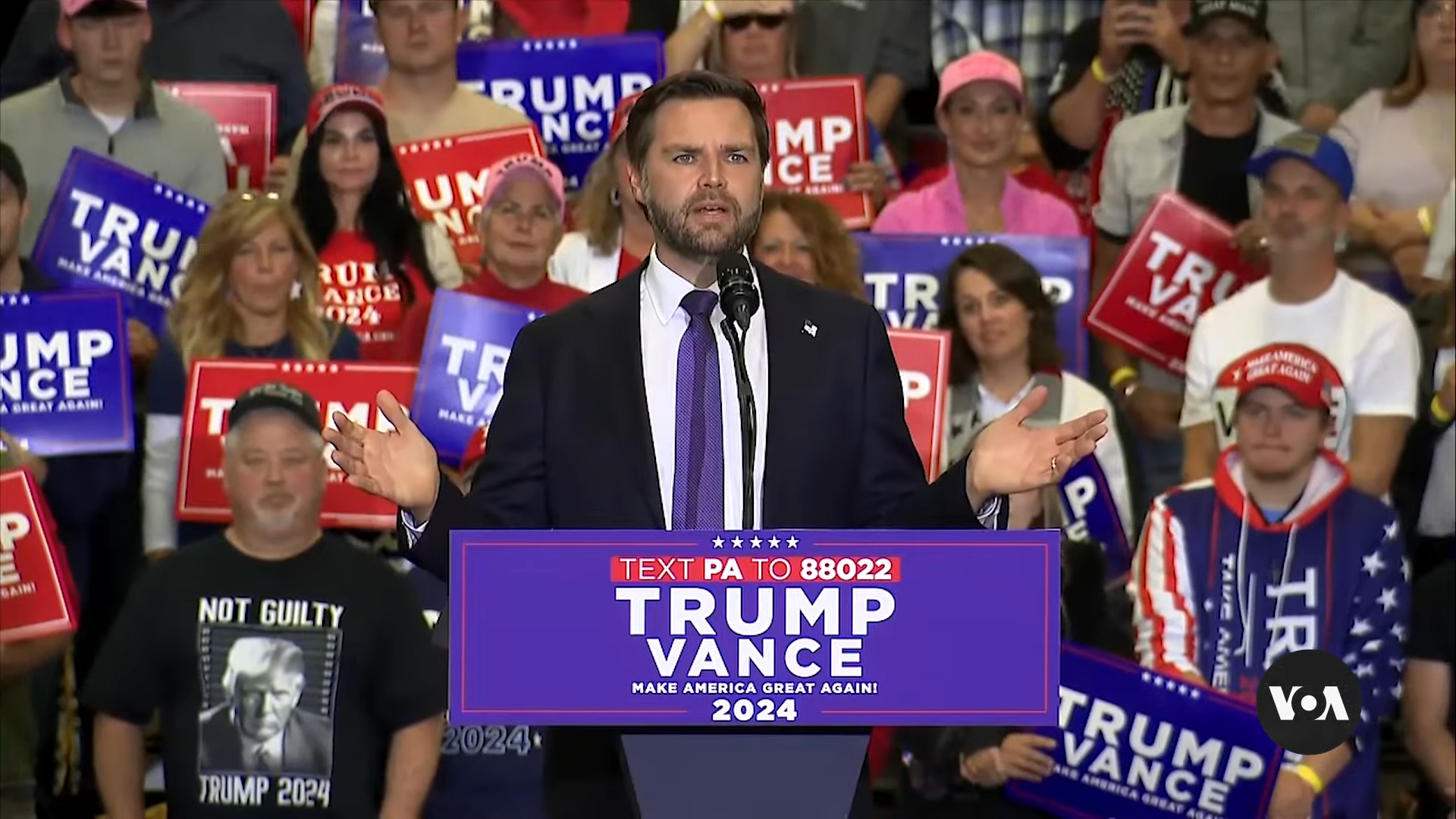
Vance speaking at a rally in Wilmington, North Carolina; October 2024

On January 31, 2023, Vance endorsed former president Donald Trump in the 2024 Republican Party presidential primaries. On July 15, 2024, the first day of the Republican National Convention, Trump announced on Truth Social that he had chosen Vance as his running mate. On July 17, Vance accepted the Republican nomination for vice president, at age 39.

Trump's two eldest sons, Donald Trump Jr. and Eric Trump, advocated for their father to choose Vance. Several media and industry figures are said to have lobbied for Vance to be on the presidential ticket, including Elon Musk, David O. Sacks, Tucker Carlson, and Peter Thiel, who first introduced Trump to Vance in 2021. The Heritage Foundation, which drafted Project 2025, privately advocated for Vance to be Trump's vice-presidential pick. Musk responded to Trump's vice-presidential pick hours after its announcement, saying the ticket "resounds with victory". David Sacks, a prominent GOP donor and Silicon Valley venture capitalist, wrote on Twitter: "This is who I want by Trump's side: an American patriot." In 2022, Sacks gave a super PAC supporting Vance's Senate campaign $900,000, and Peter Thiel added $15 million. It was initially reported that Elon Musk would contribute $45 million monthly to the Trump-Vance campaign, but Musk later said he planned to donate "much lower amounts".

On May 15, 2024, Trump attended a $50,000 per head private fundraising dinner with Vance in Cincinnati. Guests included Chris Bortz and Republican fundraiser Nate Morris. Vance appeared at significant conservative political events and in June was described as a potential running mate for Trump. In July, a former friend of Vance's from Yale Law School exposed to the media communications between them and Vance from 2014 to 2017, with the friend alleging that Vance has "changed [his] opinion on literally every imaginable issue that affects everyday Americans" in pursuit of "political power and wealth".

In late July 2024, after President Joe Biden withdrew his candidacy for reelection and Vice President Kamala Harris became a presidential candidate, Vance said at a private fundraiser that the "bad news is that Kamala Harris does not have the same baggage as Joe Biden ... Kamala Harris is obviously not struggling in the same ways that Joe Biden did"; a day later, Vance told the media: "I don't think the political calculus changes at all" whether Harris or Biden was the Democratic nominee. Following criticism of his past remarks and political positions, Vance said in an August 2024 interview that a vice president "doesn't really matter" and that "Kamala Harris has been a bad vice president". This came after Trump said that the "vice president, in terms of the election, does not have any impact". In late August, after the Trump campaign was embroiled in controversy for allegedly bringing cameras into a restricted area of Arlington National Cemetery during Trump's visit there, Vance first said that Harris "can go to hell" because "she wants to yell at Donald Trump because he showed up", and then said "Don't do this fake outrage thing". At the time of his comments, Harris had not publicly discussed the incident.

In August 2024, Vance said that Trump "said that explicitly that he would" veto a national abortion ban. In September 2024, during his debate with Harris, Trump was asked about Vance's statement about the veto, and responded: "I didn't discuss it with JD ... I think he was speaking for me—but I really didn't."

In late September 2024, Vance spoke at a western Pennsylvania town hall event organized by Lance Wallnau, who has promoted election denialism and called Kamala Harris a "demon". In October 2024, Vance said he did not believe Trump lost the 2020 presidential election and that he believed "Big Tech rigged the election" through censorship.

=== Comments on childlessness ===
Shortly after being named Trump's running mate, Vance was criticized for saying in a 2021 Fox News interview, "we are effectively run in this country via the Democrats, via our corporate oligarchs, by a bunch of childless cat ladies who are miserable at their own lives and the choices that they've made and so they want to make the rest of the country miserable too." The resurfaced comments, which were posted by MeidasTouch editor-in-chief Ron Filipkowski, sparked an immediate backlash across news and social media. On July 26, 2024, Vance clarified his remarks on The Megyn Kelly Show, saying, "It's not a criticism of people who don't have children" and "this is about criticizing the Democratic Party for becoming anti-family and anti-child". He has said that being "pro-babies and pro-family" should be the Republican Party's highest priority.

After backlash to the Fox News interview, additional comments that Vance had made in interviews about childless people resurfaced. In a 2020 podcast interview, he said that being childless "makes people more sociopathic and ultimately our whole country a little bit less, less mentally stable". Vance's campaign referred to "radical childless leaders in this country" in a fundraising email sent after his appearance on Tucker Carlson Tonight. CNN found multiple examples of Vance making similarly disparaging remarks about childless people, primarily Democratic officials. In a 2021 speech at a Center for Christian Virtue leadership meeting, Vance said that childless teachers were "trying to brainwash the minds of our children" and criticized American Federation of Teachers President Randi Weingarten, saying: "If she wants to brainwash and destroy the minds of children, she should have some of her own and leave ours the hell alone." He also suggested in a March 2021 interview on The Charlie Kirk Show that childless people should be taxed at a higher rate than those with children, adding that the U.S. should "reward the things that we think are good" and "punish the things that we think are bad". In an August 2024 interview on Face the Nation, Vance said he supported increasing the child tax credit from $2,000 per child to $5,000 per child, even though his Senate Republican colleagues had blocked an expanded child tax credit two weeks earlier while he was absent for the vote, having called it a "show vote" and saying it would not have passed even if he had been present.

=== Comments on Haitian immigrants ===
In September 2024, Vance made allegations of "Haitian illegal immigrants draining social services and generally causing chaos all over Springfield, Ohio. Reports now show that people have had their pets abducted and eaten by people who shouldn't be in this country". Trump subsequently echoed the allegations, including during a presidential debate. Springfield authorities said there were "no credible reports or specific claims" of such incidents and that "Haitian immigrants are here legally". Vance then said that it was "possible, of course, that all of these rumors will turn out to be false", but also told his supporters to "keep the cat memes flowing". He then promoted conservative activist Christopher Rufo's allegation that African migrants were eating cats in Dayton, Ohio; Dayton authorities reported "no evidence to even remotely suggest that any group, including our immigrant community, is engaged in eating pets".

After Vance's claim about Haitians eating pets was disputed, he said: "Do you know what's confirmed? That a child was murdered by a Haitian migrant who had no right to be here"; the child had actually died in an accidental collision between vehicles in Springfield, and the child's father criticized Vance for using the child's "death for political gain". Vance also alleged a "massive rise in communicable diseases" in Springfield, but Clark County's health commissioner reported having "not seen a substantial increase in all reportable communicable diseases". After Vance's and Trump's allegations, Springfield experienced multiple bomb threats in September. Vance denounced "violence or the threat of violence levied against Springfield", but continued his allegations against immigrants there. He defended his claims about Haitian migrants eating cats, saying that he was willing "to create stories so that the American media actually pays attention ... we're creating a story, meaning we're creating the American media focusing on it."

=== Vice presidential debate ===
The vice presidential debate was held on Tuesday, October 1, 2024, at 9:00 p.m. EDT at the CBS Broadcast Center in New York City.

CBS stated in late September that the moderators would not fact-check the candidates during the debate, with fact-checking instead handled online and on-air only after the debate. When Vance was fact checked on the status of Haitian immigrants in Springfield, Ohio, he objected saying, "The rules were that you were not going to fact check", and argued that the immigrants should not be considered legal because the federal government decided their protected status after they had arrived in the United States. Walz rejected Vance's argument, and the microphones were muted as Vance continued speaking.

Nielsen Media Research reported that 43 million viewers across CBS and 15 other television networks watched the debate, down from 57 million viewers during the 2020 vice presidential debate.

=== Opinion polls ===
In July 2024, a CNN poll analysis after the Republican National Convention showed a net-negative approval rating for Vance. That week, Vance's middling public reception and other concerns led some prominent Republican politicians and political analysts to say that he may have been a poor choice of running mate, especially in light of the shift in the election's dynamics upon the withdrawal of President Biden from the election and advent of Kamala Harris as the Democratic nominee.

After the October 2024 vice-presidential debate, A CBS News/YouGov poll of 1,630 likely debate viewers found Vance's favorability rose from 40% to 49%, while Walz's increased from 52% to 60%. Both candidates' unfavorability ratings also declined, with Vance's dropping from 54% to 47% and Walz's falling from 41% to 35%. The poll had a margin of error of 2.7 points.

As of February 20, 2025, according to FiveThirtyEight, Vance's overall favorability was 40.7% and his unfavorability was 42.5%.

== Transition and inauguration ==
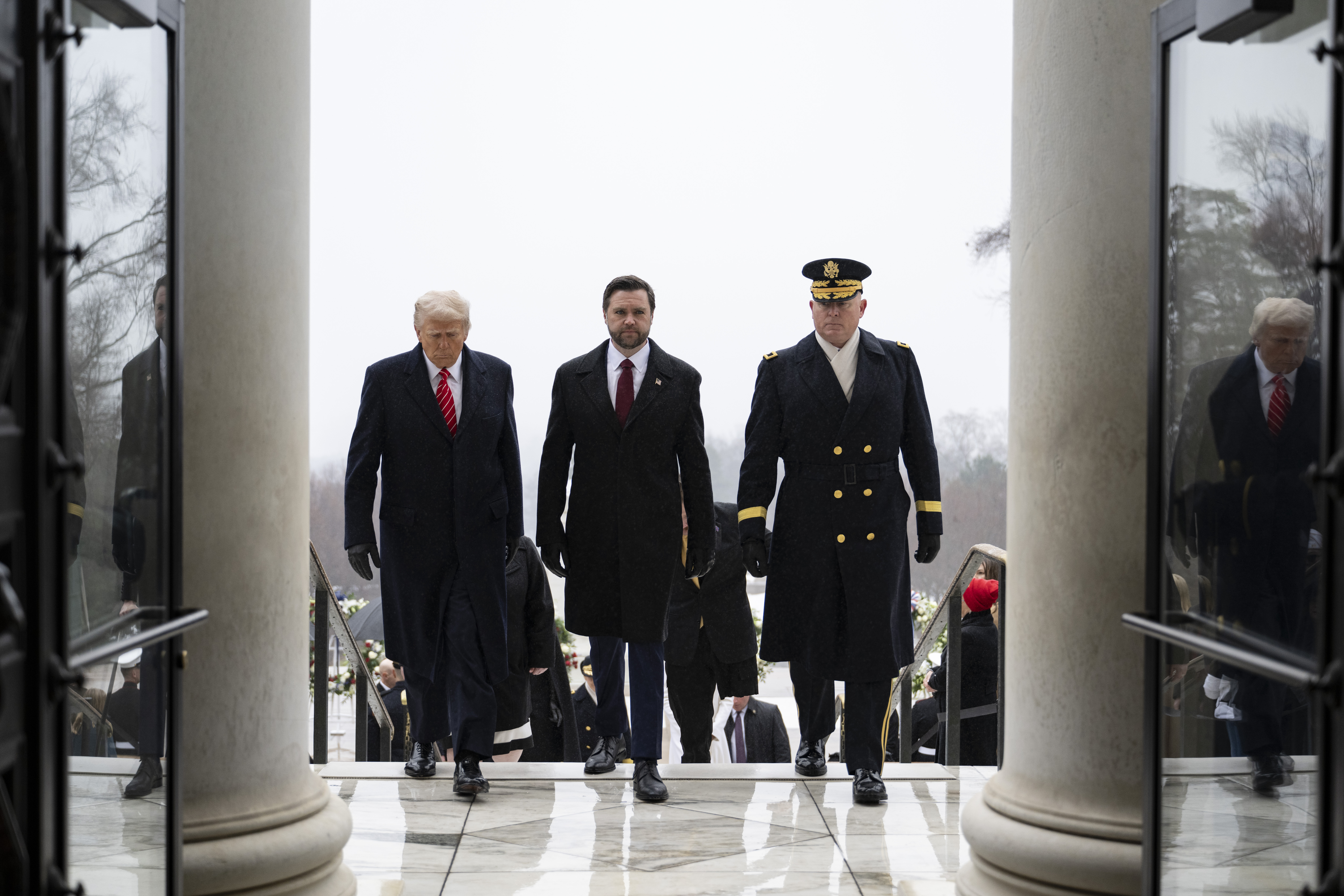
President-elect Donald Trump, Vice President-elect Vance, and Major general Bredenkamp in Arlington, Virginia, January 19, 2025

The transition period began following Vance's victory in the election. Vance, along with Donald Trump Jr., Eric Trump, Tulsi Gabbard, and Robert F. Kennedy Jr. were designated as honorary co-chairs of the second presidential transition of Donald Trump.

On December 5, Vance and his wife traveled to Western North Carolina to survey storm wreckage from Hurricane Helene and to thank first responders, alongside U.S. senators Thom Tillis and Shelley Moore Capito.

On December 7, Vance met with UK Leader of the Opposition Kemi Badenoch in Washington, D.C., to discuss US–UK relations.

On December 12, Vance appeared alongside Trump, Melania Trump, Ivanka Trump, and others to ring the opening bell at the New York Stock Exchange.

On December 14, 2024, Vance attended the 2024 Army–Navy Game, alongside Trump, Elon Musk, Daniel Penny, Pete Hegseth, and Ron DeSantis.

Vance and his family spent New Year's Eve at Mar-a-Lago, alongside the Trump family, Elon Musk, Senator Ted Cruz, Congressman Michael Waltz, Alina Habba, Don King, Roger Stone, and Miriam Adelson.

On January 3, 2025, Vance attended the swearing-in ceremony of Bernie Moreno and Dave McCormick.

On January 9, Vance attended the funeral of Jimmy Carter, alongside the current and living former vice presidents.

On January 19, Vance and Trump attended a wreath laying ceremony at the Tomb of the Unknown Soldier at Arlington National Cemetery.

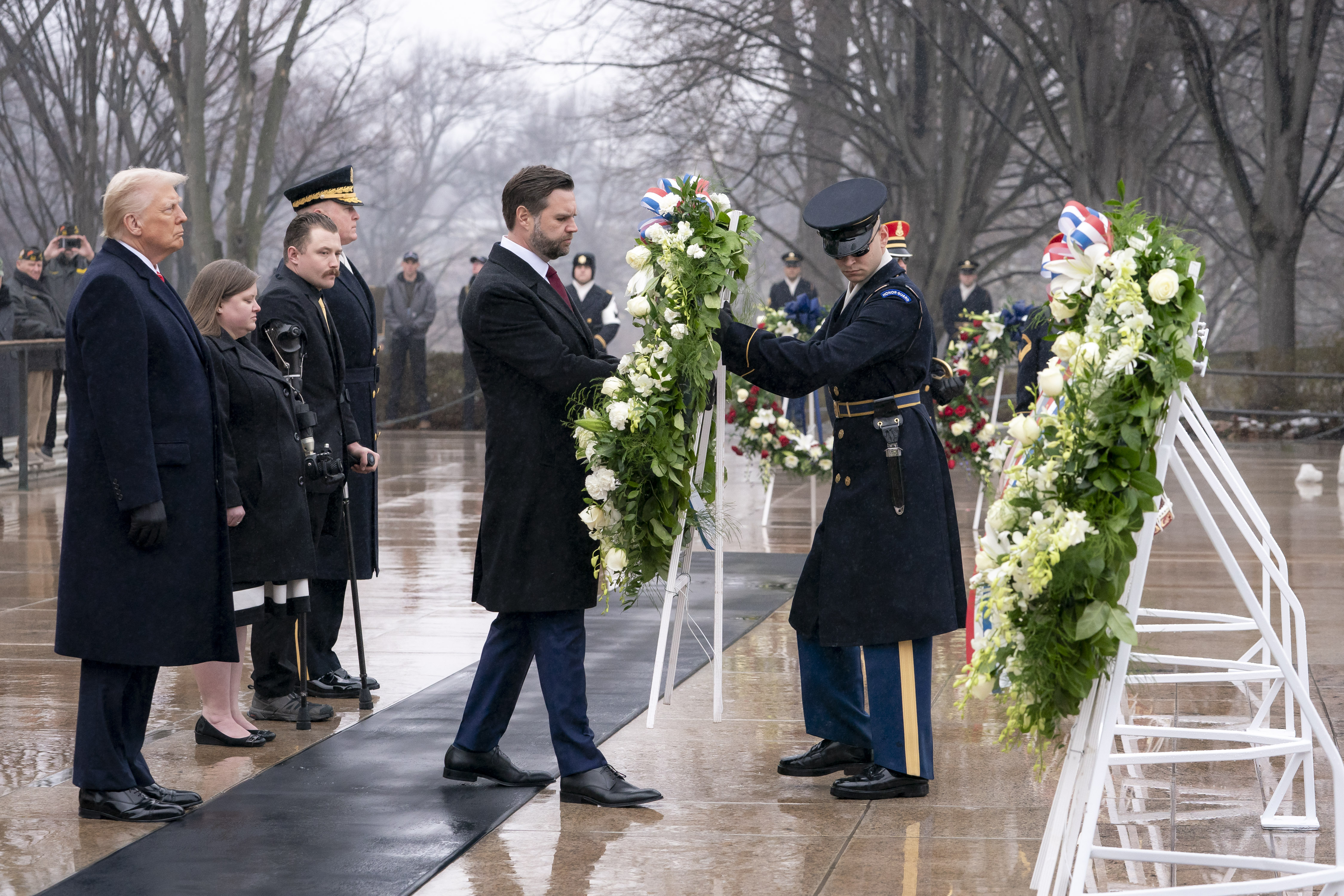
Vance participating in a wreath laying ceremony at Tomb of the Unknown Soldier at Arlington National Cemetery, January 19, 2025

On the morning of his inauguration, Vance held a meeting with China's vice president Han Zheng in which they discussed China–United States relations.

On January 20, 2025, Vance was inaugurated as the 50th vice president of the United States. Later that night, he attended multiple inaugural balls in Washington, DC.

=== December 2024 continuing resolution ===
On December 17, 2024, leadership from the two parties reached an agreement on further short-term government expenditures, unveiling a bill that would have extended the previous continuing resolution's deadline to March 14, 2025, while also funding and renewing several federal programs.

On December 18, President-elect Donald Trump and Vice President-elect JD Vance issued a joint statement demanding the removal of additional spending (except for disaster relief and aid to farmers) and the suspension of the debt ceiling (due to be reached in 2025).

Republicans quickly remodeled the bill to that effect and put it up for a vote, but not to avail: the House rejected the proposal by a vote of 174 to 235, with all but three Democrats joining 38 conservative Republicans, in voting against it. Democratic Leader Hakeem Jeffries criticized Republicans for abandoning the bipartisan deal at the very last moment. At the same time, conservative Republicans lamented the presence of new spending and the rise in the debt ceiling.

One day after the rejection of the second bill, Republicans released a third remodeled bill essentially the same as the second but without the suspension of the debt ceiling as proposed by Trump and Vance. Republicans also announced that has reached a handshake agreement with President-elect Trump to cut $2.5 trillion in government spending in exchange for a $1.5 trillion debt ceiling hike. The agreement was not part of the third proposal and was not voted on by the House.

The bill was passed in a 366–34 vote, with one member voting present. All but one Democrat voted for the bill, while 34 Republicans voted against it.

== Vice presidency (2025–present) ==
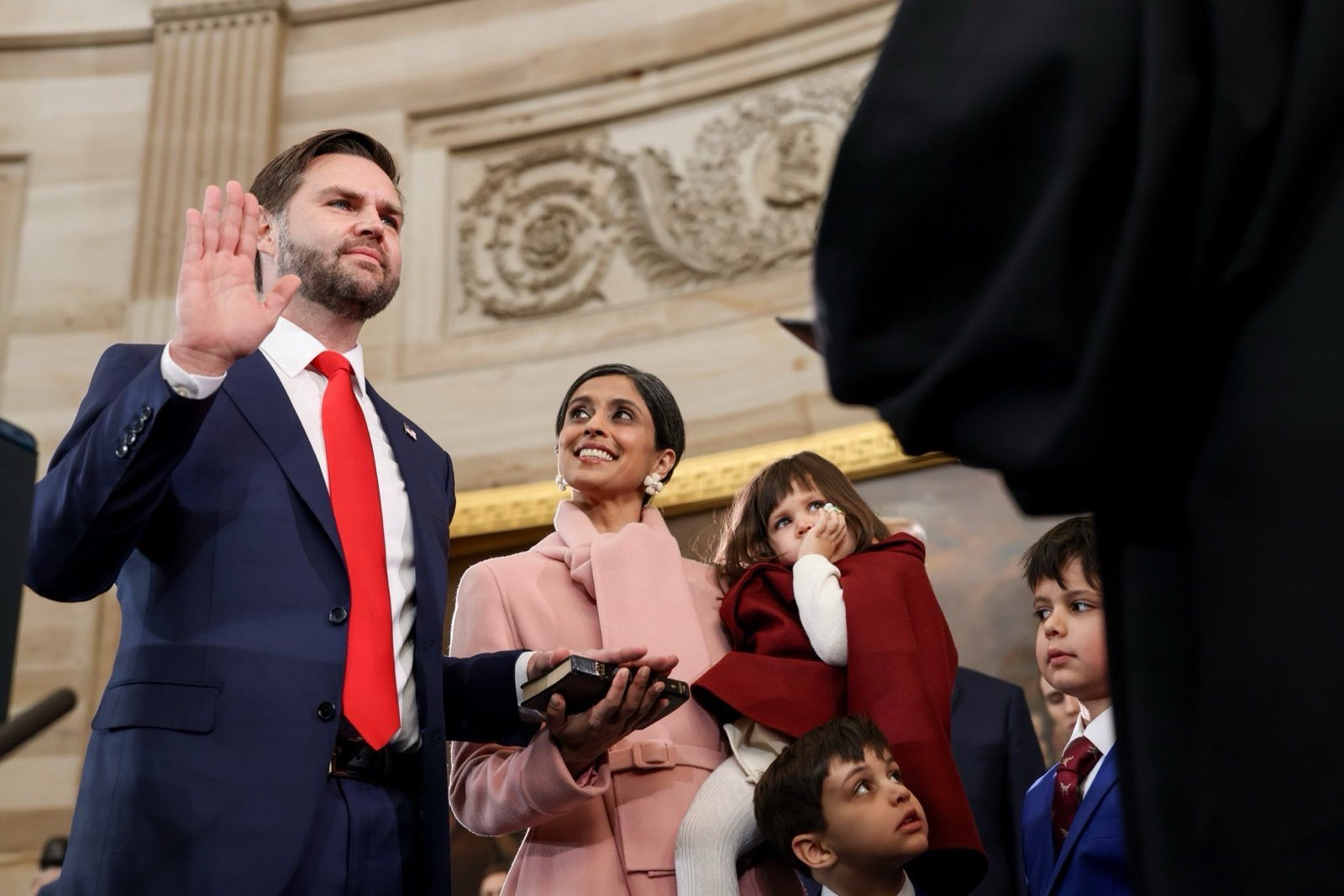
Vance being sworn in as vice president by Supreme Court Justice Brett Kavanaugh on January 20, 2025

At noon on January 20, 2025, Vance became the 50th vice president of the United States, sworn into the office by Justice Brett Kavanaugh. Before his inauguration, he held a meeting with China's vice president Han Zheng in which they discussed China–United States relations. Vance is the third-youngest person to serve as vice president, the second Catholic vice president after Joe Biden, and the first from the Millennial generation. He is also the first Marine Corps veteran and the first former U.S. senator from Ohio to serve as vice president. Vance is the first former senior U.S. senator to serve as vice president since Joe Biden and the second since Walter Mondale. Political observers have expected Vance to be the second-most powerful vice president in U.S. history, after Dick Cheney.

On January 21, among Vance's first acts as vice president was swearing in Marco Rubio, the first Hispanic American Secretary of State and the first of Trump's cabinet nominees to be approved by Congress.

On January 24, Vance spoke to the crowd of the 2025 March for Life, saying: "I want more babies in the United States of America." That same day, he swore in John Ratcliffe as Director of the CIA, the second of Trump's cabinet nominees to be confirmed by the Senate. That evening, he cast the tie-breaking vote to confirm Pete Hegseth as Secretary of Defense.

On January 25, Vance swore in Hegseth as the 29th secretary of defense. Later that same day, Vance was set to swear in Kristi Noem as Secretary of Homeland Security at the Eisenhower Executive Office Building, however, Noem was delayed due to a complication in the arrival of her late father's Bible. After waiting for over half an hour, Vance left the building to maintain his schedule.

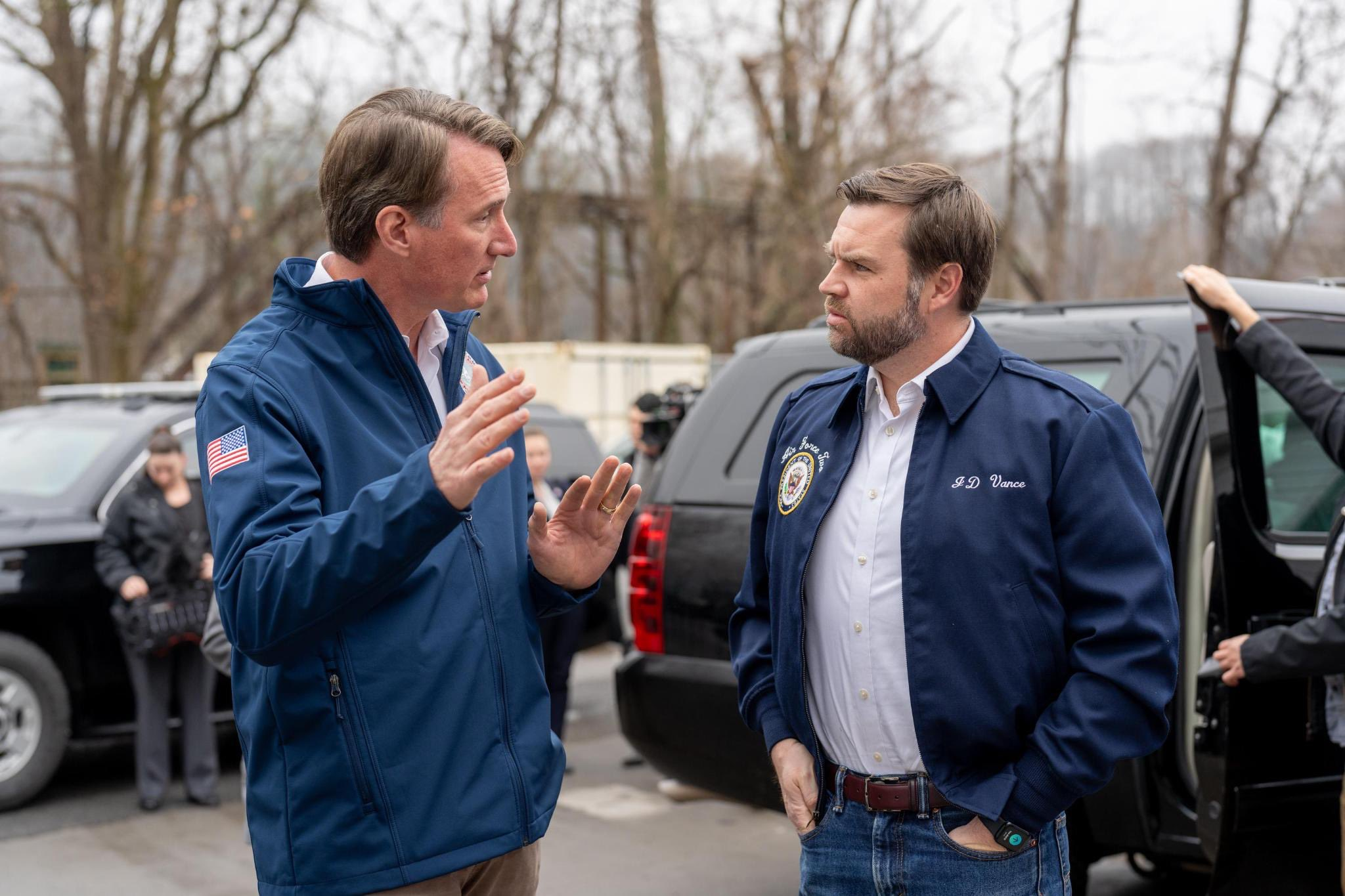
Vance with Governor Glenn Youngkin, January 28, 2025

On January 28, Vance traveled aboard Air Force Two to Washington County, Virginia to meet with Hurricane Helene survivors alongside Governor Glenn Youngkin.

In February 2025, after multiple federal judges issued temporary rulings against various Trump administration actions, Vance wrote, "judges aren't allowed to control the executive's legitimate power".

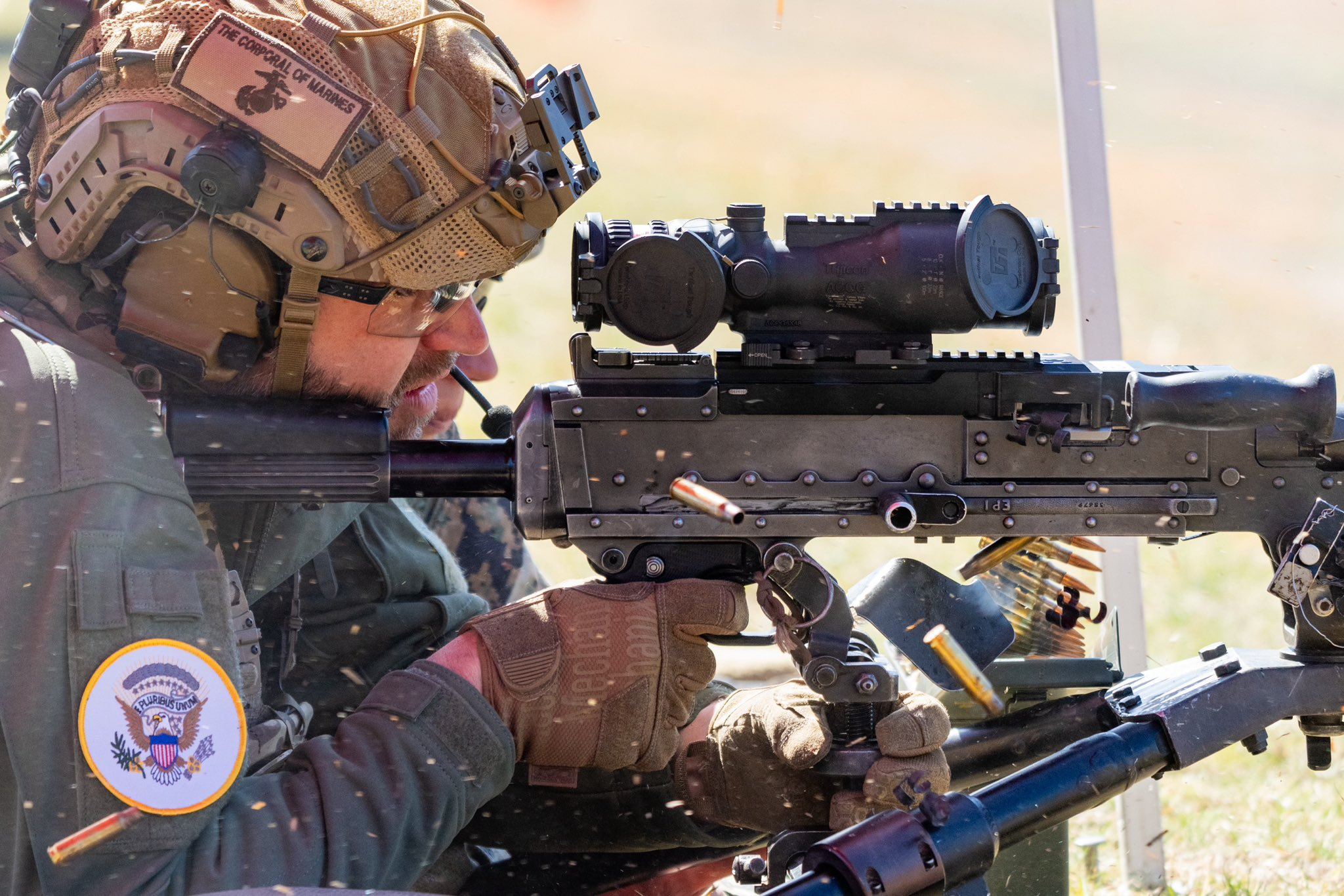
Vance shooting an M240 machine gun at Marine Corps Base Quantico, wearing a helmet patch with "The Corporal of Marines" title, March 2025

On March 26, Vance visited Marine Corps Base Quantico to commemorate the then-upcoming 250th anniversary of the founding of the U.S. Marine Corps. At the event, Vance spoke to Marines about the history of the Marine Corps, saying: "Two-hundred-fifty years of winning wars, 250 years of kicking ass and taking names". He also participated in shooting a M27 Infantry automatic rifle, M240 machine gun, M107 .50 caliber rifle, and M102 howitzer at the base firing range. While visiting the base, Vance wore a helmet patch inscribed with "The Corporal of Marines" where the title "commander-in-chief" would appear on the U.S. president's patch.

In March 2025, Vance became the first sitting U.S. vice president to visit Greenland, appearing at the United States' Pituffik Space Base. Vance acknowledged that Trump wanted the United States to acquire Greenland, commenting: "We can't just ignore the president's desires", while warning that Greenland faced the "encroachment of powerful countries" China and Russia "as they expand their ambitions". Vance explicitly declared in a "message to Denmark" that "you have not done a good job", as Vance criticized Denmark for having "underinvested in the security architecture" and "people of Greenland".

In August 2025, Vance was criticized for a family kayaking trip. At the request of the U.S. Secret Service, water levels on the Little Miami River were adjusted and the outflow of Caesar Creek Lake was increased by the U.S. Army Corps of Engineers.

On January 3, 2026, a 26-year-old man from Crestview Hills, Kentucky, was arrested and federally charged with breaking windows and attempting to enter Vance's East Walnut Hills home in Cincinnati, Ohio. The man, who lived then in neighboring Hyde Park, was armed with a hammer and reportedly vandalized a Secret Service vehicle as well. Vance was not in Ohio at the time.

On April 3, 2026, Trump announced on Truth Social that Vance would be tasked with investigating fraud, particularly in 'Blue States', as 'fraud czar'.

On April 25, 2026, Vance was present during the White House Correspondents' Dinner shooting at the Washington Hilton hotel. He was escorted out, uninjured.

=== Munich Security Conference ===
JD Vance's speech at the 61st Munich Security Conference

In his February 2025 speech at the Munich Security Conference (MSC), citing in part what he said were examples in Romania, England, Scotland, and Germany, Vance called "the threat from within" his biggest concern in terms of security for Europe, "not Russia, not China".

Several media outlets regarded the speech as a turning point in European Union–United States relations along with United States President Donald Trump's telephone conversation with President of Russia Vladimir Putin. Some described it as a declaration of "ideological war" and "culture war" against the United States' European allies, and a "wrecking ball" to the decades-long status quo of transatlantic relations.

=== Zelenskyy White House visit ===
On February 28, 2025, Vance and Trump met the Ukrainian President Volodymyr Zelenskyy in the White House's Oval Office in front of journalists in an internationally broadcast event. During the meeting, Vance was mostly quiet during the first 40 minutes, but then interjected to answer a question about Trump's relationship with Russian President Vladimir Putin. Vance told Zelenskyy: "The path to peace and the path to prosperity is maybe engaging in diplomacy ... What makes America a good country is America engaging in diplomacy. That's what President Trump is doing." Zelenskyy responded that Putin had not abided by a ceasefire and prisoner exchange agreement with Ukraine, and asked Vance, "What kind of diplomacy, J.D., you are speaking about?"

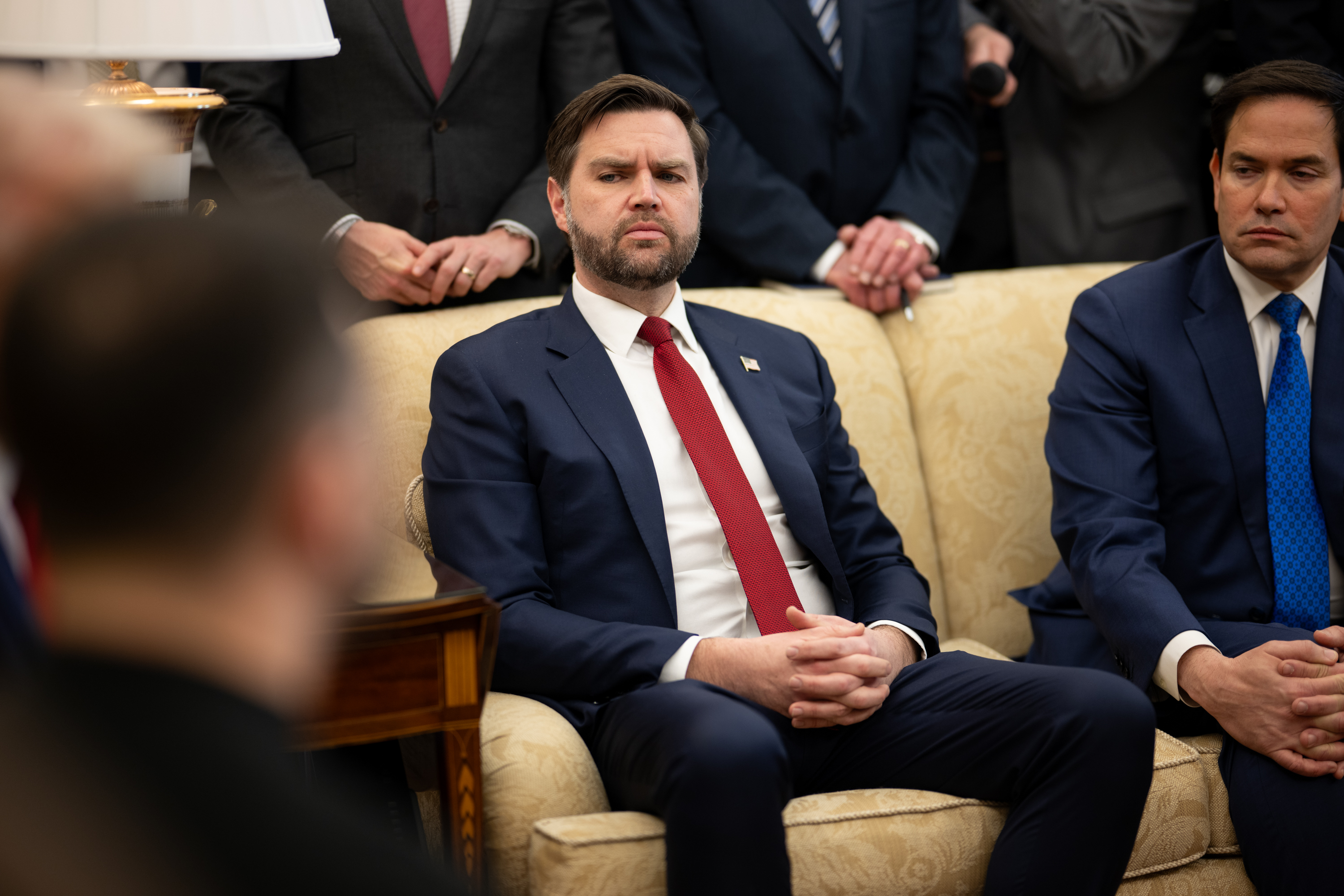
Vance sitting next to Secretary of State Marco Rubio during the meeting

The conversation became hostile; Vance replied that he was discussing "diplomacy that's going to end the destruction of" Ukraine, telling Zeleknskyy: "it's disrespectful for you to come to the Oval Office and try to litigate this in front of the American media ... you guys are going around and forcing conscripts to the front lines because you have manpower problems. You should be thanking the president for trying to bring an end to this conflict". Zelenskyy asked whether Vance had ever visited Ukraine; Vance replied that had "watched and seen the stories" about Ukraine, accusing Zelenskyy of showing a "propaganda tour" of Ukraine. He asked whether Zelenskyy had ever offered thanks, despite Zelenskyy starting the conversation by saying "Thank you so much" to Trump. Vance falsely said Zelenskyy "went to Pennsylvania and campaigned for the opposition in October" 2024; Zelenskyy had actually visited a factory to thank workers producing ammunition for Ukraine, though the timing of the visit and separately calling Vance "too radical" raised suspicion among Republicans. After the meeting, Zelenskyy and his delegation were made to leave the White House, canceling the original plan to sign a minerals deal between Ukraine and the U.S.

=== Iran War ceasefire talks ===
In what was considered to be his "toughest" task to date as vice president, Vance led the delegation of the United States during the Islamabad Talks on 11 and 12 April 2026 with the hopes of obtaining a ceasefire agreement for the ongoing 2026 Iran War. However, after negotiating for 21 hours, both sides failed to come to any new form of agreement.

== Domestic policy ==
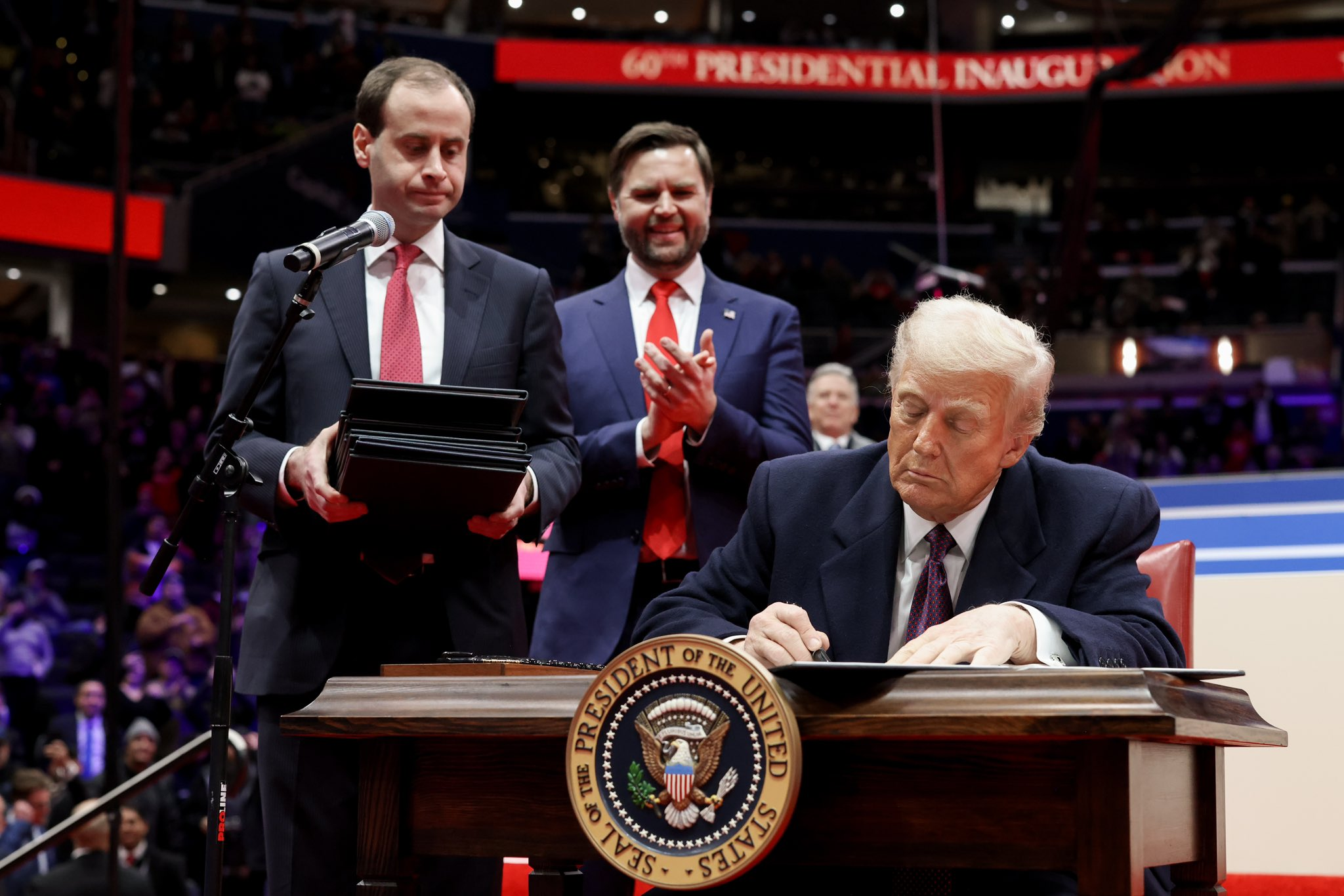
Trump signing executive orders on January 20, 2025, his first day in office, at Capital One Arena

=== Rhetorical Style ===
Vance's speeches during his term as VP have largely followed the theme of the administration's populist core messaging, however he's also shown awareness of deeper concepts of political theory such as the overton window several times. Vance's speech on economics at the American Compass 5th anniversary gala, a conservative think tank, is one example of statements made by the VP where he has shown a deep grasp of one particular issue beyond the populist messaging commonly used by President Trump.

=== Abortion ===
During the 2024 United States vice presidential debate, Vance declared that abortion should be delegated to states. He was previously in-favor of a nationwide abortion ban; however, he later stated that he "never supported a national ban". Vance has supported Trump's decision to veto a potential federal abortion ban.

=== Climate and environment ===
On his first day in office, Vance stood beside Trump when he signed Executive Order 14162; withdrawing the U.S. from the Paris Agreement. He supported Trump's pause on disbursement of climate-related funds issued by the IRA and BIL.

=== Economy ===
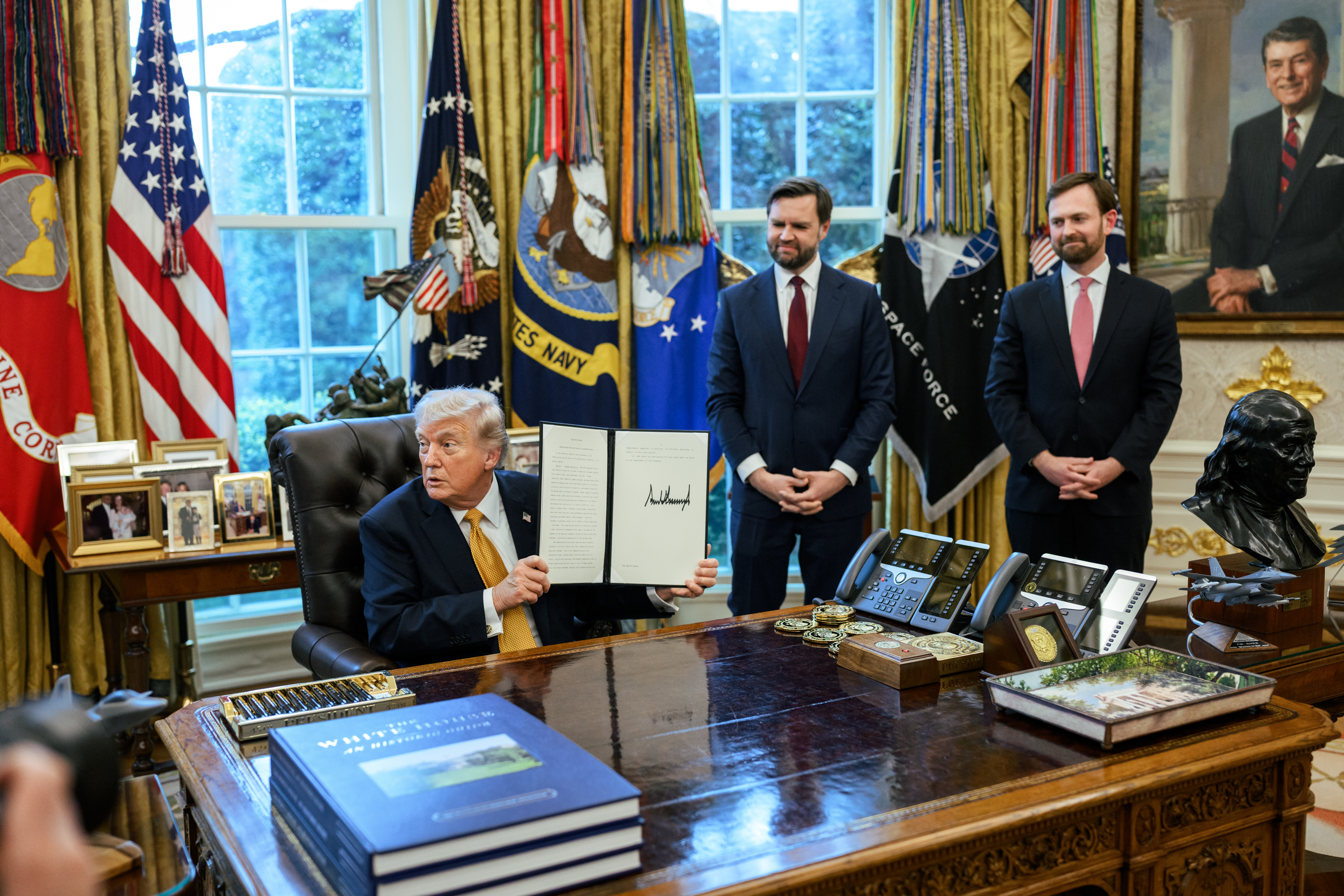
Trump signing an executive order creating the White House Task Force to Eliminate Fraud led by Vance on March 16, 2026

Vance's economic views have been described as "economic populism" and sometimes "economic nationalism".

During their 2024 campaign, Trump and Vance promised to impose higher tariffs on imports from all countries, particularly China.

On February 1, 2025, Trump and Vance followed through on their intentions and imposed a 25% tariff on all goods from Mexico and Canada and a 10% tariff on China. A lower 10% tariff was announced for all energy exports from Canada, including electricity, natural gas, and oil. Trump's trade advisor, Peter Navarro, stated that the lower rate for energy was intended to "minimize any disruptive effects". The tariffs are due to come into effect on February 4. In response, representatives from Mexico and Canada announced intentions to impose retaliatory tariffs on the United States. The orders signed by Trump reportedly include a clause allowing for an increase in tariff rates if such retaliatory tariffs are implemented.

=== Immigration and border security ===
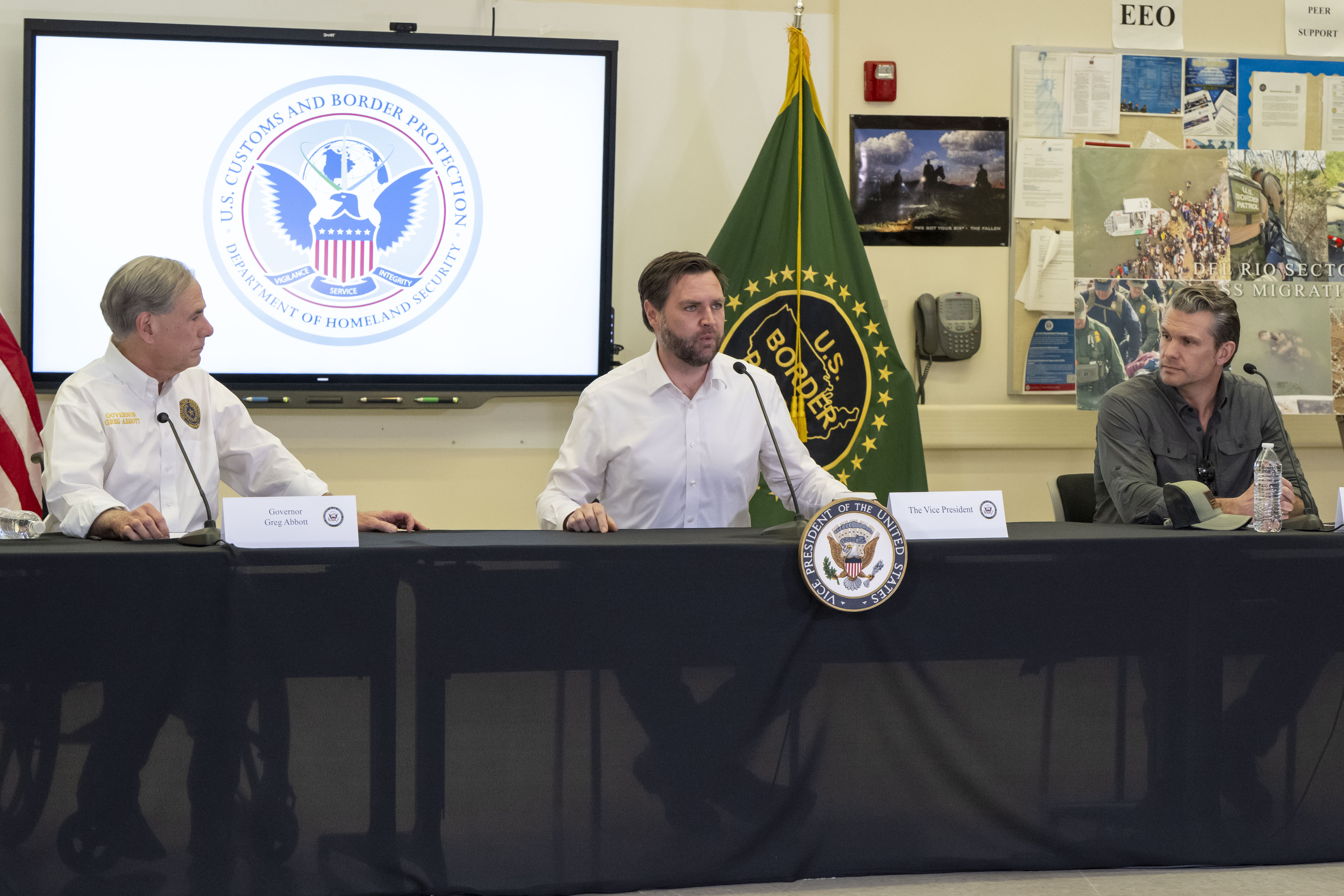
Vance with Texas governor Greg Abbott and Secretary Pete Hegseth speaking to the press about the border crisis in Eagle Pass, Texas, 2025

Vance has supported Trump's proposal for a wall along the southern border and rejected the idea that supporters of the wall are racist. He has proposed spending $3 billion to finish the wall.

Vance co-sponsored the Laken Riley Act, signed into law by Trump on January 29, 2025, the first legislation of Vance's term.

=== Benefits fraud ===
Task Force to Eliminate Fraud

Task Force Overview
- Formed: March 16, 2026
- Type: Federal Interagency Task Force
- Jurisdiction: United States Federal Government
- Headquarters: Eisenhower Executive Office Building, Washington, D.C.
- Status: Active

Leadership & Core Operations
- Chair: JD Vance (Vice President of the United States)
- Vice Chair: Andrew Ferguson (FTC Chairman)
- Enforcement Arm: National Fraud Enforcement Division (DOJ) Led by Assistant AG Colin M. McDonald

Impact & Metrics (2026)
- Fraud Uncovered: ~$230 billion
- Payments Stopped: ~$56 billion
- ACA Reclaim: $2.2 billion savings (760,000 fraudulent accounts removed)
- Loan Suspensions: ~870,000 individuals barred (COVID-era program fraud)

Official Resources
- Website: fraud.gov

== Foreign policy ==
=== Asia ===
==== China ====
Vance shaking hands with Chinese leader Xi Jinping during his state visit to the United States, September 2026

Just before Trump's second inauguration, Vice President Vance and Elon Musk each held separate meetings with China's vice president Han Zheng, who was in Washington attending the event as China's paramount leader Xi Jinping's special representative. Han's presence at the event was seen by commentators as representative of Xi's interest in strengthening China–United States relations under Trump's tenure.

Vance in April 2025 criticized the "globalist economy" for causing the United States to "borrow money from Chinese peasants to buy the things those Chinese peasants manufacture"; this comment sparked condemnation from the Chinese government and the Chinese Internet sphere.

==== India ====
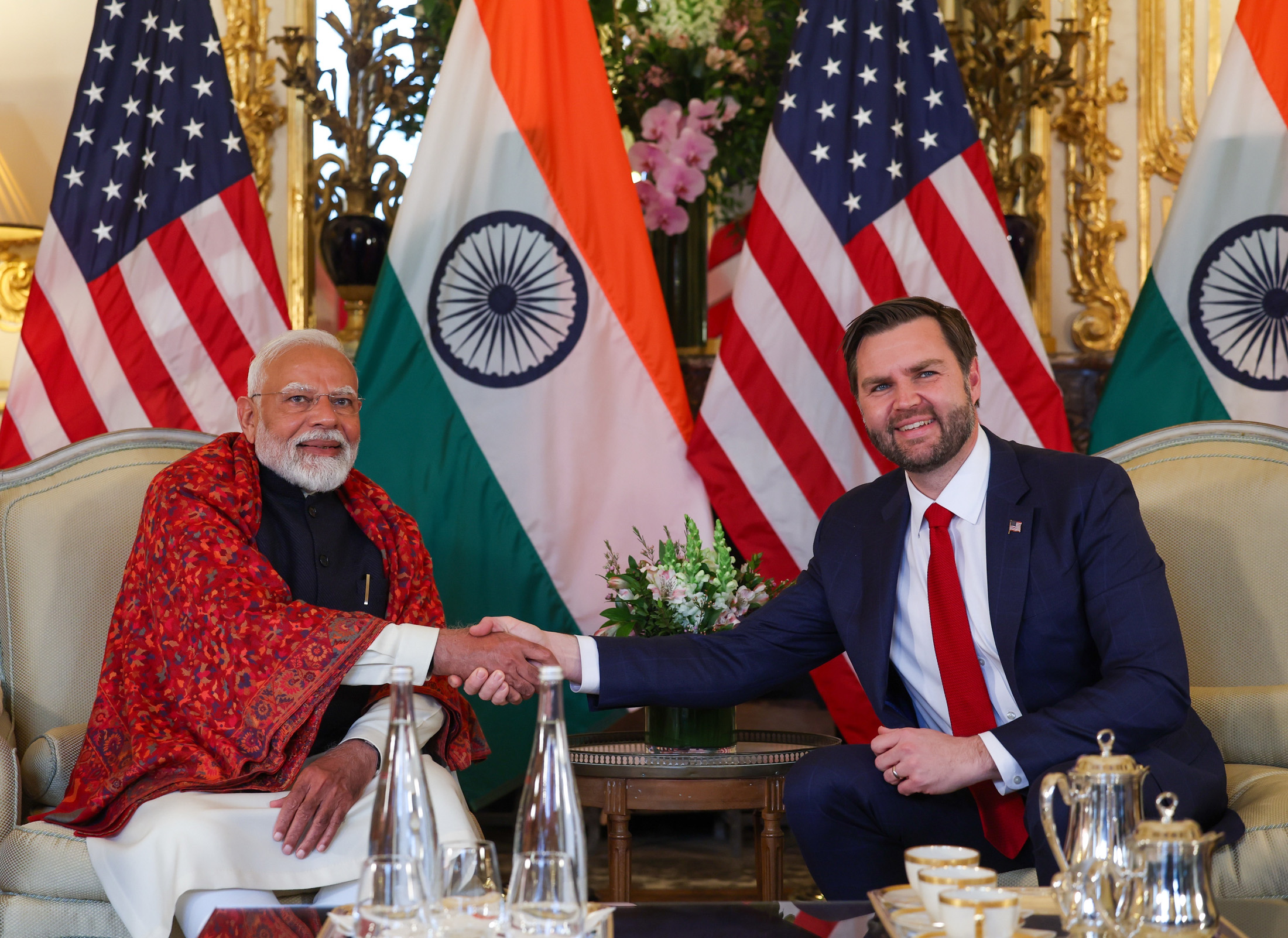
Vance with Prime Minister Narendra Modi in Paris, France, February 2025

On February 11, 2025, Vance met with Indian prime minister Narendra Modi in Paris, France to discuss the diversification of the Indian energy sector through investments in U.S. nuclear technology.

In his second official foreign trip as vice president, Vance travelled to India, alongside his Indian-origin wife, Usha.

==== Israel ====
In an October 2024 interview, Vance said: "Israel has the right to defend itself, but America's interest is sometimes going to be distinct. Sometimes we're going to have overlapping interests and sometimes we're going to have distinct interests. And our interest, I think, very much is in not going to war with Iran."

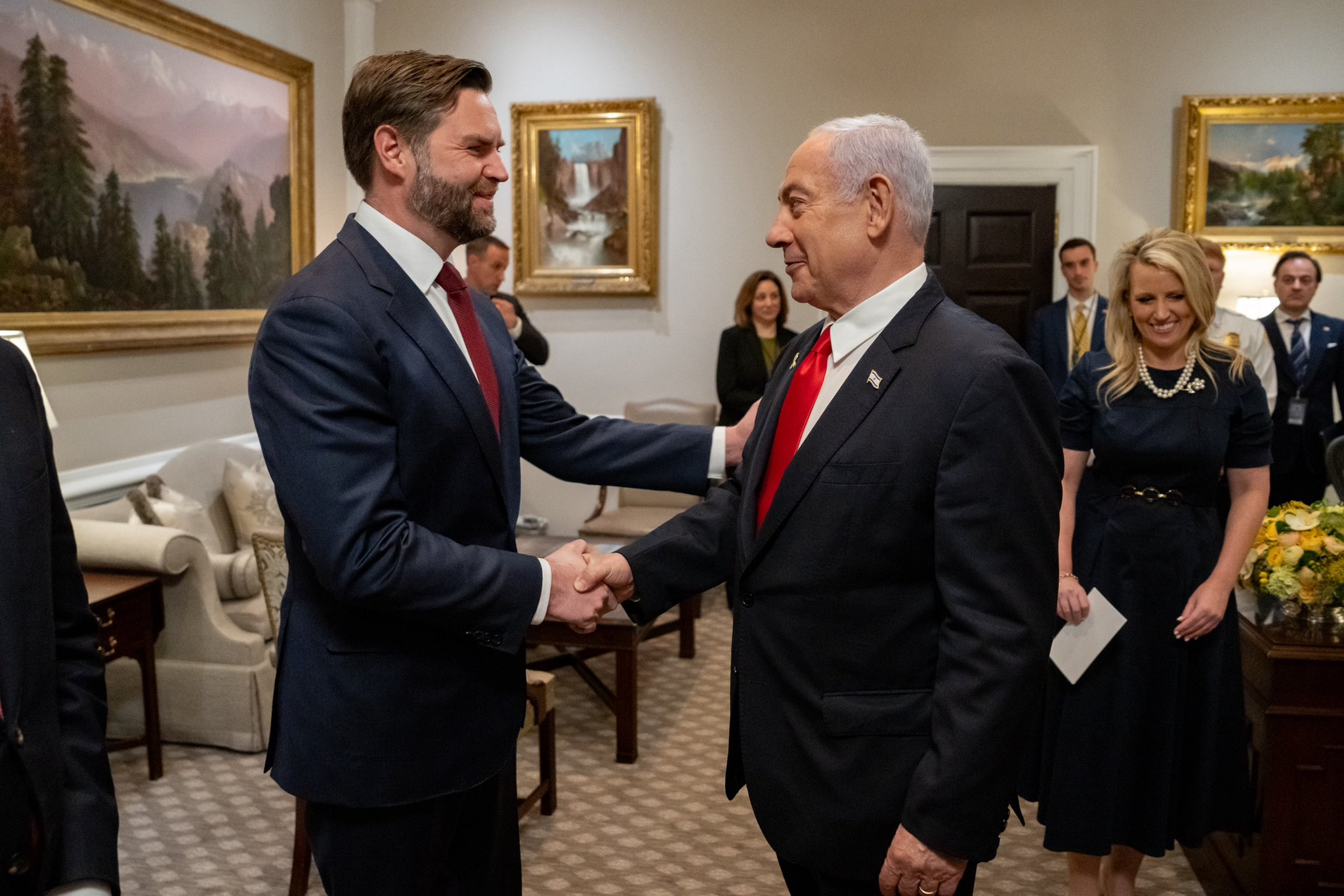
Vance with Prime Minister Benjamin Netanyahu, April 2025

In February 2025, Israeli prime minister Benjamin Netanyahu visited the United States and met with Vance and Mike Waltz in the Blair House to discuss US–Israeli relations and the ongoing Middle Eastern crisis.

In April 2025, Prime Minister Benjamin Netanyahu visited the United States and met with Trump and Vance to discuss reciprocal tariffs and the ongoing Gaza war hostage crisis.

In October 2025, the Knesset passed a bill that would extend Israeli sovereignty to all Israeli settlements in the West Bank. The bill was condemned by JD Vance as a "very stupid political stunt".

==== United Arab Emirates ====
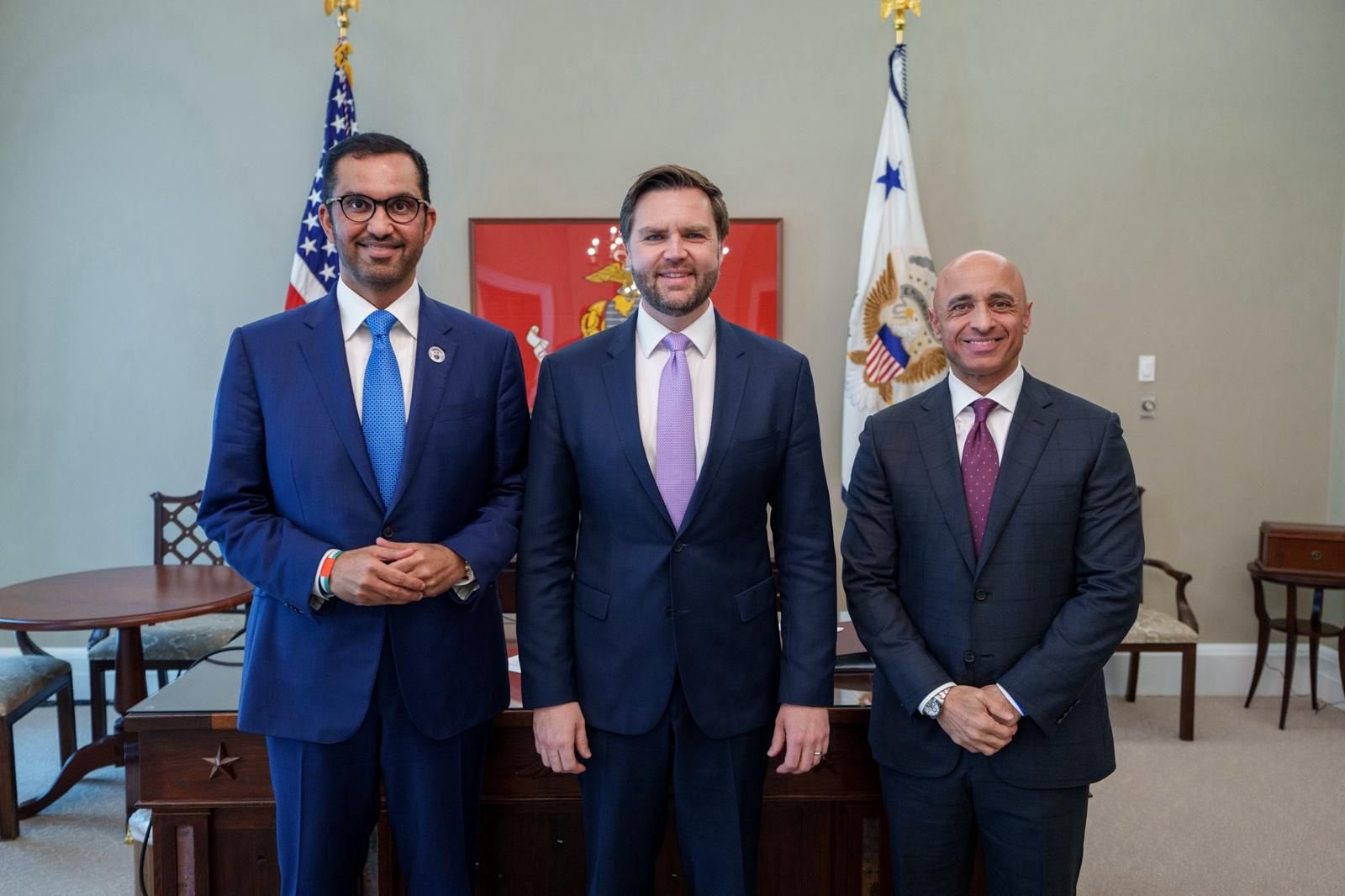
Vance with Emirati industry minister Sultan Al Jaber, March 2025

In March 2025, the United Arab Emirates sent a diplomatic delegation to the United States to invest US$1.4 trillion in the U.S. economy over the next 10 years. The agreement was reached by Sheikh Tahnoun bin Zayed Al Nahyan after a meeting with Trump and a dinner with Vance.

=== Europe ===
==== Denmark ====
The proposed United States acquisition of Greenland and criticism of Denmark's management of its territory by the Trump administration have been received poorly by the Danish government, saying: "we are open to criticism, but... we do not appreciate the tone".

In a February 2025 interview with Maria Bartiromo, Vance stated that Denmark was "not being a good ally" and declared that "the U.S. does not care what the EU screams at them" regarding Greenland.

During Vance's trip to Greenland, a non-sovereign country within the Danish Realm, Vance explicitly declared in a "message to Denmark" that "you have not done a good job", as Vance criticized Denmark for having "underinvested in the security architecture" and "people of Greenland".

==== European Union ====
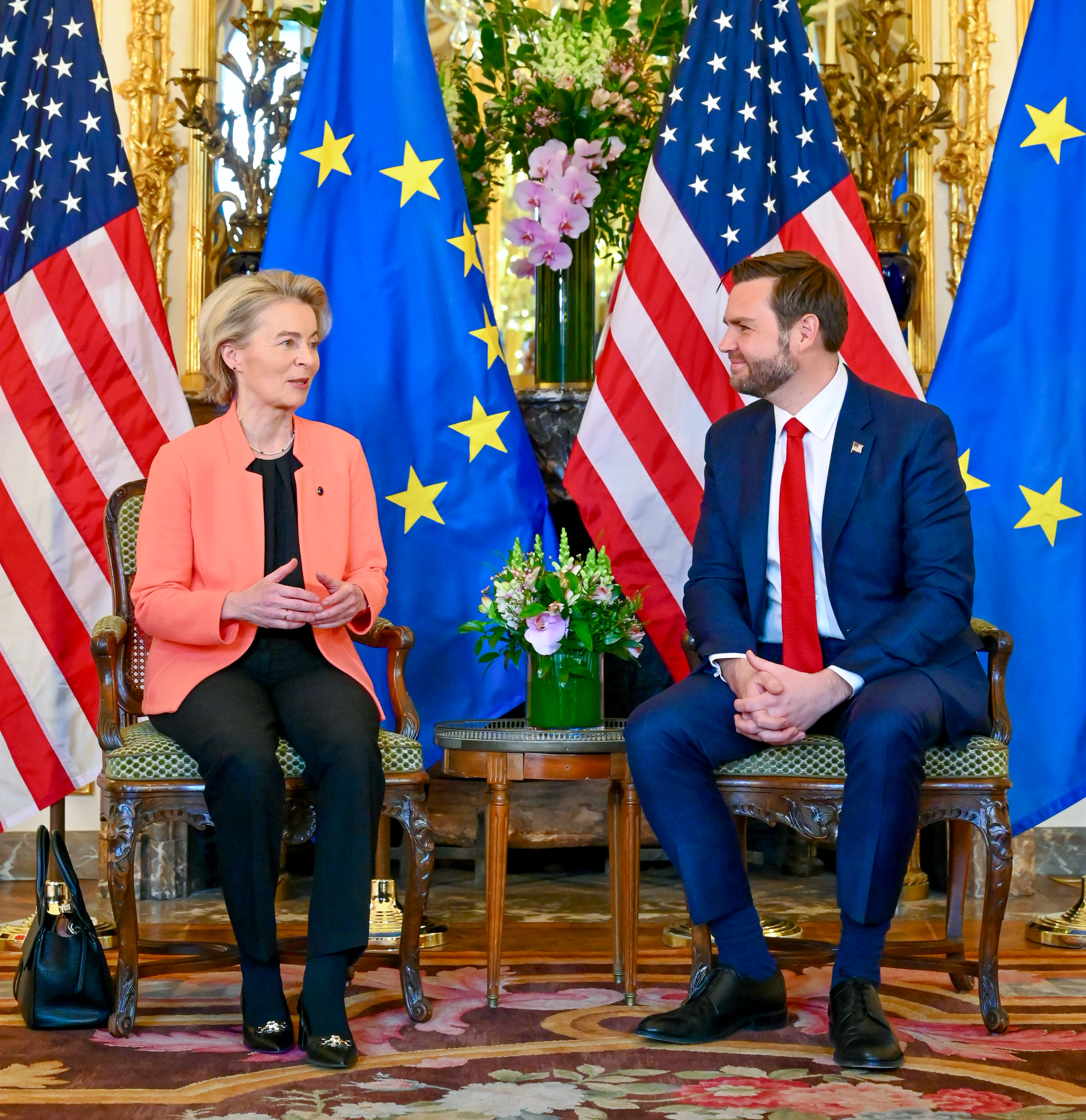
Vance and European Commission president Ursula von der Leyen in Paris, February 2025

In his speech to the 61st Munich Security Conference, Vance addressed several aspects of US–EU relations, including defense spending and security cooperation. While affirming the Trump administration's commitment to European security, Vance emphasized the need for increased European defense contributions. He specifically mentioned the possibility of a "reasonable settlement" between Ukraine and Russia. He also criticized European rhetoric of framing the conflict between Russia and Ukraine as a "defense of democracy" in contrast to his earlier examples of alleged infringements of democratic principles in Europe.

==== Germany ====
In February 2025, Vance met with German chancellor Olaf Scholz in Paris.

During the Munich Security Conference, Vance held a bilateral meeting with German president Frank-Walter Steinmeier. At the start of the meeting, Vance commented on the 2025 Munich car attack, saying: "I wanted, given the attacks yesterday, to offer my condolences from my wife and I" and "Munich is a beautiful city that we've actually visited before, both on work but also on vacation. So very sad for what's happened. And we wish everybody the best as you recover and try to care for the victims and their families".

During the conference, Vance also met with Bundestag member and AfD leader Alice Weidel nine days before the 2025 German federal election. He also met with Leader of the Opposition and Leader of the Christian Democratic Union Friedrich Merz.

==== Ireland ====
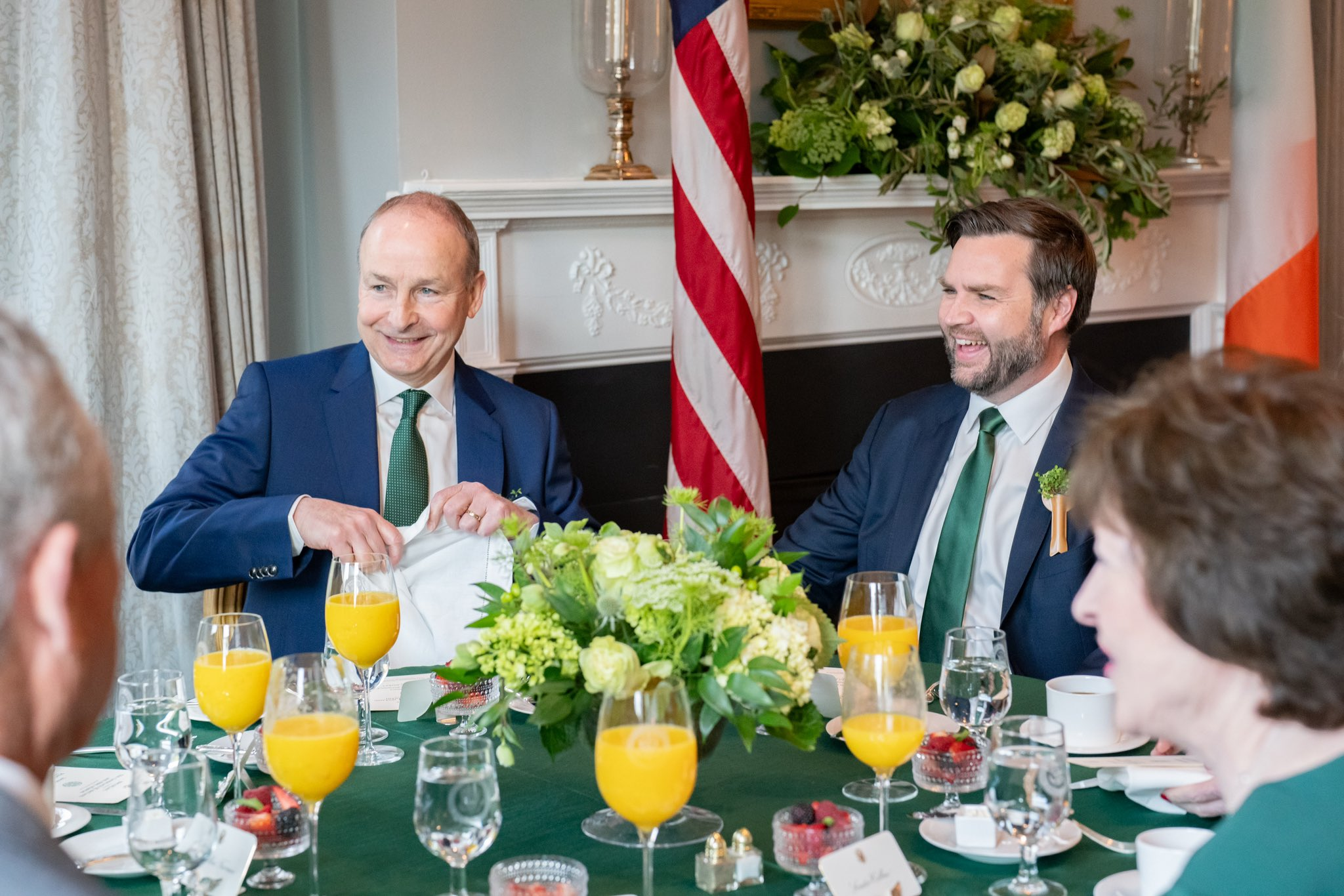
Vance with Taoiseach Micheál Martin at the Naval Observatory, 2025

In March 2025, Taoiseach Micheál Martin visited the United States for the annual St. Patrick's Day celebration at the White House. Prior to the celebration, Vance and Martin met for breakfast at the Naval Observatory. During the meeting, Vance described the US–Irish relationship as "one of the great alliances".

==== Italy ====
On March 21, 2025, Vance held a brief phone call with Lega leader and Italian Deputy Prime Minister Matteo Salvini, during which they talked about illegal immigration, Ukraine peace talks and satellite technology.

On April 18, Vance met with Italian Prime Minister Giorgia Meloni in Rome, praising her conservative stances and her ideological and political affinity with the Trump administration.

==== United Kingdom ====
On December 7, then-Vice President-elect Vance met with UK Leader of the Opposition Kemi Badenoch in Washington, DC to discuss US–UK relations.

On February 14, 2025, Vance met with UK foreign secretary David Lammy in Munich, Germany to discuss US–UK relations. Lammy spoke to the press about his relationship with Vance, saying: "I’ve met him on a few occasions and we have been able to find common ground and get on."

==== Ukraine ====
Vance has stated that he does not want Russia to conquer Ukraine, but supports a "freeze" of "the territorial lines somewhere close to where they are right now". He also supports the exclusion of Ukraine from NATO and providing "some American security assistance over the long term."

=== NATO ===
In an October 2024 interview with Kristen Welker, Vance said the U.S. would "remain in NATO", but claimed NATO member countries were not spending enough for their own security.

In February 2025, Vance met with Secretary General Mark Rutte following his speech at the Munich Security Conference. Rutte spoke to the press about Vance's speech, saying Vance was "absolutely right" about the need for European nations to increase their defense spending, adding: "we have to grow up in that sense and spend much more".

In March 2025, Secretary General Rutte traveled to the United States to participate in a bilateral meeting with Vance, Trump, Pete Hegseth, Mike Waltz, Michael Needham, Keith Kellogg, and Matthew Whitaker in the Oval Office.

=== Expansionism ===
In the lead-up to his second inauguration, Vance supported Trump's proposed plans and ideas that would expand the United States' political influence and territory. The last territory acquired by the United States was in 1947 when the Mariana, Caroline, and Marshall Islands were acquired.

==== Greenland ====
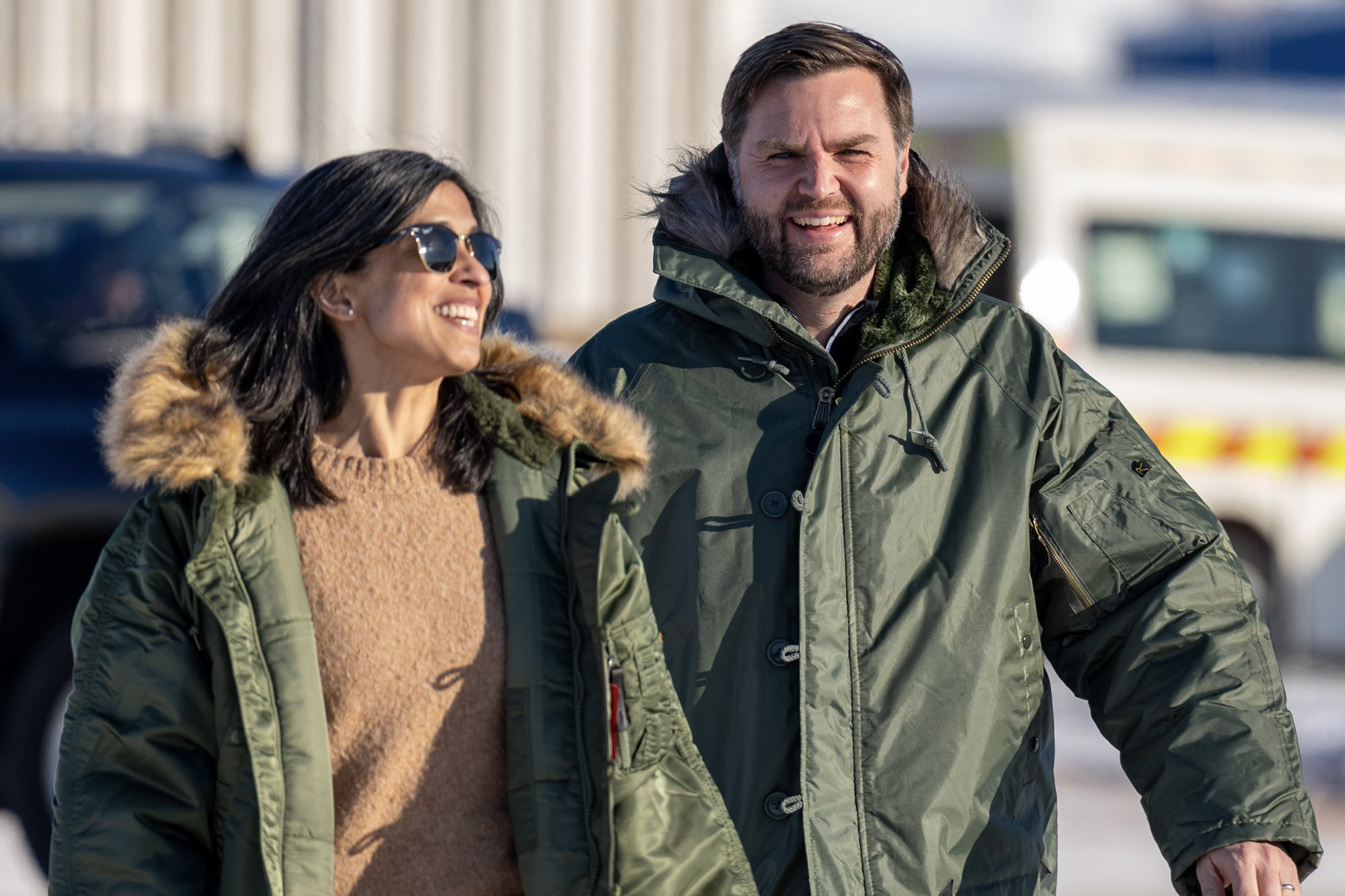
JD and Usha Vance at Pituffik Space Base in Greenland, March 2025

In December 2024, Trump stated a further proposal for the United States to purchase Greenland from Denmark, describing ownership and control of the island as "an absolute necessity" for national security purposes. This builds upon a prior offer from Trump to buy Greenland during his first term, which the Danish Realm refused, causing him to cancel his August 2019 visit to Denmark.

Vance has repeatedly stated that controlling Greenland is critical for U.S. national security and said there's "a deal to be made in Greenland".

In March 2025, Vance became the first sitting U.S. vice president to visit Greenland, appearing at Pituffik Space Base.

==== Panama Canal Zone ====
In 2024, Trump demanded that Panama return control of the Panama Canal to the United States due to 'excessive rates' being charged for American passage. If the United States were to take control of the Panama Canal, it would mark the first time the United States controlled Panamanian territory since the 1989 United States invasion of Panama.

In March 2025, Vance stood behind Trump as he told Congress that his "administration will be reclaiming the Panama Canal." Also that month, Defense secretary Pete Hegseth instructed the Trump administration to "immediately" present "credible military options to ensure fair and unfettered US military and commercial access to the Panama Canal".

=== Holy See ===
On April 19, 2025, Vance, who converted to Catholicism in 2019, met with Holy See Secretary of State Pietro Parolin in Vatican City. During the meeting, Vance reiterated the Trump administration's strong support for freedom of religion and freedom of conscience; the discussion also touched upon "countries affected by war, political tensions and difficult humanitarian situations, with particular attention to migrants, refugees, and prisoners", according to a statement by the Holy See. Vance had previously expressed disagreement with Pope Francis over the latter's strong support for immigrants' rights.

On April 20, Easter Sunday, Vance had a brief meeting with Pope Francis. Vance was the last public official to meet Pope Francis right before his death the very next morning on April 21. He returned to the Vatican on May 18, 2025, to attend the inauguration of Francis' successor, Pope Leo XIV, and met with him in a private audience the following day. The two exchanged gifts per tradition and Vance delivered a letter from President Trump and Melania Trump inviting Pope Leo to visit Washington soon.

== List of international vice presidential trips ==
=== 2025 ===
N°	Country	Area(s) visited	Dates	Description
1	France	Paris, Barbizon	February 10–13	Attended AI Action Summit at the Grand Palais. Was hosted by President Emmanuel Macron at the Elysee Palace. Met with Indian Prime Minister Narendra Modi to discuss energy diversification. Visited the forest of Fontainebleau and Seine-et-Marne.
1	Germany	Munich	February 13–15	Attended the 61st Munich Security Conference
2	Greenland	Pituffik	March 28–29	Visited Pituffik Space Base
3	Italy	Rome	April 18–20	Met Prime Minister Giorgia Meloni
3	Vatican City	Vatican City	April 18–20	Attended an Easter church service. Briefly met Pope Francis.
3	India	New Delhi, Jaipur	April 21–24	Met Prime Minister Narendra Modi
4	Italy	Rome	May 18–19	Met with European Commission President Ursula von der Leyen, Italian Prime Minister Giorgia Meloni and Ukrainian President Volodymyr Zelenskyy.
4	Vatican City	Vatican City	May 18–19	Attended inauguration mass and met with Pope Leo XIV
5	United Kingdom	Cotswolds, Kilmarnock	August 7–17	Private trip. Vacationed with his family in the Cotswolds and Scotland. Addressed U.S. troops at RAF Fairford. Met Foreign Secretary David Lammy, Conservative MPs Robert Jenrick and Chris Philp as well as Reform UK leader Nigel Farage.
6	Israel	Jerusalem, Tel Aviv	October 21–23	Vice President Vance and Second Lady Usha Vance visited Israel to support the implementation of the Gaza ceasefire. He met with U.S. envoys Steve Witkoff and Jared Kushner at Ben Gurion Airport, Israeli Prime Minister Benjamin Netanyahu, President Isaac Herzog, and families of hostages. He also visited the Church of the Holy Sepulchre and observed Gaza from the HaKirya in Tel Aviv.

=== 2026 ===
N°	Country	Area(s) visited	Dates	Description
7	Italy	Milan	February 4–9	Attended the 2026 Winter Olympics opening ceremony, supported Team USA for the Olympics. Met with Prime Minister Giorgia Meloni.
7	Armenia	Yerevan	February 9–10	Met with Prime Minister Nikol Pashinyan.
7	Azerbaijan	Baku	February 10–11	Met with President Ilham Aliyev.
8	Hungary	Budapest	April 7–8	Vice President Vance and Second Lady Usha Vance visited Hungary. Vance held bilateral meetings with Prime Minister Viktor Orbán ahead of the 2026 Hungarian parliamentary election.
9	Pakistan	Islamabad	11-12 April	Vice President JD Vance visited Islamabad, accompanied by Steve Witkoff and Jared Kushner to participate in Islamabad Talks. Also met Prime Minister Shehbaz Sharif. First US Vice President to visit Pakistan since 2011.
10	Switzerland	Bürgenstock	June 21–22	Vice President Vance engaged in talks with a delegation of Iran after the signing of the Islamabad Memorandum.

== Senate presidency ==
=== List of tie-breaking votes cast by JD Vance ===
As President of the Senate, Vance has cast eight tie-breaking votes.

Date	Action	Vote	Ultimate result
January 24, 2025	PN11-7 (Nomination of Peter Hegseth, of Tennessee, to be Secretary of Defense)	Yea: 51–50	Nomination confirmed.
April 30, 2025	Motion to table S.J.Res.49 (A joint resolution terminating the national emergency declared to impose global tariffs.)	Yea: 50–49	Motion tabled.
July 1, 2025	S.Amdt. 2848 to S.Amdt. 2360 to H.R. 1, the One Big Beautiful Bill Act	Yea: 51–50	Amendment agreed to.
July 1, 2025	S.Amdt. 2360 to H.R. 1, the One Big Beautiful Bill Act	Yea: 51–50	Amendment agreed to, as amended.
July 1, 2025	H.R. 1, the One Big Beautiful Bill Act	Yea: 51–50	H.R. 1 passed, as amended.
July 15, 2025	Motion to discharge H.R. 4, the Rescissions Act of 2025	Yea: 51–50	Motion agreed to.
July 15, 2025	Motion to proceed to H.R. 4, the Rescissions Act of 2025	Yea: 51–50	Motion agreed to.
January 14, 2026	Point of order on S.J.Res. 98 (A joint resolution terminating military actions against Venezuela.)	Yea: 51–50	Point of order sustained.

== Elections during the Vance vice presidency ==
Congressional party leaders
		Senate leaders		House leaders	
Congress	Year	Majority	Minority	Speaker	Minority
119th	2025–present	Thune	Schumer	Johnson	Jeffries

Republican seats in Congress
Congress	Senate	House
119th (Note: 17 days of the 119th Congress (January 3, 2025 – January 19, 2025) took place under Vice President Harris.)	53	220

== See also ==
- Second presidency of Donald Trump
- US Senate career of JD Vance
- Electoral history of JD Vance
- Political positions of JD Vance
- Vice presidency of Mike Pence (first presidency of Donald Trump)
