= Electoral history of Donald Trump =

Trump in 2026

Donald Trump, the 45th (2017–2021) and 47th (2025–present) president of the United States, first ran for president in the 2000 election as a candidate for the Reform Party of the United States. He withdrew from the race before the primaries. Trump won the 2016 election running as the Republican Party nominee, despite losing the popular vote. Trump ran for re-election in 2020, but lost to former vice president Joe Biden. He subsequently won the 2024 election against vice president Kamala Harris to serve a non-consecutive second term as president, again as a Republican candidate.

== 2000 presidential election ==
Reform Party presidential primary results by county

California
Donald Trump
John B. Anderson
Robert M. Bowman
Charles E. Collins
George D. Weber
No votes

Michigan
Donald Trump
Uncommitted
Tie
No votes

During the campaign, Trump qualified for the Michigan and California Reform Party presidential primaries. Both of these elections were held after Trump exited the race. On February 22, Trump won the Michigan Primary with 2,164 votes defeating uncommitted with 948 votes. Trump won the California primary on March 7 with 15,311 votes. Eventual Reform nominee Pat Buchanan was not listed on either ballot. A slate of Trump supporters petitioned to list Trump on the New York Independence Party presidential primary ballot but were denied on a technicality.

=== Reform Party primaries ===
2000 Michigan Reform presidential primary
Party	Candidate	Votes	%
Reform	Donald Trump	2,164	69.54%
Reform	Uncommitted	948	30.46%
Total votes		3,112	100.00%

2000 California Reform presidential primary
Party	Candidate	Votes	%
Reform	Donald Trump	15,311	44.28%
Reform	George D. Weber	9,390	27.16%
Reform	Robert M. Bowman	4,879	14.11%
Reform	John B. Anderson	3,158	9.13%
Reform	Charles E. Collins	1,837	5.31%
Total votes		34,575	100.00%

== 2016 presidential election ==
Republican Party presidential primaries results, 2016. Trump states in the blue

Percentage of vote received by Donald Trump by state in the Republican Party presidential primaries, 2016.

=== Republican presidential primaries ===
Candidates listed received at least 0.01% of the total vote:

Candidate	Total votes	Total delegates
Donald Trump	14,015,993 (44.95%)	1,457
Ted Cruz	7,822,100 (25.08%)	553
John Kasich	4,290,448 (13.76%)	160
Marco Rubio	3,515,576 (11.27%)	166
Ben Carson	857,039 (2.75%)	7
Jeb Bush	286,694 (0.92%)	4
Rand Paul	66,788 (0.21%)	2
Chris Christie	57,637 (0.18%)	0
Mike Huckabee	51,450 (0.16%)	1
Carly Fiorina	40,666 (0.13%)	1
Jim Gilmore	18,369 (0.06%)	0
Rick Santorum	16,627 (0.05%)	0
Lindsey Graham	5,666 (0.01%)	0
Elizabeth Gray	5,449 (0.01%)	0

=== General election ===
Electoral College map of the 2016 presidential election

Electoral results
Presidential candidate	Party	Home state	Popular vote		Electoral vote	Running mate		
Presidential candidate	Party	Home state	Count	Percentage	Electoral vote	Vice-presidential candidate	Home state	Electoral vote
Donald Trump	Republican	New York	62,984,828	46.09%	304 (306)	Mike Pence	Indiana	304 (Note: Pence received 305 electoral votes for vice president, but only 304 as part of the Trump–Pence ticket; one faithless elector from Texas voted for Ron Paul as president instead of Trump, and is recorded separately below.)
Hillary Clinton	Democratic	New York	65,853,514	48.18%	227 (232)	Tim Kaine	Virginia	227
Gary Johnson	Libertarian	New Mexico	4,489,341	3.28%	0	William Weld	Massachusetts	0
Jill Stein	Green	Massachusetts	1,457,218	1.07%	0	Ajamu Baraka	Illinois	0
Evan McMullin	Independent	Utah	731,991	0.54%	0	Mindy Finn	District of Columbia	0
Darrell Castle	Constitution	Tennessee	203,090	0.15%	0	Scott Bradley	Utah	0
Gloria La Riva	Socialism and Liberation	California	74,401	0.05%	0	Eugene Puryear	District of Columbia	0
Tickets that received electoral votes from faithless electors
Bernie Sanders (Note: Received electoral vote(s) from a faithless elector)	Independent	Vermont	111,850 (Note: Candidate received votes as a write-in. The exact numbers of write-in votes have been published for three states: California, New Hampshire, and Vermont.)	0.08%	1 (0)	Elizabeth Warren	Massachusetts	1
John Kasich (Note: Two faithless electors from Texas cast their presidential votes for Ron Paul and John Kasich, respectively. Chris Suprun said he cast his presidential vote for John Kasich and his vice presidential vote for Carly Fiorina. The other faithless elector in Texas, Bill Greene, cast his presidential vote for Ron Paul but cast his vice presidential vote for Mike Pence, as pledged. John Kasich received recorded write-in votes in Alabama, Georgia, Illinois, New Hampshire, North Carolina, Pennsylvania, and Vermont.)	Republican	Ohio	2,684	0.00%	1 (0)	Carly Fiorina	Virginia	1
Ron Paul	Libertarian	Texas	124	0.00%	1 (0)	Mike Pence	Indiana	1
Colin Luther Powell	Republican	Virginia	25	0.00%	3 (0)	Elizabeth Warren	Massachusetts	1
Colin Luther Powell	Republican	Virginia	25	0.00%	3 (0)	Maria Cantwell	Washington	1
Colin Luther Powell	Republican	Virginia	25	0.00%	3 (0)	Susan Collins	Maine	1
Faith Spotted Eagle	Democratic	South Dakota	0	0.00%	1 (0)	Winona LaDuke	Minnesota	1
Other			760,210	0.56%	—	Other		—
Total			136,669,276	100%	538			538
Needed to win					270			270

Notes:

Popular vote
Clinton	48.18%
Trump	46.09%
Johnson	3.28%
Stein	1.07%
Others	1.38%

Electoral vote—pledged
Trump/Pence	56.88%
Clinton/Kaine	43.12%

Electoral vote—President
Trump	56.51%
Clinton	42.19%
Powell	0.56%
Kasich	0.19%
Paul	0.19%
Sanders	0.19%
Spotted Eagle	0.19%

Electoral vote—Vice President
Pence	56.69%
Kaine	42.19%
Warren	0.37%
Cantwell	0.19%
Collins	0.19%
Fiorina	0.19%
LaDuke	0.19%

== 2020 presidential election ==
Republican Party presidential primaries results, 2020. Trump states in the blue

=== Republican presidential primaries ===
The table below shows the four candidates that have either (a) held public office, (b) been included in a minimum of five independent national polls, or (c) received substantial media coverage. The president's challengers withdrew from the race after the primaries started, or in the case of De la Fuente, accepted one or more 3rd party nominations.

Candidates	Donald Trump	Bill Weld	Rocky De La Fuente	Joe Walsh	Total delegates, pledged (unpledged/total), and votes
Pledged delegates (unpledged / soft total) (Total awarded: 2,312)	2,311 (38 / 2,273); 90.63%	1 (0 / 1); 0.04%	0 (0 / 0); 0%	0 (0 / 0); 0%	2,443 (107 / 2,550) (90.67% awarded) 19,321,267 votes
Popular votes	18,159,752 (93.99%)	454,402 (2.35%)	108,357 (0.56%)	173,519 (0.90%)	2,443 (107 / 2,550) (90.67% awarded) 19,321,267 votes

=== General election ===
Electoral College map of the 2020 presidential election

Candidates are listed individually below if they received more than 0.1% of the popular vote. Popular vote totals are from the Federal Election Commission report.

Electoral results
Presidential candidate	Party	Home state	Popular vote		Electoral vote	Running mate		
Presidential candidate	Party	Home state	Count	Percentage	Electoral vote	Vice-presidential candidate	Home state	Electoral vote
Joe Biden	Democratic	Delaware	81,283,501	51.31%	306	Kamala Harris	California	306
Donald Trump (incumbent)	Republican	Florida	74,223,975	46.85%	232	Mike Pence (incumbent)	Indiana	232
Jo Jorgensen	Libertarian	South Carolina	1,865,535	1.18%	0	Spike Cohen	South Carolina	0
Howie Hawkins	Green	New York	407,068	0.26%	0	Angela Nicole Walker	South Carolina	0
Other			649,552	0.41%	—	Other		—
Total			158,429,631	100%	538			538
Needed to win					270			270

== 2024 presidential election ==
=== Republican presidential primaries ===
Republican Party presidential primaries results, 2024. Trump states in the blue

Republican primary results
Party	Candidate	Votes	%
Republican	Donald Trump	17,015,756	76.42%
Republican	Nikki Haley	4,381,799	19.68%
Republican	Ron DeSantis	353,615	1.59%
N/A	Uncommitted	154,815	0.70%
Republican	Chris Christie	139,541	0.63%
Republican	Vivek Ramaswamy	96,954	0.44%
Republican	Asa Hutchinson	22,044	0.10%
Republican	Perry Johnson	4,051	0.02%
Republican	Tim Scott	1,598	0.01%
Republican	Doug Burgum	502	0.00%
Republican	Mike Pence	404	0.00%
N/A	Other candidates	93,796	0.42%
Total votes		22,264,875	100.00%

=== General election ===
Electoral College map of the 2024 presidential election

Electoral results
Presidential candidate	Party	Home state	Popular vote		Electoral vote	Running mate		
Presidential candidate	Party	Home state	Count	Percentage	Electoral vote	Vice-presidential candidate	Home state	Electoral vote
Donald Trump	Republican	Florida	77,302,580	49.81%	312	JD Vance	Ohio	312
Kamala Harris	Democratic	California	75,017,613	48.33%	226	Tim Walz	Minnesota	226
Jill Stein	Green	Massachusetts	782,068	0.5%	0	Butch Ware	California	0
Robert F. Kennedy Jr.	Independent	New York	755,018	0.5%	0	Nicole Shanahan	California	0
Other					—	Other		—
Total				100%	538			538
Needed to win					270			270

== See also ==
- Electoral history of Hillary Clinton
- Electoral history of Mike Pence
- Electoral history of Joe Biden
- Electoral history of Kamala Harris
- Electoral history of JD Vance
- Electoral history of Pat Buchanan
- Electoral history of John McCain
- Electoral history of Mitt Romney
- Electoral history of Bill Clinton
- Electoral history of George W. Bush
- Electoral history of Barack Obama
