= Electoral history of JD Vance =

Vance in 2026

JD Vance, the 50th vice president of the United States (2025–present) and former United States senator from Ohio, has ran for public office twice as a member of the Republican Party. He ran in the 2022 United States Senate election in Ohio and in the 2024 United States presidential election as the vice presidential nominee for Donald Trump. Vance was successful in both of these campaigns.

In 2021 after incumbent U.S. Senator Rob Portman announced he would not run for re-election, Vance began a bid to succeed him. Vance won in the Republican primary receiving 32.2% of the vote, defeating Josh Mandel and Matt Dolan. In the general election Vance faced United States House of Representatives member Tim Ryan, who had been serving for 20 years. Due to Ryan's popularity and moderate positions, the race remained competitive but leaned Republican. On election night Vance defeated Ryan, receiving 53.04% of the vote.

In 2024 after former President Donald Trump won the 2024 Republican Party presidential primaries, Vance was speculated to be his vice presidential nominee, as were Marco Rubio and Doug Burgum. Trump selected Vance to be his running mate in the election. The two faced Vice President Kamala Harris and Governor of Minnesota Tim Walz. The race was expected to be close and polling tightened within the days leading up to the election. The Trump–Vance ticket won in a landslide carrying all the battleground states. Vance was inaugurated on January 20, 2025.

Vance has expressed interest in running in the 2028 United States presidential election to succeed Donald Trump in 2029.

== 2022 U.S. Senate election in Ohio ==
Vance had previously considered running in the 2018 United States Senate election in Ohio to challenge incumbent Senator Sherrod Brown though did join that race.

=== Primary ===
Results by county: Vance: 20–30%; 30–40%; 40–50%; Mandel: 20–30%; 30–40%; Dolan: 30–40%; 40–50%

2022 United States Senate Republican primary results in Ohio
Party	Candidate	Votes	%
Republican	JD Vance	344,736	32.22%
Republican	Josh Mandel	255,854	23.92%
Republican	Matt Dolan	249,239	23.30%
Republican	Mike Gibbons	124,653	11.65%
Republican	Jane Timken	62,779	5.87%
Republican	Mark Pukita	22,692	2.12%
Republican	Neil Patel	9,873	0.92%
Total votes		1,069,826	100.0%

After Rob Portman announced he would not run for re-election. Vance received $10 million from Tech business owner Peter Thiel to pursue a campaign. Vance then announced his candidacy for the office.

In April 2022, Vance received an endorsement from former President of the United States Donald Trump which reshaped the crowded primary.

In the primary, Vance's two main competitors were Josh Mandel who was the Ohio State Treasurer and Matt Dolan who was a member of the Ohio Senate, he also faced many other small challengers within the primary.

Vance won the Republican primary with 32.22% of the vote to Mandel's 23.92% and Dolan's 23.30%.

=== General election ===
Final results by Ohio county in 2022: JD Vance: 80–90%; 70–80%; 60–70%; 50–60%; Tim Ryan: 60–70%; 50–60%

2022 United States Senate election in Ohio
Party	Candidate	Votes	%	±%
Republican	JD Vance	2,192,114	53.04%	N/A
Democratic	Tim Ryan	1,939,489	46.92%	N/A
Write-in		1,739	0.04%	N/A
Total votes		4,133,342	100.0%	N/A
Republican hold				

After winning the primary Vance went on to face Tim Ryan who was serving his tenth term in the United States House of Representatives.

Due to Ryan's moderate stance and him voting for some of Donald Trumps policies the race was close but it still leaned Republican.

During the election there was a serious of intense debates and rallies held.

During the last week of the campaign Vance held a rally with former President Donald Trump in an attempt to gather more votes for the party.

On election night Vance defeated Ryan and received 53.04% of the vote to Ryan's 46.92% and was elected to a six-year term in the United States Senate. The race was close compared to the 2022 Ohio gubernatorial election which was held the same night.

Vance was inaugurated on January 3, 2023, for the last two years of the presidency of Joe Biden.

== 2024 vice presidential campaign ==
=== Nomination ===
After former President of the United States Donald Trump won the 2024 Republican Party presidential primaries, he selected Vance as his running mate. Trump also considered Marco Rubio but made him United States Secretary of State, he also considered Doug Burgum but made him United States Secretary of the Interior.

Vance was officially introduced as Trump's running mate at the 2024 Republican National Convention.

2024 Republican National Convention, vice presidential tally
Candidate	Votes	%
JD Vance	– (Note: Chosen by acclamation.)	100.00
Total votes		100.00

=== General election ===
Heading into the general election the pair were originally going to face incumbent President Joe Biden and Vice President Kamala Harris though Biden dropped out after getting calls to due to his age and health. The pair would then face Kamala Harris and Governor of Minnesota, Tim Walz.

With much campaigning from both sides, polls showed the race getting closer and suggested it was going to be a dead-even race.

Electoral College map of the 2024 presidential election

On election night the Trump–Vance ticket defeated Harris–Walz winning 312 electoral votes to 226. Trump and Vance got a total of 49.80% of the popular vote to 48.32% from Harris and Walz. They won the popular vote by 2 million votes.

Trump and Vance carried every single swing state state in the election.

Trump and Vance won in a landslide victory election bid.

On January 20, 2025, JD Vance was inaugurated as the 50th Vice President of the United States.

Since taking office, Vance has expressed interest and has been mentioned as a potential candidate in the 2028 United States presidential election to succeed term-limited president Donald Trump.

Electoral results
Presidential candidate	Party	Home state	Popular vote		Electoral vote	Running mate		
Presidential candidate	Party	Home state	Count	Percentage	Electoral vote	Vice-presidential candidate	Home state	Electoral vote
Donald Trump	Republican	Florida	77,302,580	49.80%	312	JD Vance	Ohio	312
Kamala Harris	Democratic	California	75,017,613	48.32%	226	Tim Walz	Minnesota	226
Jill Stein	Green	Massachusetts	782,068	0.5%	0	Butch Ware	California	0
Robert F. Kennedy Jr.	Independent	New York	755,018	0.5%	0	Nicole Shanahan	California	0
Other					—	Other		—
Total				100%	538			538
Needed to win					270			270

== See also ==
- Electoral history of Donald Trump
- Electoral history of Kamala Harris
- Electoral history of Mike Pence
- Electoral history of Joe Biden

Career in elected offices

- US Senate career of JD Vance
- Vice presidency of JD Vance
