= Karen Friedman Agnifilo =

American attorney and legal commentator (born 1966)

- Born: Karen Pauline Friedman; August 13, 1966 (age 60)
- Education: University of California, Los Angeles (Bachelor's degree); Georgetown University Law Center (JD)
- Occupation: Attorney
- Known for: Podcasts including MissTrial and Legal AF; High profile legal cases, including Luigi Mangione's defense for the killing of Brian Thompson
- Spouse: Marc A. Agnifilo (m. 1996)
- Children: 3
- Website: agilawgroup.com

Karen Pauline Friedman Agnifilo (/ˌæɡnɪˈfiːloʊ/ AG-nif-EE-loh; née Friedman; born August 13, 1966) is an American attorney and legal commentator. She is of counsel at Agnifilo Intrater LLP and previously served as Chief Assistant District Attorney under Manhattan District Attorney Cyrus Vance Jr. Friedman Agnifilo is a frequent media analyst, and co-hosts the popular legal podcasts MissTrial and Legal AF.

== Education ==
Karen Friedman Agnifilo earned her undergraduate degree from the University of California, Los Angeles in 1988 and her Juris Doctor from Georgetown University Law Center in 1992.

== Career ==
=== Manhattan District Attorney's Office ===
Friedman Agnifilo spent the majority of her career in public service in New York City's criminal justice system. She worked in the Manhattan District Attorney's Office for over two decades, holding several senior roles. From 2014 to 2021, she served as Chief Assistant District Attorney, the second-highest position in the office. In this role, she oversaw more than 500 attorneys and a $120 million budget, and played a significant role in high-profile cases, including the prosecutions of Harvey Weinstein and Allen Weisselberg, the chief financial officer of the Trump Organization. Friedman Agnifilo also served as Deputy Chief of the Sex Crimes Unit for four years.

During her tenure, Friedman Agnifilo was instrumental in establishing specialized units, including the Human Trafficking Unit, Hate Crimes Unit, Antiquities Trafficking Unit, Cybercrimes and Identity Theft Bureau, and the Terrorism Unit. She also helped develop Manhattan's first Mental Health Court, focusing on addressing underlying mental health issues in criminal cases. Friedman Agnifilo resigned from the Manhattan District Attorney's in 2021, coinciding with District Attorney Cyrus Vance Jr.'s decision not to seek re-election as DA. When she left public service she was given a bagpipe sendoff from the NYPD and DA's office.

=== General Counsel to the Mayor's Office ===
Before her role as Chief Assistant District Attorney, Friedman Agnifilo served as General Counsel to the New York City Mayor's Office of Criminal Justice during Michael Bloomberg's administration. She played a pivotal role in overhauling the city's criminal justice policies, focusing on reforms that addressed systemic issues.

=== Private practice ===
Since 2021, Friedman Agnifilo has been in private practice. Until 2024 she was with Geragos Global, and since 2023 she has been partner then of counsel at Agnifilo Intrater LLP. Her work focuses on defending clients in state and federal criminal cases. She has stated: "There's no crime necessarily that I wouldn't take or even set of factors that I wouldn't take. I do believe that everyone's entitled to a defense and to good representation, and I've always believed that."

=== Notable cases ===
==== Dominique Strauss-Kahn case ====
In 2011, Friedman Agnifilo's husband, Marc A. Agnifilo, was hired as part of the defense team for International Monetary Fund (IMF) Director Dominique Strauss-Kahn, who had been arrested on charges of sexual assault. At the time, Friedman Agnifilo was serving as the chief of the trial division in the Manhattan District Attorney's Office, which was prosecuting the case. Because of the conflict of interest, she recused herself from the case. Her recusal was noted as a significant loss to the prosecution's team because of her background as a former deputy chief of the sex crimes unit. Friedman Agnifilo recused herself around 20 other times to avoid conflicts of interest in cases that her husband was involved with. The Strauss-Kahn case was an example of the complexities of Friedman Agnifilo's and her husband's professional lives, as her role as a prosecutor and his as a defense attorney often required them to avoid discussing legal matters to maintain ethical boundaries.

==== Luigi Mangione defense ====
In December 2024, Friedman Agnifilo was retained to defend Luigi Mangione, who was charged with the murder of UnitedHealthcare CEO Brian Thompson. Friedman Agnifilo publicly criticized the handling of Mangione's extradition and arraignment, alleging it was heavily politicized and undermined her client's right to a fair trial. She referred to the extradition process as "the biggest staged perp walk I've ever seen in my career" and accused New York City officials, including Mayor Eric Adams, of using the case for political purposes.

== Media and public commentary ==
Friedman Agnifilo is a frequent legal analyst on television networks, including CNN and MSNBC, providing insights on criminal law and high-profile cases. She also serves as a legal advisor for the television show Law & Order. Friedman Agnifilo co-hosts the weekly legal podcast and YouTube channel called MissTrial on the MeidasTouch network with E. Danya Perry and Kathleen Rice, which regularly draws hundreds of thousands of listeners. She also co-hosts the legal podcast Legal AF (Legal Analysis Friends) on the MeidasTouch network with Ben Meiselas and Michael Popok. She is one of the most viewed legal analysts on YouTube.

== Personal life ==
Friedman Agnifilo is married to fellow defense attorney Marc Antony Agnifilo, who has represented Sean Combs and Dominique Strauss-Kahn in their trials for sex crimes, pharmaceutical CEO Martin Shkreli, NXIVM sex cult leader Keith Raniere, and lobbyist Paul Manafort. The two met in 1992 at the Manhattan DA's office, and married on August 25, 1996. During her tenure as Chief Assistant District Attorney, Friedman Agnifilo had to recuse herself around 20 times to avoid conflicts of interest in cases that her husband was involved with. The couple has three adult children. Their twin daughters' interest in the Black Lives Matter movement influenced Agnifilo's views on criminal justice reform. They also have a child with autism. One of her daughters became a mother in 2023.
