= Ron Filipkowski =

American criminal defense attorney and former prosecutor (born 1968)

- Born: October 30, 1968 (age 57)
- Occupation: Attorney
- Political party: Democratic (since 2021)
- Other political affiliations: Republican (until 2021)
- Children: 5

Ron Filipkowski (born October 30, 1968) is an American criminal defense attorney and former state and federal prosecutor who is known for sharing political clips and commentary on social media. He is the editor-in-chief of MeidasTouch Network, a liberal news website.

== Early life ==
Filipkowski grew up on Cape Cod with his mother, a single parent. He worked to pay his college fees.

== Career ==
Filipkowski served as a Marine from 1986 to 1990. In 2008, Filipkowski ran on the Republican ticket for public defender in Florida's 12th Judicial Circuit. He was elected president of the Republican Club of South Sarasota County in 2009 and 2010. In December 2020, Filipkowski resigned from his judicial nominating committee appointment, citing Florida governor Ron DeSantis's handling of the COVID-19 pandemic. His departure came a day after data analyst Rebekah Jones had her home raided by Florida's Department of Law Enforcement.

Prior to the 2020 U.S. presidential election, Filipkowski started tracking far-right extremists on social media, working with two anonymous researchers to monitor livestreamed events, social media, podcasts and radio shows and post their findings on Twitter. In February 2022, Filipkowski said he and his team had turned over "hundreds of very obscure interviews and podcasts from the planners, leaders and participants" of the January 6 Capitol attack to the January 6 Committee.

Filipkowski is the editor-in-chief of the liberal news website MeidasTouch Network. He has written opinion pieces for The Daily Beast. In 2024, he said, "The Meidas guys, as a team, said: We are going to do this to Trump. We are going to hit every gaffe, every mispronunciation, every slurred word, every mispronounced name, every time he mixes up a name. We're going to clip that and we're going to put it out and we're going to put it in montages. No one else was doing that."

== Views ==
Filipkowski was a member of the Republican Party until January 2021, when he registered as a Democrat following the January 6 Capitol attack. He describes himself as a moderate Democrat. Filipkowski is critical of Donald Trump and DeSantis. During the 2020 election cycle, Filipkowski recorded a video consisting of reasons he thought the Republican Party should not re-elect Trump as part of an ad campaign by Republican Voters Against Trump, a group launched by Bill Kristol.

In December 2020, Filipkowski criticized DeSantis's handling of the COVID-19 pandemic as "reckless and irresponsible". Following a raid on Rebekah Jones's home, he suggested that she was targeted for questioning DeSantis's approach to the pandemic. After Jones's accusations of being fired for not manipulating COVID-19 data were determined to be unfounded, Filipkowski has since criticized her as a "fraud" and a "grifter".

== Personal life ==
Filipkowski is married. He and his wife have five children; their first son is named Ronald Reagan Filipkowski. Filipkowski has coached a Little League Baseball team, leading it to six state championships. In 2010, he was named the 13-U National Coach of the Year by the baseball publication Travel Ball Select. In 2011, he published a manual for youth baseball coaches titled Travelball: How to Start and Manage a Successful Travel Baseball Team. Filipkowski ran triathlons, competing in the national championship when he was 50. He later suffered nerve damage to his foot while running sprints, preventing him from running.
