= MeidasTouch =

American progressive online media network

- Founded: March 2020; 6 years ago
- Founders: Ben Meiselas; Brett Meiselas; Jordan Meiselas
- Type: Media organization
- Purpose: U.S. news and politics
- Key people: Ron Filipkowski (editor-in-chief)
- Website: meidasnews.com

Substack information
- Newsletter: Meidas+
- Subscribers: 822,000

TikTok information
- Page: meidastouch
- Followers: 2.5 million

YouTube information
- Channel: MeidasTouch
- Genre: Commentary
- Subscribers: 6.03 million
- Views: 8.4 billion
- Last updated: December 26, 2025

MeidasTouch (pronounced "Midas touch") is an American progressive media company. The network describes itself as doing pro-democracy journalism.

Previously, the MeidasTouch name was used by its founders for a liberal American political action committee formed in March 2020 with the purpose of stopping the reelection of Donald Trump in the 2020 United States presidential election. The SuperPAC aligned with the Democratic Party in the 2020 United States presidential election, the 2020–21 United States Senate and United States Senate special elections in Georgia.

The PAC changed its name to Democracy Defense Action in 2023. The MeidasTouch name continues to be used by the MeidasTouch Network, the news organization.

== History ==
The committee was founded in March 2020 by Ben, Brett and Jordan Meiselas, three brothers who grew up in Plainview, New York, on Long Island, while in quarantine due to the COVID-19 pandemic. The group name and slogan come from their mother and father, combining their surname and their mother's maiden name, Golden, alluding to the mythological Greek king Midas known for his ability to turn everything he touched into gold.

On July 21, 2023, MeidasTouch filed paperwork to rename itself to Democracy Defense Action, and later that year, news reporting indicated the MeidasTouch name was being used for a news network called MeidasTouch Network.

=== Political Action Committee ===
==== 2020 U.S. presidential election ====
On April 22, 2020, the committee released their first video, titled "Are You Better Off?", an allusion to Ronald Reagan's famous line in the 1980 general election presidential debate, which criticized Trump's handling of the COVID-19 pandemic in the United States; The committee shared the video in a Twitter reply to George Conway, which was then retweeted by him.

On June 6, 2020, another video was released, called "Bye Ivanka"; it took parts out of her commencement speech and focused on her relation with China and criticized Trump's handling of the COVID-19 pandemic. Her Wichita State University Tech speech was canceled due to student and teacher pressure.

On June 17, 2020, another video was released, "Gop Cowards", which accused Republican senators of being cowards. Near the end of the video, followers are urged to vote 11 Republican legislators out.

On June 23, the committee released a video called "Trump Kills US". The video focuses on Trump's comment at his Tulsa rally which urged doctors to "slow the testing down". MeidasTouch called it "Mass murder on a national scale".

On July 8, a new video was released called "Creepy Trump". It compiled Kellyanne Conway's comments on Joe Biden and put it together with Trump statements. The ad uses clips of Conway's comments and remarks Trump has presented about women, and was played on Fox News, CNN and MSNBC.

On July 14, another video was released called "#ByeDonJr". It takes Donald Trump Jr.'s comments on Fox News about Biden and applies them against Trump. The video also further criticizes the older Trump's handling of the pandemic.

The group continued its activities after the November 3 elections. On November 27, it claimed credit for making #DiaperDon the top Twitter trending topic in the US, via a tweet that mocked (as summarized by The Independent) a "press briefing ... which saw [Donald Trump] furiously assail a reporter from behind a surprisingly small desk", and provoked Trump into calling for the immediate abolishing of Section 230 "for purposes of National Security".

==== 2020–2021 Georgia Senate elections ====
The SuperPAC targeted Republican candidates in the 2020–21 United States Senate election in Georgia and the 2020–21 United States Senate special election in Georgia with several televised attack ads, billboards, direct mailings and door-to-door canvassing efforts.

Most notably, MeidasTouch aired an advertisement called "The Grinches of Georgia." CNN said of the ads, "Humor is the chosen route for Democrat-backed Meidas Touch. Their television ads show Perdue and Loeffler with green faces and Grinch-like features. A nursery rhyme narration includes the verse, "Their stockings were stuffed from the stocks that were sold, when they heard Covid was coming, before we were told." The Hill credits MeidasTouch as framing the Republican candidates Kelly Loeffler and David Perdue as "Looting Loeffler" and "Chicken Perdue," respectively. "The ad takes aim at the senators—dubbed 'Looting Loeffler and Chicken Perdue'—and highlights the controversies surrounding their stock purchases," The Hill said. The "Grinches" ad campaign also included matching billboards and mailers.

=== News network and podcast ===
On July 22, 2024, shortly after JD Vance was named Donald Trump's running mate, MeidasTouch editor-in-chief Ron Filipkowski posted a clip from a 2021 Fox News interview in which Vance stated, "we are effectively run in this country via the Democrats, via our corporate oligarchs, by a bunch of childless cat ladies who are miserable at their own lives and the choices that they've made and so they want to make the rest of the country miserable too." The resurfaced remarks from Vance sparked viral outrage against the candidate across social media, with many celebrities weighing in, including Jennifer Aniston and Taylor Swift. Swift, referencing Vance's comments, signed off her post endorsing Kamala Harris as a "childless cat lady."

In 2024, Adam Mockler joined MeidasTouch as a contributor, anchoring coverage and commentary. By 2026, he was being invited to sit on panels for television network programs.

Following the 2024 presidential election, prominent Democratic politicians such as Joe Biden, Hakeem Jeffries, Elizabeth Warren, and Adam Schiff have made appearances on the podcast. As of March 2025, the network had 12 full-time employees and 30 regular contributors.

MeidasTouch has also weighed in on Canadian politics, with New Democratic Party MP Charlie Angus appearing as a guest commentator. In September 2025, Angus launched MeidasTouch's Canadian channel, MeidasCanada, on Labour Day.

In July 2025, MeidasTouch unearthed a video clip of a 2010 deposition by convicted sex offender Jeffrey Epstein, in which he was asked if he had socialized with underage girls in the presence of Donald Trump.

In October 2025, MeidasTouch broke the news that Donald Trump planned to fire munitions over the Interstate 5 in California, causing the interstate's closure, during the No Kings Protests. The Trump administration initially denied the reporting. The San Francisco Chronicle later reported on munitions striking two California Highway Patrol vehicles on October 18, 2025. An investigation by the U.S. Marines Corps described the incident as the result of a "one in a million" malfunction. The report determined that the explosion was "highly improbable; beyond reasonable expectations and should not have happened, but it did."

In March 2026, Forbes described MeidasTouch as using "a 'trial lawyer approach,' combining legal analysis (by attorney Ben Meiselas), media commentary and brotherly banter to explain complex political issues—setting it apart from, for instance, CNN or other cable news opinion-based roundtables."

=== Book publication ===
In October 2026, MeidasTouch founders Ben, Brett, and Jordy Meiselas published WTF America?! The Way Out of This Hell and Back to Democracy through Grand Central Publishing, an imprint of Hachette Book Group. The nonfiction book examines American politics, threats to democratic institutions, and the development of the MeidasTouch Network.

The book debuted at No. 2 on The New York Times Combined Print & E-Book Nonfiction bestseller list. It also ranked No. 12 on USA Today's overall bestseller list, and No. 5 on Publishers Weekly's Hardcover Frontlist Nonfiction bestseller list. The book also appeared on The Globe and Mail's Canadian bestseller list.

== Founders ==
The Meiselas brothers grew up on Long Island. Their father, Kenny Meiselas, is an entertainment lawyer who has represented Lady Gaga, The Weeknd, Nicki Minaj and Sean "Diddy" Combs.

Brett Meiselas (born 1989 or 1990) is an Emmy-winning video editor who worked for The Ellen DeGeneres Show. Jordan Meiselas (born 1992 or 1993) is a marketing supervisor living in Brooklyn, New York.

Ben Meiselas (born May 19, 1985) is a former attorney. His bar mitzvah party was held at Justin's, a now-defunct restaurant owned by Sean Combs. Ben studied law in Georgetown, and worked as an intern for Steve Israel, Hillary Clinton and Sean Combs.

Ben represented former NFL player Colin Kaepernick and the attendees of the Fyre Festival, together with his boss Mark Geragos. In December 2022, he partnered with Geragos to form Engine Vision Media and acquire Los Angeles magazine from Hour Media. In 2023, Ben quit his job as an attorney to devote his efforts to MeidasTouch.

Ben married his longtime partner Xochitl Marin in May 2024. They have a daughter. Ben appeared in the Fyre Festival documentaries Fyre and Fyre Fraud, both released in 2019.

== Reception ==
=== Political action committee ===
MeidasTouch was described in October 2020 as "a viral video powerhouse" by The Hollywood Reporter. The magazine noted it "caught the attention of politically inclined Hollywood A-listers like Judd Apatow, Mark Ruffalo and Ken Jeong." In October 2020, Variety described MeidasTouch's videos as "razor-sharp."

In April 2021, Seth Hettena of Rolling Stone questioned the effectiveness of MeidasTouch's television advertising strategy during the 2020 election and raised concerns about its fundraising communications and financial transparency.

In February 2022, singer-songwriter India Arie shared a compilation of podcaster Joe Rogan saying the racial slur "nigger" on The Joe Rogan Experience on Instagram. Rogan apologized, calling his past language "regretful and shameful" while also saying that the clips were "taken out of context" and he only quoted the slur to discuss its use by others. The footage in question was first published by the political action committee PatriotTakes, an affiliate of MeidasTouch. This resulted in allegations of a defamation attempt by MeidasTouch, which the founders denied in an interview with Barstool Sports founder Dave Portnoy, instead attributing the source of the footage to Alex Jones, who was a recurring guest on Rogan's show. Rogan described the video compilation as a "political hit job".

=== News website and podcast ===
MeidasTouch has been characterized as progressive, liberal and left-leaning. It has been noted for its anti-Trump stance.

In June 2024, MeidasTouch was described in the Columbia Journalism Review as being made for social media, unlike a lot of more traditional left-leaning media outlets, and provides commentary and news that connects with viewers who have the perception that the mainstream media was too sympathetic to Trump.

In February 2025, Podscribe listed The MeidasTouch Podcast as the top podcast in its rankings of monthly downloads and plays for the period of January 1–February 12, beating out The Joe Rogan Experience. Downloads and plays increased by 141% in February 12–March 12, making The MeidasTouch Podcast the top podcast in that ranking, while the MeidasTouch Network was the #2 podcast publisher, by downloads and plays, after Spotify. While the number of listeners per episode and YouTube subscribers remains significantly lower than Joe Rogan due to MeidasTouch releasing so many 10–20-minute episodes, its growth since the reelection of Donald Trump has mirrored other progressive podcasts and online shows like Pod Save America and The Young Turks.

In March 2025, Media Matters identified MeidasTouch as the 4th most-popular progressive online show across the most popular streaming and social media platforms, with 6.4 million total viewers. That month, John Ross and Nathan J. Robinson, writing in Current Affairs, unfavorably compared the podcast to The Joe Rogan Experience and said, "Even though it is targeted at viewers who think Trump is dumb, the content is remarkably shallow, by which we mean that it doesn't dive seriously into topics like health care, criminal punishment, foreign policy, and inequality. It's the National Enquirer for Trump-haters." They also criticized MeidasTouch's lack of coverage of left-wing concerns and substantive policy, such as environmental issues, the Gaza genocide and Trump's efforts to crack down on pro-Palestinian protests, as well as MeidasTouch's close ties to the Democratic Party.

The MeidasTouch Podcast was awarded Podcast of the Year at the 29th Annual Webby Awards in April 2025. Journalist Molly Jong-Fast presented The MeidasTouch Podcast hosts with the award. That month, Virginia Heffernan of The New Republic noted the podcasters embracing a liberal version of masculinity, focusing on strength in fighting bullies and speaking truth to power.

Der Spiegel highlighted MeidasTouch's international coverage in its May 2025 issue, particularly as it relates to Donald Trump's threats against Greenland and Canada.

In July 2025, The MeidasTouch Podcast overtook The Joe Rogan Experience for the first time on YouTube's weekly podcast ranking.

In March 2026, Forbes noted that the show "has often supplanted Joe Rogan's long-running podcast for the top spot in Podtrac ratings."

The MeidasTouch Podcast was awarded Best News Podcast at the 2026 IHeartRadio Podcast Awards, beating nominees including The Daily, The Megyn Kelly Show, Pivot, and Up First from NPR. The show also won The Advertiser's Choice award at the 2026 Indie Podcast and Creator Awards held at the 2026 South By Southwest (SXSW) Conference by Oxford Road.

== Notable contributors ==
=== Current ===
- Charlie Angus – former MP and member of Canada's New Democratic Party
- Dave Aronberg
- Karen Friedman Agnifilo
- Jack Cocchiarella
- Ron Filipkowski (editor-in-chief)
- Scott MacFarlane
- Aaron Parnas
- Katie Phang

=== Former ===
- Michael Cohen

== See also ==
- Courier Newsroom
- Democracy Docket
- More Perfect Union
- The Lever
