= Electoral history of Mike Pence =

Elections featuring US Vice President

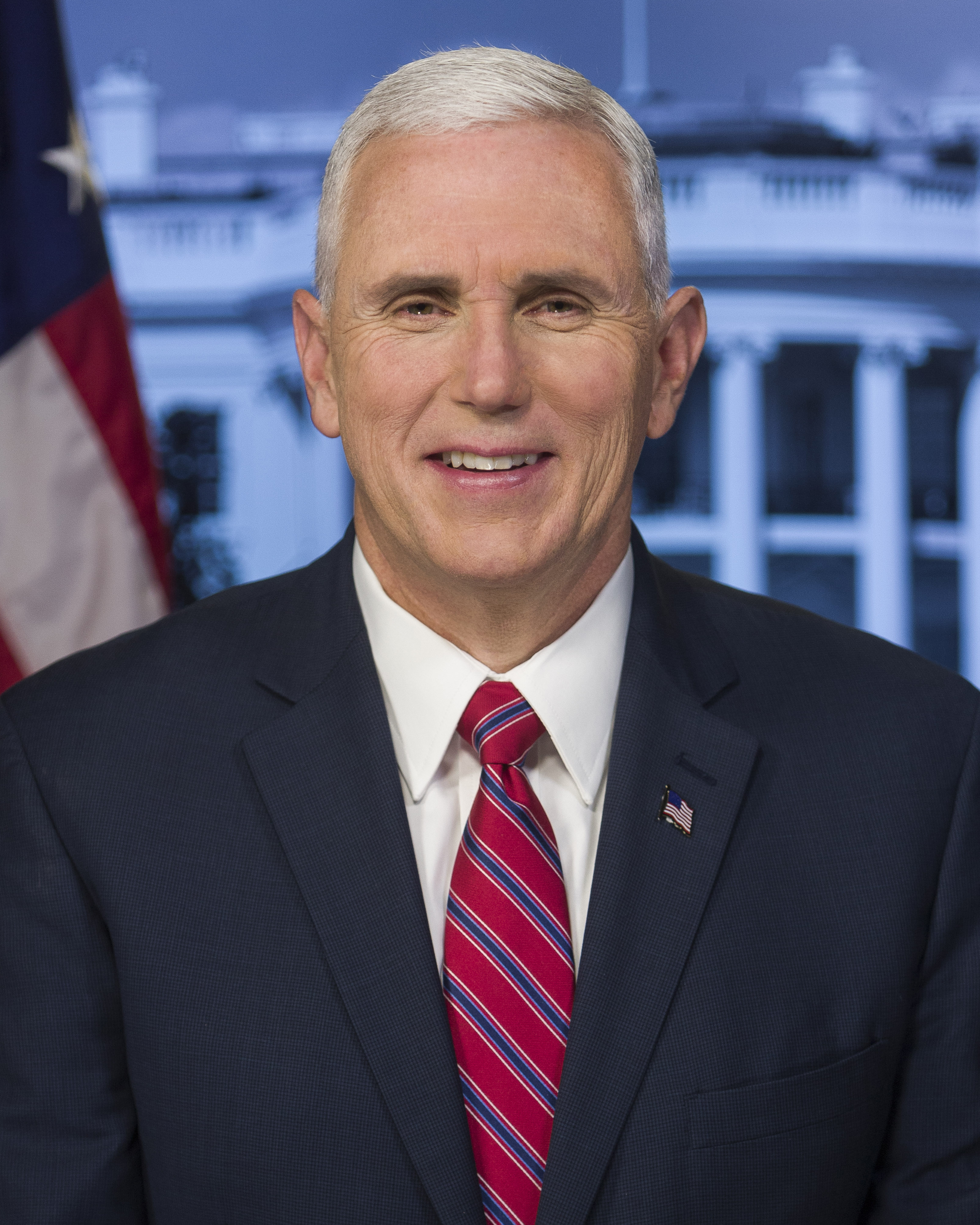
2016 Inaugural Portrait

Mike Pence, the 48th vice president of the United States (2017–2021), has run for public office several times, beginning in 1988. He is a member of the Republican Party, one of two major parties in the United States. Pence represented Indiana's 2nd (2001–2003) and 6th (2003–2013) congressional districts in the United States House of Representatives, and served as the 50th Governor of Indiana (2013–2017).

Pence began political career in 1988 by challenging incumbent Democratic Representative Philip Sharp. He lost the general election in a landslide. Pence ran again in 1990; he lost to Sharp by an even larger margin. In 2000, he made his third run for Congress to replace retiring Representative David McIntosh, when he was finally elected to represent the district. He ran for reelection five times, never winning by less than 60 percent. In 2012, instead of seeking another term in the House, Pence ran in the 2012 Indiana gubernatorial election; he won the Republican nomination unopposed. He selected Sue Ellspermann a member of the Indiana House of Representatives to be his running mate. They defeated the Democratic ticket of John R. Gregg, former Speaker of the Indiana State House of Representatives, and his running mate, State Senator Vi Simpson.

In 2016, Pence, alongside Eric Holcomb, who Pence appointed Lieutenant Governor after Ellspermann's resignation, was set to run in the 2016 gubernatorial election. However, despite winning the Republican nomination, Pence withdrew from the race after Republican nominee Donald Trump selected him as his running mate in 2016 United States presidential election. Despite losing the popular vote, Trump and Pence defeated the Democratic ticket of Hillary Clinton, former United States Secretary of State, and her running mate, Senator Tim Kaine of Virginia. Their victory was considered one of the largest upsets in American politics. In the 2020 United States presidential election, Trump and Pence sought a second term, they were defeated by Democrats former Vice President Joe Biden and Senator Kamala Harris of California. However, Trump did not concede and instead claimed fraud. Despite pressure from Trump, Pence refused to overturn the results resulting in the January 6 United States Capitol attack. In 2023, Pence ran for president, seeking the Republican nomination. However, he dropped out before the 2024 Republican Party presidential primaries.

== House of Representatives (1988–1990, 2000–2012) ==
=== 1988 ===
1988 Indiana's 2nd congressional district election
Party	Candidate	Votes	%
Democratic	Philip R. Sharp (incumbent)	116,915	53.20
Republican	Mike Pence	102,846	46.80
Total votes		219,761	100.00

=== 1990 ===
A week after his 1988 loss, Pence told The Indianapolis News he was considering running in 1990, saying "We're looking hard at that option."

1990 Indiana's 2nd congressional district election
Party	Candidate	Votes	%
Democratic	Philip R. Sharp (incumbent)	93,495	59.37
Republican	Mike Pence	63,980	40.63
Total votes		157,475	100.00

=== 2000 ===
2000 Indiana's 2nd congressional district election
Party	Candidate	Votes	%
Republican	Mike Pence	106,023	50.87
Democratic	Robert Rock	80,885	38.81
Independent	Bill Frazier	19,077	9.15
Libertarian	Michael E. Anderson	2,422	1.16
Total votes		208,407	100.00

=== 2002 ===
2002 Indiana's 6th congressional district Republican Party primary
Party	Candidate	Votes	%
Republican	Mike Pence (incumbent)	55,142	100.00
Total votes		55,142	100.00

2002 Indiana's 6th congressional district election
Party	Candidate	Votes	%
Republican	Mike Pence (incumbent)	118,436	63.79
Democratic	Melina Ann Fox	63,871	34.40
Libertarian	Doris Robertson	3,346	1.80
Total votes		185,653	100.00
Republican hold			

=== 2004 ===
2004 Indiana's 6th congressional district Republican Party primary
Party	Candidate	Votes	%
Republican	Mike Pence (incumbent)	61,794	100.00
Total votes		61,794	100.00

2004 Indiana's 6th congressional district election
Party	Candidate	Votes	%
Republican	Mike Pence (incumbent)	182,529	67.09
Democratic	Melina Ann Fox	85,123	31.29
Libertarian	Chad (Wick) Roots	4,397	1.62
Total votes		272,049	100.00
Republican hold			

=== 2006 ===
2006 Indiana's 6th congressional district Republican Party primary
Party	Candidate	Votes	%
Republican	Mike Pence (incumbent)	52,188	86.13
Republican	George Holland	8,406	13.87
Total votes		60,594	100.00

2006 Indiana's 6th congressional district election
Party	Candidate	Votes	%
Republican	Mike Pence (incumbent)	115,266	60.01
Democratic	Barry A. Welsh	76,812	39.99
Total votes		192,078	100.00
Republican hold			

=== 2008 ===
2008 Indiana's 6th congressional district Republican Party primary
Party	Candidate	Votes	%
Republican	Mike Pence (incumbent)	46,488	100.00
Total votes		46,488	100.00

2008 Indiana's 6th congressional district election
Party	Candidate	Votes	%
Republican	Mike Pence (incumbent)	180,549	63.96
Democratic	Barry A. Welsh	94,223	33.38
Libertarian	George T. Holland	7,534	2.67
Total votes		282,306	100.00
Republican hold			

=== 2010 ===
2010 Indiana's 6th congressional district Republican Party primary
Party	Candidate	Votes	%
Republican	Mike Pence (incumbent)	61,381	100.00
Total votes		61,381	100.00

2010 Indiana's 6th congressional district election
Party	Candidate	Votes	%
Republican	Mike Pence (incumbent)	126,027	66.57
Democratic	Barry A. Welsh	56,647	29.92
Libertarian	Talmage "T.J." Thompson, Jr.	6,635	3.51
Total votes		189,309	100.00
Republican hold			

== Indiana gubernatorial (2012-2016) ==
=== 2012 ===
2012 Indiana Republican Party gubernatorial primary
Party	Candidate	Votes	%
Republican	Mike Pence	554,412	100.00
Total votes		554,412	100.00

2012 Indiana gubernatorial election
Party	Candidate	Votes	%	±%
Republican	Mike Pence / Sue Ellspermann	1,275,424	49.49%	
Democratic	John Gregg / Vi Simpson	1,200,016	46.56%	
Libertarian	Rupert Boneham / Brad Klopfenstein	101,868	3.95%	
No party	Donnie Harold Harris / George Fish (write-in)	21	0%	—
Margin of victory		75,408	2.93%	%
Turnout		2,577,329	56.58%	
Republican hold		Swing		

=== 2016 Republican primary ===
In 2016, Pence ran for a second term as Governor, winning the Republican primary unopposed. However, after being selected by Republican presidential nominee Donald Trump to be his running mate in the 2016 United States presidential election, Pence dropped out. The Indiana Republican Party nominated Lieutenant Governor Eric Holcomb as a replacement.

2016 Indiana Republican gubernatorial primary
Party	Candidate	Votes	%
Republican	Mike Pence (incumbent)	815,699	100
Total votes		815,699	100

== Presidential elections (2016–2024) ==
=== 2016 ===
==== Nomination ====
2016 Republican National Convention, vice presidential tally
Candidate	Votes	%
Mike Pence	_ (Note: Chosen by acclamation.)	100.00
Total votes		100.00

==== General election ====
Electoral college map of the 2016 electione

Electoral results
Presidential candidate	Party	Home state	Popular vote		Electoral vote	Running mate		
Presidential candidate	Party	Home state	Count	Percentage	Electoral vote	Vice-presidential candidate	Home state	Electoral vote
Donald Trump	Republican	New York	62,984,828	46.09%	304 (306)	Mike Pence	Indiana	304 (Note: Pence received 305 electoral votes for vice president, but only 304 as part of the Trump–Pence ticket; one faithless elector from Texas voted for Ron Paul as president instead of Trump, and is recorded separately below.)
Hillary Clinton	Democratic	New York	65,853,514	48.18%	227 (232)	Tim Kaine	Virginia	227
Gary Johnson	Libertarian	New Mexico	4,489,341	3.28%	0	William Weld	Massachusetts	0
Jill Stein	Green	Massachusetts	1,457,218	1.07%	0	Ajamu Baraka	Illinois	0
Evan McMullin	Independent	Utah	731,991	0.54%	0	Mindy Finn	District of Columbia	0
Darrell Castle	Constitution	Tennessee	203,090	0.15%	0	Scott Bradley	Utah	0
Gloria La Riva	Socialism and Liberation	California	74,401	0.05%	0	Eugene Puryear	District of Columbia	0
Tickets that received electoral votes from faithless electors
Bernie Sanders (Note: Received electoral vote(s) from a faithless elector)	Independent	Vermont	111,850 (Note: Candidate received votes as a write-in. The exact numbers of write-in votes have been published for three states: California, New Hampshire, and Vermont.)	0.08%	1 (0)	Elizabeth Warren	Massachusetts	1
John Kasich (Note: Two faithless electors from Texas cast their presidential votes for Ron Paul and John Kasich, respectively. Chris Suprun said he cast his presidential vote for John Kasich and his vice presidential vote for Carly Fiorina. The other faithless elector in Texas, Bill Greene, cast his presidential vote for Ron Paul but cast his vice presidential vote for Mike Pence, as pledged. John Kasich received recorded write-in votes in Alabama, Georgia, Illinois, New Hampshire, North Carolina, Pennsylvania, and Vermont.)	Republican	Ohio	2,684	0.00%	1 (0)	Carly Fiorina	Virginia	1
Ron Paul	Libertarian	Texas	124	0.00%	1 (0)	Mike Pence	Indiana	1
Colin Luther Powell	Republican	Virginia	25	0.00%	3 (0)	Elizabeth Warren	Massachusetts	1
Colin Luther Powell	Republican	Virginia	25	0.00%	3 (0)	Maria Cantwell	Washington	1
Colin Luther Powell	Republican	Virginia	25	0.00%	3 (0)	Susan Collins	Maine	1
Faith Spotted Eagle	Democratic	South Dakota	0	0.00%	1 (0)	Winona LaDuke	Minnesota	1
Other			760,210	0.56%	—	Other		—
Total			136,669,276	100%	538			538
Needed to win					270			270

=== 2020 ===
==== Nomination ====
2020 Republican National Convention, vice presidential tally
Candidate	Votes	%
Mike Pence	_	100.00
Total votes		100.00

==== General election ====
Electoral college map of the 2020 election

2020 United States presidential election
Candidate	Running mate	Party	Popular vote		Electoral vote	
Candidate	Running mate	Party	Votes	%	Votes	%
Joe Biden	Kamala Harris	Democratic	81,286,454	51.25	306	56.88
Donald Trump	Mike Pence	Republican	74,225,926	46.80	232	43.12
Jo Jorgensen	Spike Cohen	Libertarian	1,865,641	1.18	0	0.00
Howie Hawkins	Angela Nicole Walker	Green	406,711	0.26	0	0.00
Others			829,743	0.52		
Total			158,614,475	100.00	538	100.00

=== 2024 Republican primary ===
On June 7, 2023, Pence announced he would seek the Republican nomination in the 2024 Republican Party presidential primaries. In late July, Pence visited Ukraine to meet with President Volodymyr Zelenskyy to speak about the Russian Invasion of Ukraine. In August, Pence participated in the first two 2024 Republican Party presidential debates. He polled poorly and struggled to fundraise. On October 28, he announced he was dropping out of the race saying, "This is not my time."
