= Communion: Finding My Way Back to Faith =

2026 memoir by JD Vance

Communion
- Cover (HarperCollins)
- Author: JD Vance
- Subject: Religion
- Published: June 16, 2026 (HarperCollins)
- Pages: 304
- ISBN: 978-0-06-357501-1

Communion: Finding My Way Back to Faith is a 2026 memoir by the 50th and current vice president of the United States, JD Vance. The book recounts his conversion to Catholicism in 2019, while discussing the role of religion in public life. Published by HarperCollins, it serves as a sequel to Vance's previous book, Hillbilly Elegy. It received largely unfavorable reviews from critics.

== Background ==
In 2019, Vance, then 35 years old, converted to Catholicism. The title of the work, Communion, refers to the Eucharist, a Christian rite that honors the Last Supper. According to the publisher, HarperCollins, Vance started a book on faith in 2022, which he set aside; Communion is an extension of that project.

The cover of the book, which depicts Mt. Zion United Methodist Church, not a Catholic church, attracted coverage. Congregants of the rural church in Elk Creek, Virginia reported no connection to Vance or Catholicism.

Vance had previously described that conversion process in "How I Joined the Resistance," an essay published in The Lamp magazine. Communion contains some identical passages to the essay.

== Contents ==
The Associated Press described the book as a "manifesto for the role of religion in public life." Vance chronicles his journey to Catholicism, after earlier identifying for periods as a Protestant Christian or atheist, while also exploring the role of religion in politics. Explaining his choice to join the Catholic Church, Vance writes: "If the Titanic is going down, I'd rather be on board than hop on a lifeboat."

The book describes meetings between Vance and officials from the Vatican in April 2025. According to Vance, officials refrained from making any substantive remarks about immigration, instead offering "platitudes" and "cliches" about treating migrants humanely. His meeting with Pope Francis was brief due to the leader's ill health; Francis died the following day.

Vance walked back a comment that he made during an appearance on Fox News in 2021 that described Kamala Harris and other Democrats as "a bunch of childless cat ladies" ruining the country. He called the remarks "intentionally (and successfully) provocative rather than illuminating."

== Reception ==
Writing for The Guardian, theologian Rowan Williams called Vance's analysis of social issues "thoughtful", noting its similarity to work by Robert N. Bellah and David Brooks, but said that the book "does nothing to resolve the enigma of what makes the vice president tick." Williams asked how a book can be taken seriously that "ignores the rampant corruption of the Trumpian ruling class, the disgraceful verbal bullying that has become normalised in the president’s online and offline tirades, the recklessly arbitrary foreign policies ... and the murderous brutality of the implementation of new immigration controls."

In a review for The Wall Street Journal, Barton Swaim viewed many of Vance's arguments as muddled or contradictory, describing one section as showing "egregious sloppiness" for its misinterpretation of a paper on parental leave.

Jessica Winter of The New Yorker saw Vance as espousing a peculiar aloofness to Catholicism by hedging on doctrine or policy from the Vatican, while wondering if the book's ambiguity may have been intentional to appeal to evangelicals. Winter also wrote that "[the book] communicates little of spiritual hunger, of crises of faith, of temptation or redemption or awe, or whatever else one might want or expect from a conversion tale."

Matthew Walther's review for The Atlantic drew a similar conclusion, criticizing the book as disconnected from Catholic doctrine. Walther also said Vance shared personal anecdotes related to the books themes, but without convincingly sincere reflection on them. He described the book as a "complete waste," a perspective he extends to ghostwritten political memoirs in general.

In New Humanist, Ralph Jones wrote that the book was "accidentally hilarious" and "rife with internal contradictions." He said that it was difficult to reconcile the "often sensitive, insightful" side of Vance with the person who has "aided and abetted the cruellest, stupidest presidential regime imaginable." Jones stated that the book will leave readers questioning which of Vance's beliefs are sincere or pretended.

Writing for Jacobin, Scott D. Moringiello wrote that the book "barely attempts" to be a spiritual memoir and instead "oscillates between Vance complaining about 'the elites' and offering half-baked policy ideas that show no real engagement with the Roman Catholic social teaching."

== See also ==
- 2026 United States–Holy See rift
- Dawn's Early Light: Taking Back Washington to Save America
- Unhumans
