= Hillbilly Elegy =

2016 memoir by JD Vance

- Author: JD Vance
- Subject: Rural sociology, poverty, family drama
- Published: June 28, 2016 (Harper Press)
- Pages: 264
- Awards: 2017 Audie Award for Nonfiction
- ISBN: 978-0-06-230054-6
- LC Class: HD8073.V37
- Website: www.harpercollins.com/9780062300546/hillbilly-elegy

Hillbilly Elegy: A Memoir of a Family and Culture in Crisis is a 2016 memoir by JD Vance about the Appalachian values of his family from Kentucky and the socioeconomic problems of his hometown of Middletown, Ohio, where his mother's parents moved when they were young. It was adapted into the 2020 film Hillbilly Elegy, directed by Ron Howard and starring Glenn Close and Amy Adams.

Later, Vance progressed in politics, becoming a senator from Ohio in 2023 and the vice president of the United States in 2025.

== Summary ==
Vance describes his upbringing and family background while growing up in Middletown, Ohio, where his mother and her family had moved after World War II from Breathitt County, Kentucky.

Vance states that their Appalachian culture valued traits such as loyalty and love of country despite family violence and verbal abuse. Vance recounts his grandparents' alcoholism as well as his mother's history of drug addictions and failed relationships. Vance's grandparents reconciled and became his guardians. His strict but loving grandmother pushed Vance, who went on to complete undergraduate studies at Ohio State University and earned a Juris Doctor degree from Yale Law School.

Vance raises questions about the responsibility of his family and local people for their misfortunes. Vance suggests that hillbilly culture fosters social disintegration and economic insecurity in Appalachia. He cites a personal experience where, while working as a grocery store cashier, he saw welfare recipients with cell phones when he could not afford one.

Vance's antipathy toward those who seemed to profit from poor behavior while he struggled is presented as a rationale for Appalachia's political swing from voting Democratic to a strong Republican affiliation. Vance tells stories highlighting the lack of work ethic of the local people, including the story of a man who quit his job after expressing dislike over his work hours, and a co-worker with a pregnant girlfriend who skipped work unexcused.

== Publication ==
In July 2016, Hillbilly Elegy was popularized by an interview with Vance in The American Conservative. The volume of requests briefly disabled the website. Halfway through August, The New York Times wrote that the title had remained in the top ten Amazon bestsellers since the interview's publication.

Vance has credited his Yale contract law professor Amy Chua as the "authorial godmother" of the book, as she persuaded him to write the memoir.

== Reception and legacy ==
=== Critical reception ===
The book reached the top of The New York Times best seller list in August 2016 and January 2017.

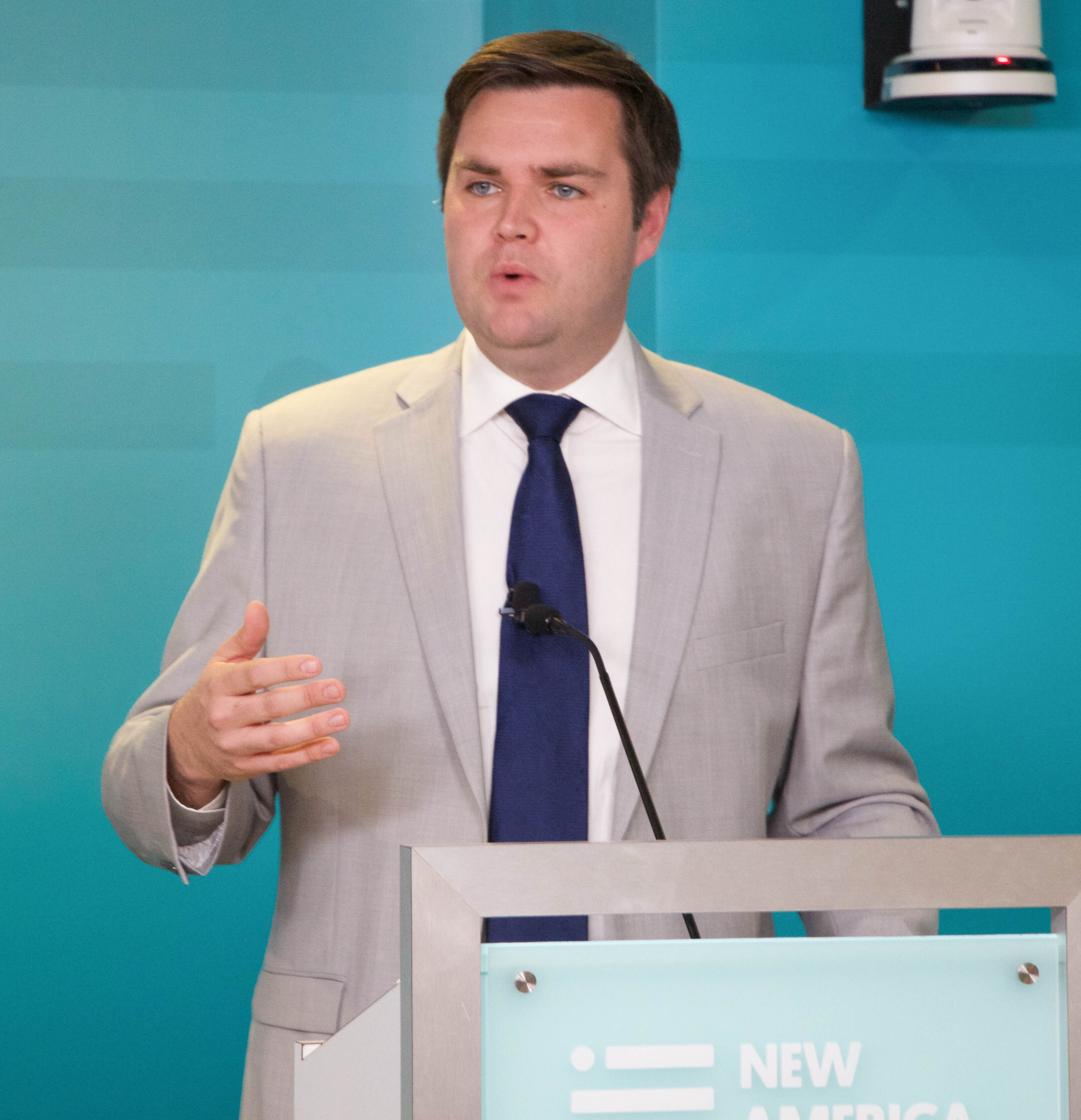
Vance discussed his memoir at an event on childhood poverty held by New America in 2017.

In a positive review in The New York Times, Jennifer Senior wrote that Vance's confrontation of a social taboo was admirable, regardless of whether the reader agreed with his conclusions. She described the book as "a compassionate, discerning sociological analysis of the white underclass that has helped drive the politics of rebellion, particularly the ascent of Donald J. Trump." Senior wrote that Vance's subject is despair, and his argument was more generous in that it blames fatalism and learned helplessness rather than indolence.

A 2017 Brookings Institution report noted that "J. D. Vance's Hillbilly Elegy became a national bestseller for its raw, emotional portrait of growing up in and eventually out of a poor rural community riddled by drug addiction and instability." Vance's account anecdotally confirmed the report's conclusion that family stability is essential to upward mobility.

In an interview with Süddeutsche Zeitung in July 2023, German chancellor Olaf Scholz called the book "a very touching personal story of how a young man with poor starting conditions makes his way." Scholz said the book had moved him to tears, but that he found the positions Vance later took to be "tragic."

The book was positively received by conservatives such as National Review columnist Mona Charen and National Review editor and Slate columnist Reihan Salam. American Conservative contributor and blogger Rod Dreher expressed admiration for Hillbilly Elegy, saying that Vance "draws conclusions... that may be hard for some people to take. Vance has earned the right to make those judgments. This was his life. He speaks with authority that has been extremely hard won." The following month, Dreher posted about his theories about why liberals loved the book. New York Post columnist and editor of Commentary John Podhoretz described the book as among the year's most provocative.

However, other journalists criticized Vance for generalizing too much from his personal upbringing in suburban Ohio. Jared Yates Sexton of Salon criticized Vance for his "damaging rhetoric" and for endorsing policies used to "gut the poor". He argues that Vance "totally discounts the role racism played in the white working class's opposition to President Obama." Sarah Jones of The New Republic mocked Vance as "the false prophet of Blue America," dismissing him as "a flawed guide to this world" and the book as little more than "a list of myths about welfare queens repackaged as a primer on the white working class."

Historian Bob Hutton wrote in Jacobin that Vance's argument relied on circular logic and eugenics, ignored existing scholarship on Appalachian poverty, and was "primarily a work of self-congratulation." Sarah Smarsh with The Guardian noted that "most downtrodden whites are not conservative male Protestants from Appalachia" and called into question Vance's generalizations about the white working class from his personal upbringing.

The book was discussed in an episode of the podcast If Books Could Kill.

=== Reception by Appalachians ===
Many Appalachians appreciated the memoir's recounting of Vance's childhood experiences but protested the book's generalizations of those experiences to Appalachian culture. Some Appalachian critics argued that Vance caricatured Appalachia and relied on existing stereotypes. They blamed the book's popularity for amplifying these stereotypes. Further complaints included that Vance blamed poverty on individuals and their decisions rather than documented systemic and historic issues. Vance's critiques of Appalachian culture included calling many people in the community lazy, and the books' subtitle, "A Memoir of a Family and Culture in Crisis", offended some Appalachian critics with its implied condemnation of Appalachian culture. Other complaints said the book flattened Appalachian culture and erased its diversity.

At the 2018 Appalachian Studies Association conference, Young Appalachian Leaders and Learners (Y'ALL) protested Vance during a panel by turning their chairs from him and singing "Which Side are You On?".

==== Appalachian literary responses ====
Virginia-based historian Elizabeth Catte countered Hillbilly Elegy with What You Are Getting Wrong About Appalachia. Catte believed Vance overly stereotyped Appalachian culture to help himself rise in politics, and saw his characterization of the region as part of a long lineage of American stereotypes about Appalachia. Catte compared the memoir's media influence to images of extreme poverty taken during the 1960s War on Poverty, with both phenomena exerting an outsized impression on American understanding of Appalachia.

Another direct rebuttal came in the form of an anthology, Appalachian Reckoning: A Region Responds to Hillbilly Elegy, edited by Anthony Harkins and Meredith McCarroll. The essays in the volume frequently criticize Vance for making broad generalizations and reproducing myths about poverty. A few essays take Vance's side, and some art is included in the book to provide more diverse representations of Appalachian experience. In the book's foreword, Harkins and McCarroll write:

This is a book born out of frustration. This is a book born out of hope. It attempts to speak for no one and give voice to many. This is a book that could have emerged without ‘Hillbilly Elegy,’ but it was also created in the explicit context of a post-election, post-‘Hillbilly Elegy’ moment. It therefore attempts to respond to those who have felt they understand Appalachia ‘now that they have read Hillbilly Elegy’ and to push back and complicate those understandings.

Author Zane McNeill described how media narratives arising from Hillbilly Elegy felt like they erased the stories of queer Appalachians. McNeill didn't feel the community was represented in literature until the 2018 publication of the Electric Dirt zine. It was produced by the Queer Appalachia collective, and shared writing about queer and trans experiences in the region. Its popularity sparked more works on queer Appalachian studies.

Barbara Kingsolver felt a sense of duty to combat Vance's portrayal of Appalachian life and media stereotypes of the region with a story that she felt was more authentic. As her reaction, she wrote the Pulitzer Prize-winning Demon Copperhead to be a "great Appalachian novel". Kingsolver criticized Hillbilly Elegy as relying on "the same old victim-blaming trope. It was like a hero story: 'I got out of here, I went to Yale. But those lazy people, you know, just don't have ambitions. They don't have brains. That's why they're stuck where they are.'" Kingsolver said that she resented all parts of Hillbilly Elegy, feeling that Vance was not from Appalachia and did not understand the community.

Following Hillbilly Elegy, a surge in publishing from marginalized communities in Appalachia began as an effort to counter stereotypes of the region by sharing a wider range of more nuanced stories. They were motivated by broadening narratives about Appalachia to counter longstanding national stereotypes about the region, which they attributed both to Hillbilly Elegy's recent popularity and widespread biases. Haymarket Books, Hub City Press, West Virginia University Press, and University Press of Kentucky led concerted efforts to publish more diverse writing about the region. University Press of Kentucky's Appalachian Futures series explicitly sought to give "voice to Black, Native, Latinx, Asian, Queer, and other nonwhite or ignored identities within the Appalachian region". Its first book, Tar Hollow Trans, was published in 2023.

=== Relationship to Donald Trump ===
A key reason for Hillbilly Elegy's widespread popularity following its publication in 2016 was its role in explaining Donald Trump's rise to the top of the Republican Party. In particular, it purportedly explains why white, working-class voters became attracted to Trump as a political leader. Vance himself offered commentary on how his book provides perspective on why a voter from the "hillbilly" demographic would support Trump.

Although he does not mention Trump in the book, Vance openly criticized the then presidential candidate while discussing his memoir in a 2016 interview following the book's release. Vance walked these comments back when he joined the 2022 U.S. Senate race in Ohio, and later openly endorsed Trump. In July 2024, Vance was picked by Trump to be his running mate on the Republican ticket for the 2024 U.S. presidential election.

=== Renewed attention ===
After Vance was announced as Trump's running mate in 2024, sales of the book and viewership for the film on Netflix increased dramatically.

On July 15, 2024, the day Trump announced Vance as running mate, and 2 days before he accepted it, an Internet hoax spread from social network Twitter falsely claiming that Hillbilly Elegy described Vance having sexual intercourse with a couch. Internet memes were generated in response, and the viral hoax's spread was amplified after the Associated Press published and promptly deleted a fact-check of it.

== Sequel ==
In 2017, Vance signed an $8 million deal to write a sequel to Hillbilly Elegy. On March 31, 2026, Vance announced Communion: Finding My Way Back to Faith, which centers on Vance's conversion to Catholicism and serves as a sequel to Hillbilly Elegy.

== See also ==
- Political positions of JD Vance
- Communion (Vance book)
- Unhumans
- Dawn's Early Light: Taking Back Washington to Save America
- Hillbilly Highway
- Urban Appalachians
