= Political positions of JD Vance =

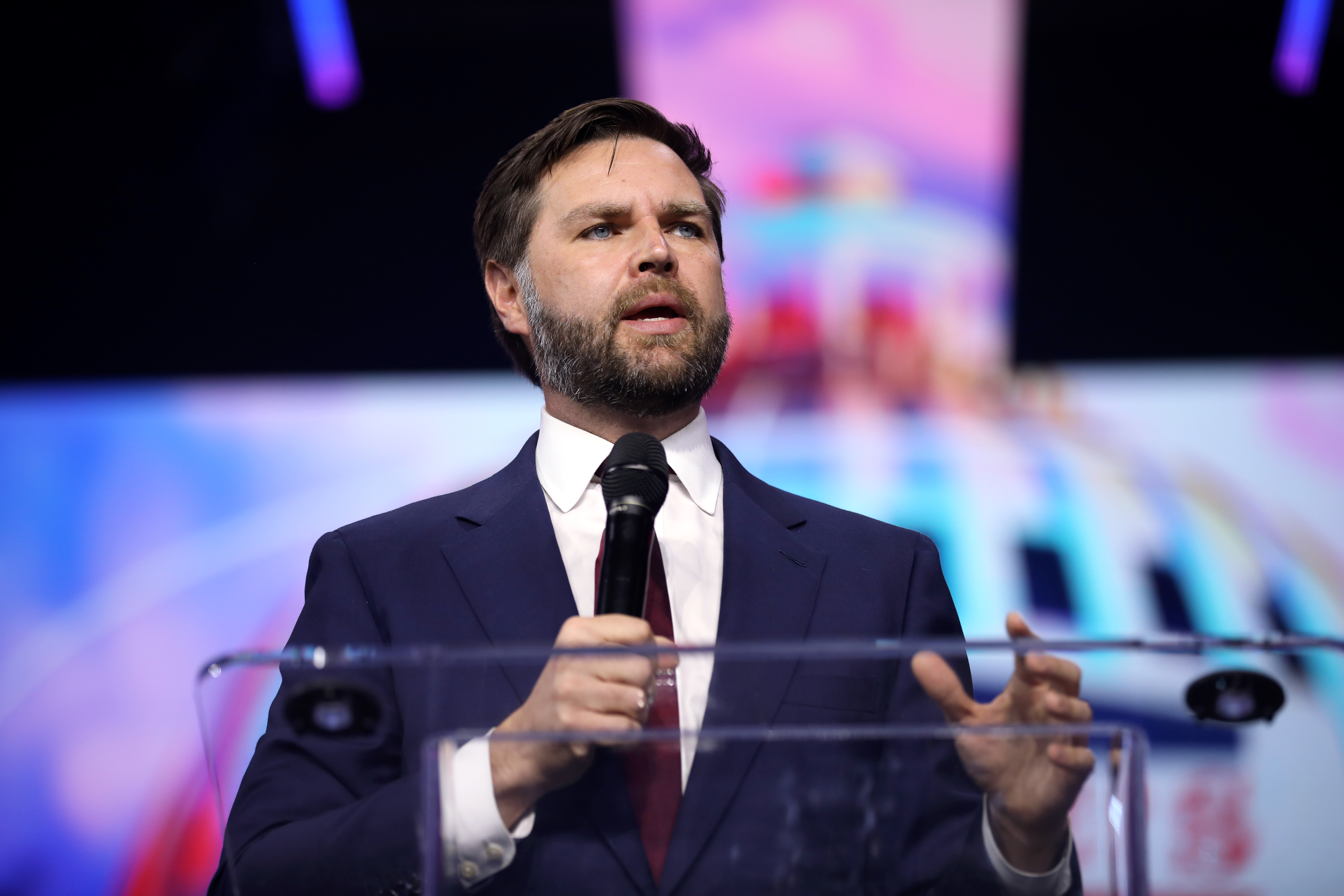
JD Vance speaking at the 2024 People's Convention

The 50th vice president of the United States, JD Vance, has been described as a national conservative, right-wing populist, ultraconservative, and an ideological successor to paleoconservatives such as Pat Buchanan. Vance describes himself, and has been described by others, as a member of the postliberal right. Vance has described himself as having been influenced by Catholic social teaching. He has endorsed books by Kevin Roberts, president of the Heritage Foundation, and far-right conspiracy theorist Jack Posobiec.

On social issues, Vance is considered conservative. He opposes abortion, same-sex marriage, and gun control. He has taken a number of natalist positions. He has repeatedly expressed his belief that childlessness is linked to sociopathy. Vance has repeatedly asserted that parents should have more voting power than non-parents; however, in August 2024, he backtracked from that suggestion. He has proposed federal criminalization of gender-affirming care for minors. He supports Israel in the Gaza war. He opposes continued American military aid to Ukraine during the ongoing Russian invasion and prefers a negotiated peace. Vance has argued that the country's largest and most powerful institutions have united against the right and has called for "a de-woke-ification program". He is critical of universities, which he has called "the enemy". Vance is also critical of both the U.S. Department of Justice (DOJ) and the Federal Bureau of Investigation.

In 2016, Vance was an outspoken critic of Republican presidential nominee Donald Trump, calling him "reprehensible" and himself a "never Trump guy". In 2021, after Vance announced his Senate candidacy, he publicly announced support for Trump, apologizing for his past criticisms of Trump and deleting some of them. That year, Vance advised Trump to fire all civil servants and replace them with Trump supporters. Vance has said that if he had been vice president during the 2020 presidential election, he would not have certified the results. Instead, Vance insisted that some states that Trump lost should have sent pro-Trump electors to Washington so that Congress could decide the election.

== Social issues ==
=== Abortion ===
Vance supported the Supreme Court of the United States overturning of Roe v. Wade in 2022 and opposes abortion. In 2024, he said that abortion laws should be set by the states.

In September 2021, when asked whether abortion laws should include exceptions for rape and incest, Vance said, "two wrong[s] don't make a right." He said he preferred to frame the question as a matter of "whether a child should be allowed to live" rather than as what a woman is "forced" to do, also suggesting that the circumstances of rape and incest were "inconvenient". A month later, he said: "There's something comparable between abortion and slavery and that while the people who obviously suffer the most are those subjected to it, I think it has this morally distorting effect on the entire society." At a 2021 conference hosted by the Claremont Institute, Vance argued that companies support abortion rights because they are "so desperate for cheap labor that they don't want people to parent children".

In January 2022, Vance said: "I certainly would like abortion to be illegal nationally." In the same interview, he brought up a hypothetical situation where "Roe vs. Wade is overruled. Ohio bans abortion … then, you know, every day George Soros sends a 747 to Columbus to load up disproportionately black women to get them to go have abortions in California"; he said he was "pretty sympathetic" to the notion that "some federal response" would be required to stop that situation from happening, as he supported the idea that "Ohio bans abortion in California and the Soroses of the world respect it".

In February 2022, Vance called the "right to life" a priority for conservatives, and said of conservative politicians who are "not willing to stand on that issue, I think it indicates your character is weak and you don't have the fortitude to actually serve the interest of our voters." In an October 2022 debate, Vance said: "I've always believed in reasonable exceptions" to abortion bans. Later, he specified that he supported exceptions for rape, incest, and preserving a mother's life. Also that month, Vance said of abortion: "I'd like it to be primarily a state issue. Ohio is going to want to have a different abortion policy from California, from New York, and I think that's reasonable. I want Ohio to be able to make its own decisions, and I want Ohio's elected legislators to make those decisions. But I think it's fine to sort of set some minimum national standard." In November 2023, Vance said, "We can't give in to the idea that the federal Congress has no role in this matter".

In January 2023, Vance advocated for the U.S. Department of Justice to enforce the Comstock Act of 1873 to ban the mailing of drugs that induce abortion. In June 2024, the Supreme Court at least temporarily preserved access to mifepristone, after which Trump said during a debate that he "agree[d] with their decision" and would not "block" the drug. In July, a week before Vance was announced as Trump's running mate, Vance told NBC's Meet the Press that he likewise supported access to mifepristone.

Vance also signed a letter to Health and Human Services Secretary Xavier Becerra requesting the withdrawal of a privacy rule preventing law enforcement from accessing abortion related health records.

In August 2024, Vance was interviewed by Laura Ingraham, who brought up that suburban women are worried that abortion could be banned nationwide. He responded: "I don't buy that ... I think most suburban women care about the normal things most Americans care about right now." Vance also said that, if Congress passed a national abortion ban, Trump would and should veto it.

During the October 1, 2024 vice-presidential nominees' debate, Vance said he "never supported a national ban" on abortion, despite having said in 2022 that he "certainly would like abortion to be illegal nationally" and pledging during his 2022 Senate campaign to "end abortion".

=== Family, childlessness, and divorce ===
Vance has been called a natalist or pronatalist due to his strong support for the traditional nuclear family, the institution of marriage, and the importance of an active role for the state in encouraging and enabling family-formation and raising the national fertility rate.

In 2019, Vance praised fatherhood for making "relatively driftless" young fathers "rooted and grounded", and praised parenthood for making people "more attached to their communities, to their families, to their country … we think babies are good because we're not sociopaths." In 2020, he expressed a concern that childlessness, "especially in America's leadership ... makes people more sociopathic" and makes the U.S. "a little bit less, less mentally stable [...] you go on Twitter and almost always the people who are most deranged and most psychotic are people who don't have kids at home."

In March 2021, Vance argued that childless Americans should pay more taxes than Americans with children. His rationale for this was to "reward the things that we think are good" and "punish the things that we think are bad." In May 2021, Vance declared that people should "go to war against the anti-child ideology" in the U.S. while scorning "sad, lonely, pathetic" "millennial feminist writers" who focus on the benefits of childlessness and disappointments of parenthood. He mentioned his older sister, who had said: "maybe I should have delayed having kids. Maybe I should have went [sic] to school", to which Vance replied: "you've been a great mom. Your children are happy. They're healthy." Vance blamed "cultural messaging" for making his sister feel "inadequate".

In a July 2021 speech to the Intercollegiate Studies Institute, Vance blamed "the childless left" for America's woes, accusing it of lacking a "physical commitment to the future of this country." He also said: "Many of the most unhappy and most miserable and most angry people in our media are childless adults". The same month, in an interview with Sebastian Gorka, Vance called the Democratic Party a "childless cabal". He praised Hungarian prime minister Viktor Orbán for encouraging married couples to have children and said that parents should "get a bigger say in how democracy functions" than non-parents. He suggested achieving this by allotting "votes to all children in this country, but let's give control over those votes to the parents of the children", with the result that "non-parents don't have as much of a voice as parents", though he later said that this was a "thought experiment" rather than a policy proposal.

External videos
- July 2021 interview in which Vance first used the phrase "childless cat ladies"

Later that month, Vance told Fox News that the U.S. was being "effectively run … by a bunch of childless cat ladies who are miserable at their own lives and the choices that they've made, and so they wanna make the rest of the country miserable", citing Democratic politicians Kamala Harris, Pete Buttigieg and Alexandria Ocasio-Cortez. He lamented that "we've turned our country over to people who don't really have a direct stake in it". Since 2021, this position has been met with criticism and support. In August 2021, Vance asked for political donations citing the issue of "radical childless leaders", saying the U.S. was "dominated by childless sociopaths" and childless people "don't have a direct stake in this country". In July 2024, he called his earlier "childless cat ladies" remark "sarcastic" but "true": "I've got nothing against cats … I'm making an argument that our entire society has become skeptical and even hateful towards the idea of having kids".

At a discussion organized by the Center for Christian Virtue in October 2021, Vance said that "many of the leaders of the left" are "people without kids trying to brainwash the minds of our children, that really disorients me and disturbs me ... Randi Weingarten, who's the head of the most powerful teachers' union in the country—she doesn't have a single child. If she wants to brainwash and destroy the minds of children, she should have some of her own and leave ours the hell alone." Weingarten has two stepchildren. Vance made similar remarks in an interview with Breitbart News Daily that month, singling out "next-generation leaders" of the left, like Kamala Harris, Cory Booker, and Alexandria Ocasio-Cortez, as people who have no children and "want to take our kids and brainwash them so that their ideas continue to exist in the next generation".

In September 2021, while speaking at Pacifica Christian High School in California, Vance discussed divorces being more prevalent compared to generations ago:

This is one of the great tricks that I think the sexual revolution pulled on the American populace, which is the idea that, like, "well, OK, these marriages were fundamentally—you know, they were maybe even violent, but certainly they were unhappy. And so getting rid of them and making it easier for people to shift spouses like they change their underwear, that's going to make people happier in the long term. ... And maybe it worked out for the moms and dads, though I'm skeptical. But it really didn't work out for the kids of those marriages."

Vice alleged that Vance "seemed to suggest that in some cases, 'even violent' marriages should continue." In response to Vice, Vance said that rates of domestic violence had "skyrocketed" in recent years due to what he called "modern society's war on families", although in recent decades, rates of domestic violence have decreased. A strategist for Vance called Vice's characterization "extremely dishonest" and said it was "preposterous" to claim that Vance supports people staying in abusive relationships given that he was himself "the victim of domestic abuse when he was a kid".

Vance holds views critical of non-traditional working roles for women. In a podcast published in September 2021, Vance asserted that it is "a path to misery" for women to "spend 90 hours a week working in a cubicle at McKinsey instead of starting a family and having children". In 2022, he wrote: "If your worldview tells you that it's bad for women to become mothers but liberating for them to work 90 hours a week in a cubicle at the New York Times or Goldman Sachs, you've been had." In April 2021, Vance criticized the Biden administration's American Families Plan proposal for childcare to assist working parents, saying: "'Universal day care' is class war against normal people", as it "is a massive subsidy to the lifestyle preferences of the affluent over the preferences of the middle and working class."

In a 2020 interview, while Vance was discussing how his wife's parents helped raise Vance's eldest son and how that benefited the son, the interviewer Eric Weinstein said: "That's the whole purpose of the postmenopausal female, in theory", to which Vance responded, "Yes." In August 2024, when Vance's comments drew media attention, his spokeswoman said that Vance had wrongly assumed that the interviewer said: "That's the whole purpose of spending time with grandparents", and that Vance did not agree with the interviewer now.

At the 2021 National Conservative Conference, Vance said that pornography was one factor reducing the number of marriages and births in the U.S.; he then stressed that Americans had "made a political choice that the freedom to consume pornography was more important than the public goods, like marriage and family and happiness ... and we shouldn't shy away from the fact that we can make new choices in the future." In an August 2021 interview with Crisis Magazine, Vance said he wanted to ban pornography, adding, "porn, abortion have basically created a lonely, isolated generation that isn't getting married, they're not having families, and they're actually not even totally sure how to interact with each other".

In an August 2024 interview on Face The Nation, Vance said he supported increasing the child tax credit from $2,000 per child up to $5,000 per child, departing from his Senate Republican colleagues, who had blocked an expanded child tax credit in the Senate two weeks earlier. In September, he said that the high costs of childcare might be addressed by getting help from extended family and reducing certification requirements.

=== Gun control ===
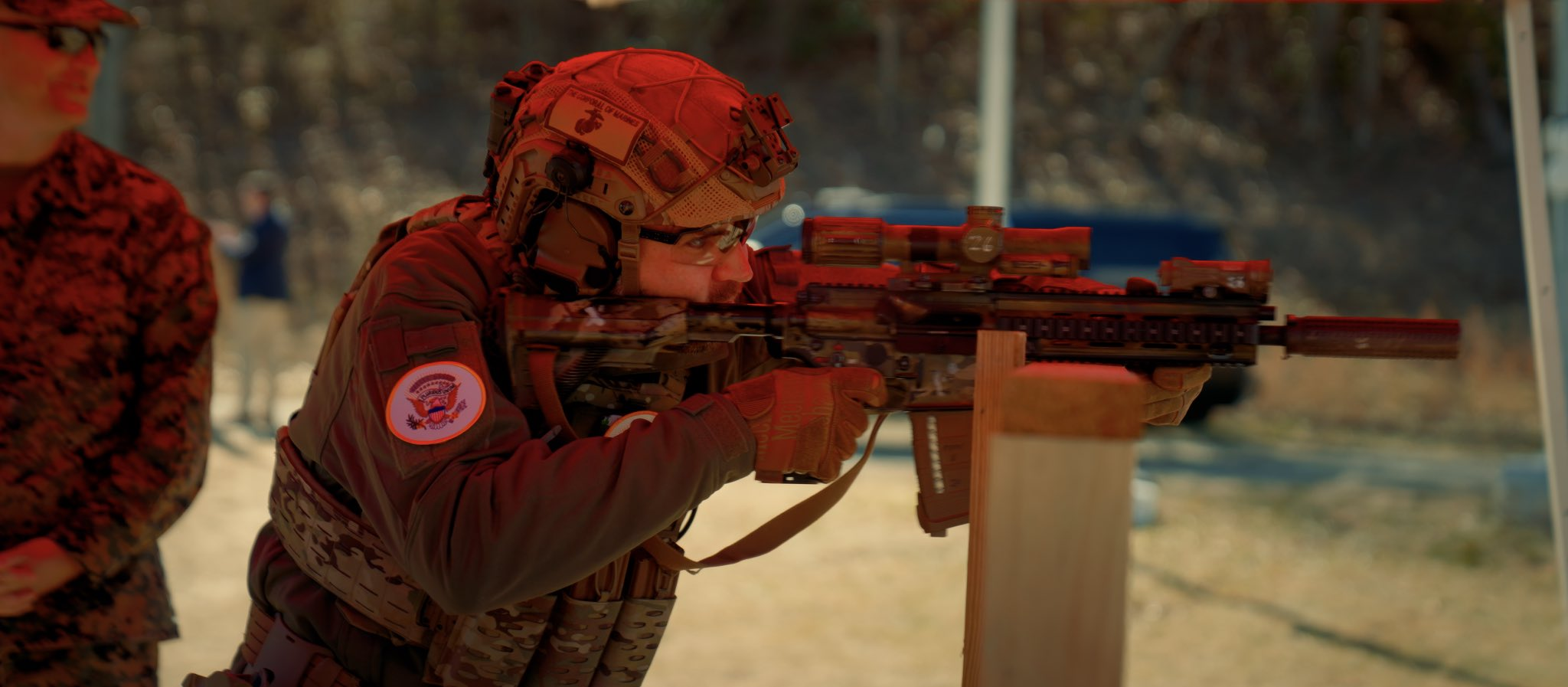
Vance shooting an M27 Infantry Automatic Rifle at Marine Corps Base Quantico, March 2025

Vance has called himself "a big pro-Second Amendment guy". In 2018, he argued for the need to find "the right balance" between protecting people and Second Amendment rights, adding that he worried that people might "sacrifice the Second Amendment process" when trying to address gun violence.

In a debate during his 2022 Senate campaign, Vance said that many gun control measures infringe on people's rights without making them safer, and that the combination of "mak[ing] police terrified of doing their job" and "let[ting] a lot of violent career criminals out of prison" was the driver of violent crime. During that same campaign, he indicated on a candidate survey from the American Firearms Association and Ohio Gun Owners that he supported abolishing the Bureau of Alcohol, Tobacco, Firearms and Explosives; repealing the National Firearms Act; repealing the Gun-Free Schools Act; passing a Second Amendment Preservation Act introduced by Representative Marjorie Taylor Greene; and establishing a national stand-your-ground law. He also indicated that he opposed laws that require background checks for private sales; laws that ban some semi-automatic weapons, including AR-15s; red flag laws; and the Bipartisan Safer Communities Act.

Some of Vance's positions may have shifted. In 2018, he said that "people who are clearly mentally unstable … should not be getting firearms". On the 2022 candidate survey, he opposed allowing judges, psychiatrists, and others to determine that someone should be disarmed because they were "mentally defective".

In 2024, he called legislation to ban bump stocks "a huge distraction ... aimed at a PR problem".

In September 2024, during a campaign event held the day after a mass shooting at a high school in Georgia, Vance said that school shootings are "a fact of life" and that they would not be prevented by stricter gun laws, instead calling for more security in schools.

=== Immigration and border security ===
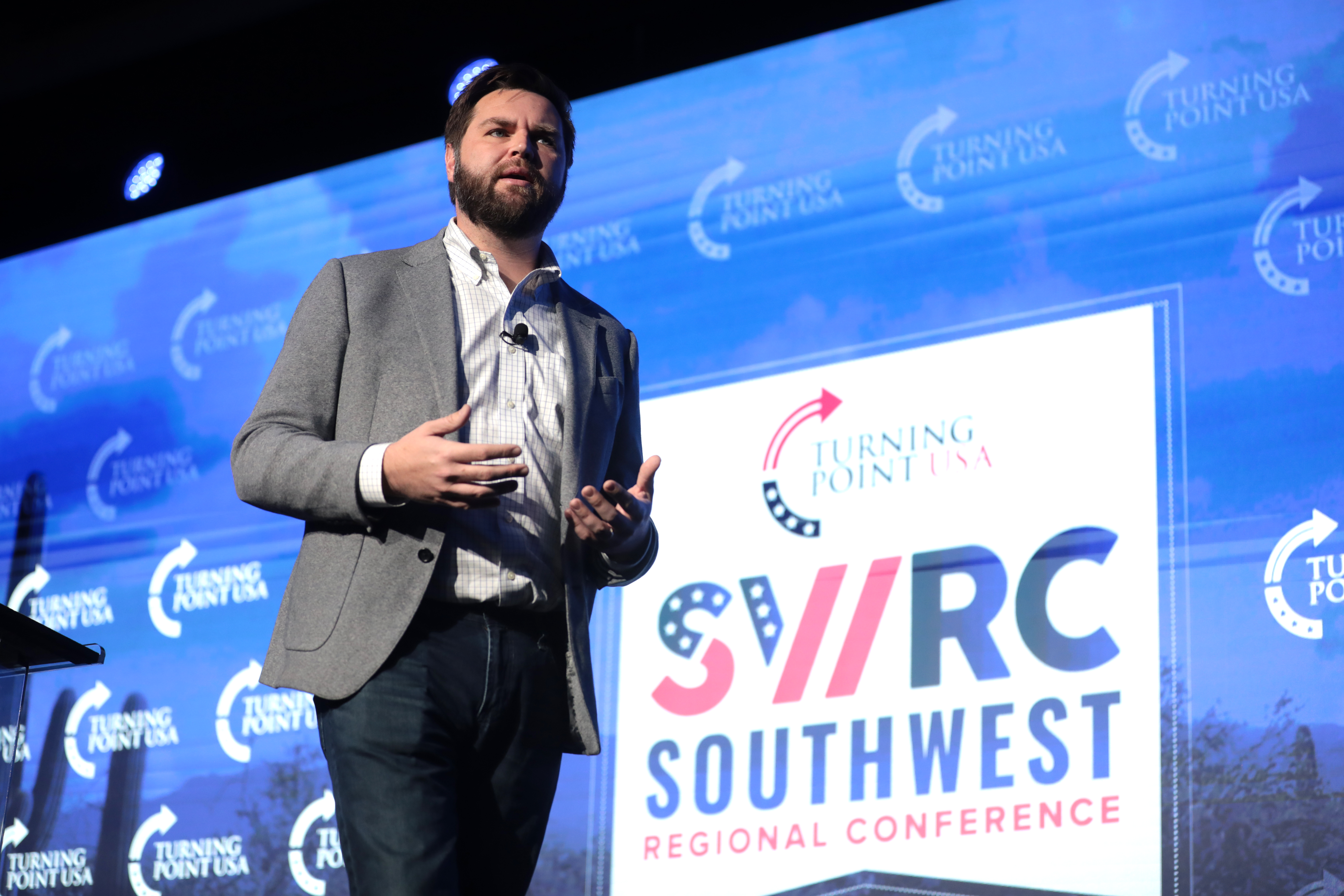
Vance at the 2021 Southwest Regional Conference hosted by Turning Point USA

When Vance was a law student in 2012, he contributed a post to a blog run by his former professor in which he criticized the Republican Party's immigration policies, writing that conservatives "mistrust the government to efficiently administer business loans and regulate our food supply, yet we allegedly believe that it can deport millions of unregistered aliens." The post, which also criticized Republicans for failing to attract "minority voters for simple and obvious reasons: their policy proposals are tired, unoriginal, or openly hostile to non-whites", was taken down upon Vance's request in 2016.

Vance has argued that failing to secure the United States' southern border has fueled the U.S. opioid epidemic by enabling illegal immigration and drug trafficking into the country, "orphaning an entire generation of kids". He is a critic of mass immigration, saying it drives down working-class Americans' wages, increases house prices, and increases strain on social security. He opposes granting legal amnesty to illegal immigrants in the United States and argues that corporations use illegal immigration as a source of cheap labor to undercut the domestic American labor market.

Vance once admonished Trump for demonizing immigrants but has repeatedly called the effects of illegal immigration "dirty". In a 2021 podcast with Jack Murphy, he criticized the earlier "massive wave of Italian, Irish, and German immigration", saying, "You had higher crime rates, you had these ethnic enclaves, you had inter-ethnic conflict in the country where you really hadn't had that before." Vance has supported Trump's proposal for a wall along the southern border and rejected the idea that supporters of the wall are racist. He has proposed spending $3 billion to finish the wall.

During Vance's 2022 Senate run, his general-election opponent, U.S. Representative Tim Ryan, accused Vance of supporting the Great Replacement conspiracy theory, noting that Vance had told Tucker Carlson that Democrats "have decided that they can't win reelection in 2022 unless they bring a large number of new voters to replace the voters that are already here." Vance called Ryan's statement "slander" and said he was not racist, citing his biracial children. During the same campaign, Vance falsely suggested that President Biden was flooding Ohio with illegal drugs "to kill a bunch of MAGA voters", saying, "It does look intentional". In his 2024 campaign speeches, Vance again made Great Replacement theory claims.

In 2023, Vance introduced a bill that would make English the United States' official language.

In September 2024, Vance falsely said "Haitian illegal immigrants" were "draining social services and generally causing chaos all over Springfield, Ohio. Reports now show that people have had their pets abducted and eaten by people who shouldn't be in this country". Both the Springfield city manager and the Springfield police responded that "there have been no credible reports or specific claims of pets being harmed, injured or abused by individuals within the immigrant community". Springfield authorities also said, "Haitian immigrants are here legally, under the Immigration Parole Program". Vance then said that it was "possible, of course, that all of these rumors will turn out to be false", but also told his supporters: "Keep the cat memes flowing."

After Vance's false claim about Haitians eating pets was disputed, he said: "Do you know what’s confirmed? That a child was murdered by a Haitian migrant who had no right to be here." The child's father responded: "My son, Aiden Clark, was not murdered. He was accidentally killed by an immigrant from Haiti." Aiden died in an accidental vehicular collision. His father accused "morally bankrupt politicians ... JD Vance and Donald Trump" of using Aiden's "death for political gain", saying "This needs to stop now", and wishing that "the incessant group of hate-spewing people would leave us alone". Vance also alleged a "massive rise in communicable diseases" in Springfield, but Clark County's health commissioner reported having "not seen a substantial increase in all reportable communicable diseases" and that non-COVID reportable communicable diseases were lower in 2023 than anytime since 2016.

Later that month, Vance promoted conservative activist Christopher Rufo's false allegation that African migrants were eating cats in Dayton, Ohio, and criticized Kamala Harris and the media, calling the allegation "another 'debunked' story that turned out to have merit". The allegation was based on an August 2023 video of skinned animals being grilled, which drew comments that the animals resembled chickens. Dayton police responded, "there is no evidence to even remotely suggest that any group, including our immigrant community, is engaged in eating pets". Dayton Mayor Jeffrey Mims reported "absolutely zero reports of this type of activity". Vance continued to defend his false claim that Haitian migrants eat cats, saying he was willing "to create stories so that the American media actually pays attention … we're creating a story, meaning we're creating the American media focusing on it." Although many Haitian migrants were legal immigrants with temporary protected status, Vance said that since the Biden administration's "border policy [is] a disgrace … I'm still going to call [the migrants] illegal aliens."

=== LGBTQ rights and gender roles ===
Vance opposes the Respect for Marriage Act, which recognized same-sex marriage at the federal level. He said: "I believe that marriage is between one man and one woman, but I don't think the gay marriage issue is alive right now. I'm not one of these guys who's looking to try to take people's families and rip them apart."

Vance proposed a bill that would make gender-affirming surgery for minors a federal felony and block taxpayer funds from being used for it, saying, "Under no circumstances should doctors be allowed to perform these gruesome, irreversible operations on underage children."

Vance took issue with a plan to ask gender identity questions on the Census Bureau's American Community Survey. He introduced the "Passport Sanity Act", a bill to prevent U.S. passports from including an X designation for unspecified gender. He has also called LGBTQ people "groomers".

In a podcast published in September 2021, Vance said that "pursuing racial or gender equity" as a "value system leads to misery", and that if someone becomes a "miserable person who can't have kids because [she] already passed the biological period when it was possible", then she will "project … racial and gender sensitivities" onto others "to make more people think like that". Vance added that "traditional masculine traits are now actively suppressed from childhood all the way through adulthood", saying that boys who fight imaginary monsters "become proud men who defend their homes" while "soy boys who want to feed the monsters" would not defend the United States.

== Economic policy ==
Vance delivers remarks about globalization at the American Dynamism Summit; March 18, 2025.

Vance's economic views have been described as "economic populism" and sometimes "economic nationalism". This view has elements of protectionism, particularly with regard to re-shoring of American industry, especially manufacturing, and protecting American jobs more generally. Vance has also expressed openness to a weaker U.S. dollar as a reserve currency, in order for American exports to be more competitive with other markets. His economic views are considered unorthodox in the Republican Party. He supports tariffs and antitrust policy. His open support for striking auto workers, in particular, surprised many in the party. While Vance has indicated opposition to tax increases overall, he supports increases for certain taxes on university endowments, corporate mergers, and large multinationals. He supports increasing the minimum wage and is highly skeptical of the economic and social contributions of large corporations.

Vance has expressed concern that large tech companies have too much influence in politics and the flow of information and has called to "break up" Google, as well as implying he believes Meta should be split up. He has said that Federal Trade Commission (FTC) chair Lina Khan is "doing a pretty good job", citing her antitrust enforcement against tech firms. Vance and Senator Sheldon Whitehouse introduced the Stop Subsidizing Giant Mergers Act, which would end tax-free treatment for corporate mergers and acquisitions of companies above a certain threshold.

In September 2024, Vance visited a Reading, Pennsylvania supermarket, where he complained that "a dozen eggs will cost you around $4" and blamed Kamala Harris for it. Video of Vance's visit showed that the store's price tag for a dozen eggs was $2.99.

Vance in May 2025 defended the tariffs in the second Trump administration as necessary to promote "self-reliance" for the American economy, as Vance specifically questioned "American moms and dads", and said: "if your country goes to war and your son or daughter is sent off to fight — would you like to know that the weapons that they have are good American-made stuff, not made by a foreign adversary."

=== Labor unions ===
Vance has regularly framed himself as a union ally, even going so far as to explicitly support labor in the 2023 United Auto Workers strike, which many in his party criticized. Despite this, his legislative record has been criticized by some union leaders. Vance also opposes the PRO Act, which expands protections related to employees' rights to organize and collectively bargain, instead voicing support for proposals by the conservative group American Compass, which includes workers' councils and sectoral bargaining. Based on his voting record in the Senate, the AFL-CIO has scored him at 0% on its Legislative Scorecard. On the other hand, Teamsters President Sean O'Brien has praised Vance and other Republicans for "listening to unions and standing up to corporations", for which O'Brien was criticized by other union leaders, including from within the AFL-CIO and the Teamsters union itself. Vance has criticized "right-to-work" anti-trade union laws.

Vance's brief tenure in the Senate has not engendered much confidence in labor advocates. AFL-CIO president and Democratic Party lobbyist Liz Shuler has said: "A Trump–Vance administration would be a dream for corporate CEOs but a nightmare for workers. Sen. JD Vance likes to pose as a union supporter on the picket line, but his record proves to be a sham. He has introduced legislation to allow bosses to bypass their workers' unions with phony corporate-run unions, disparaged striking UAW members while collecting hefty donations from one of the major auto companies, and opposed the landmark Protecting the Right to Organize (PRO) Act, which would end union-busting 'right to work' laws and make it easier for workers to form unions and win strong contracts."

== Foreign policy ==
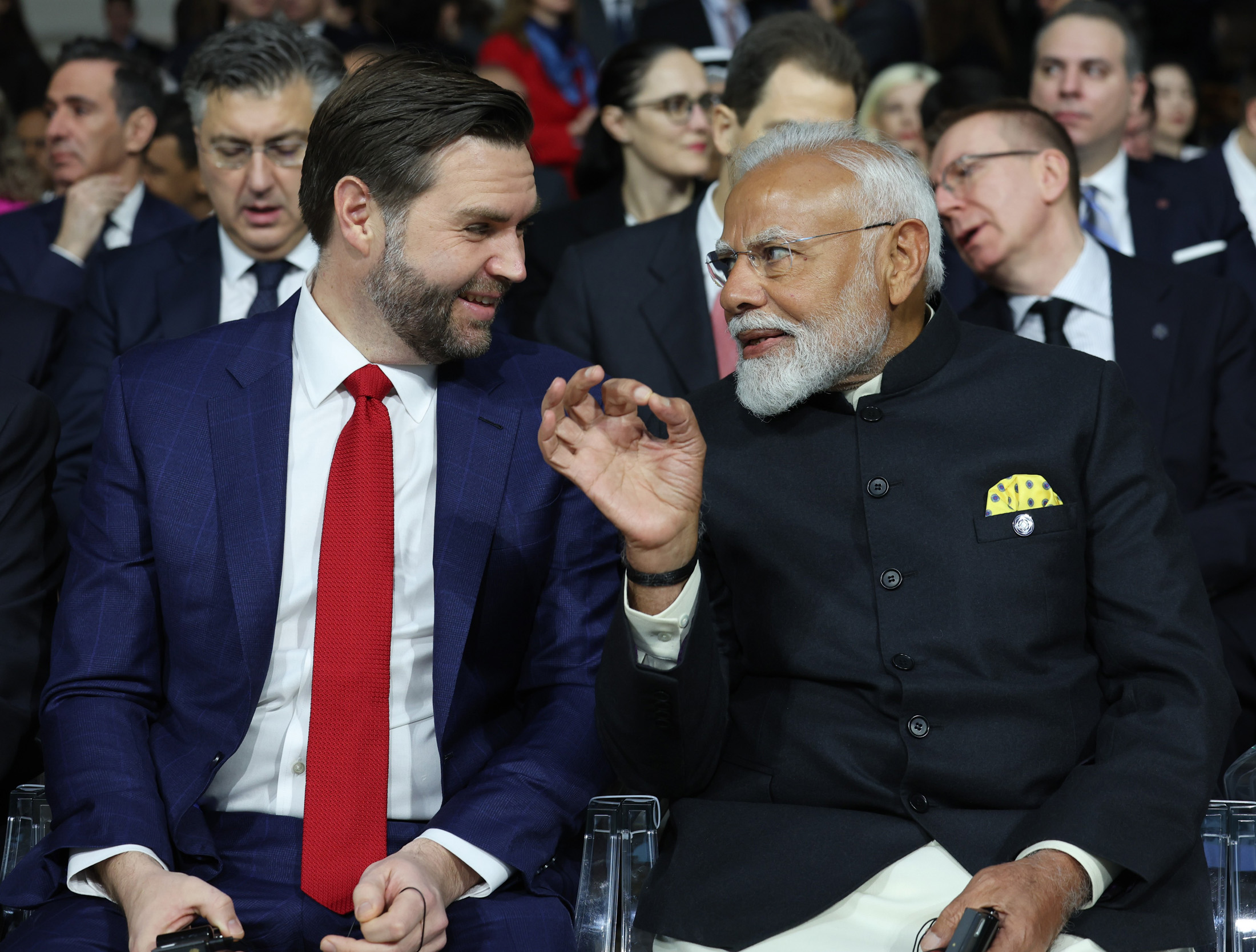
Vance with Indian prime minister Narendra Modi in Paris, 2025

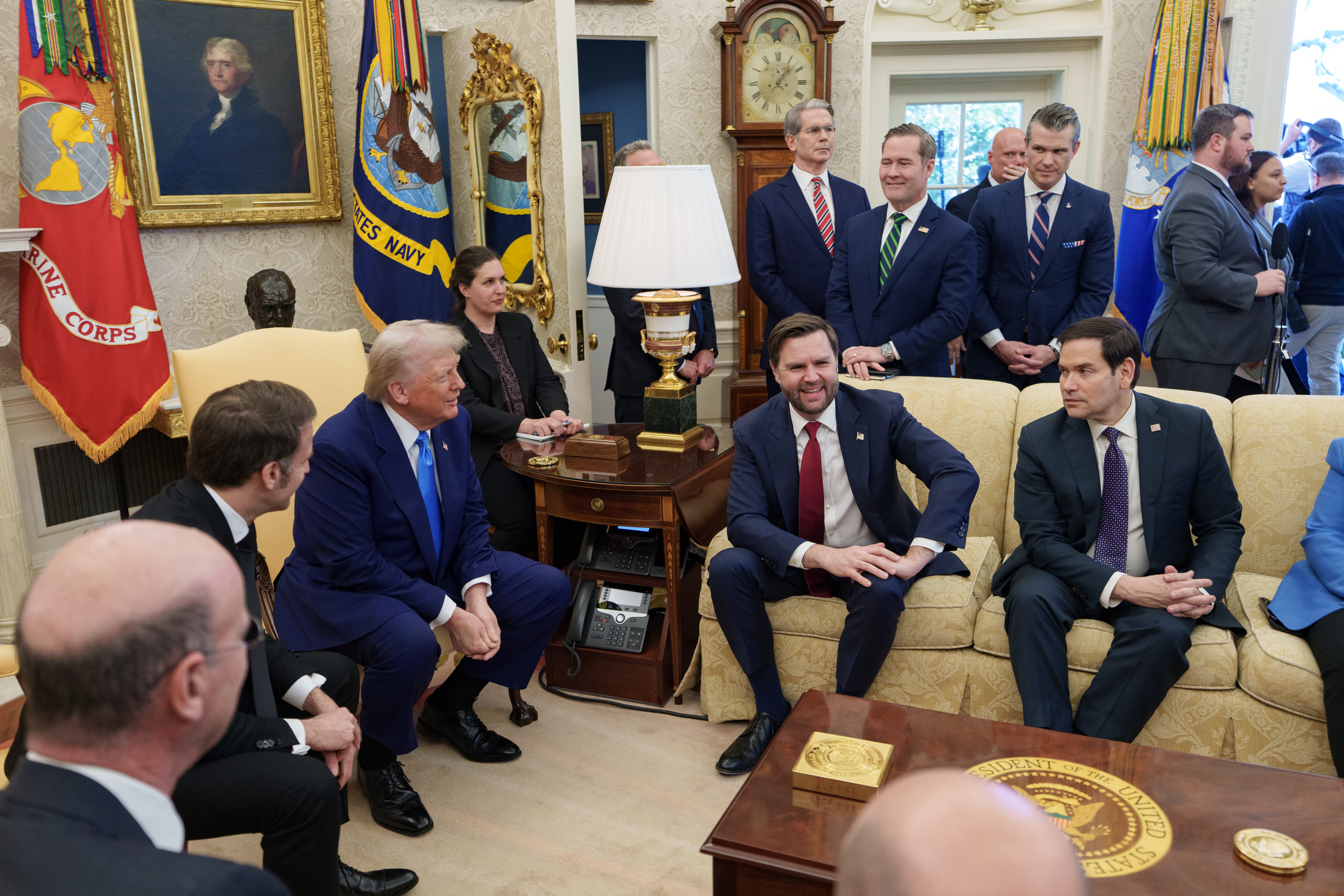
Vance and President Trump with French president Emmanuel Macron on February 24, 2025

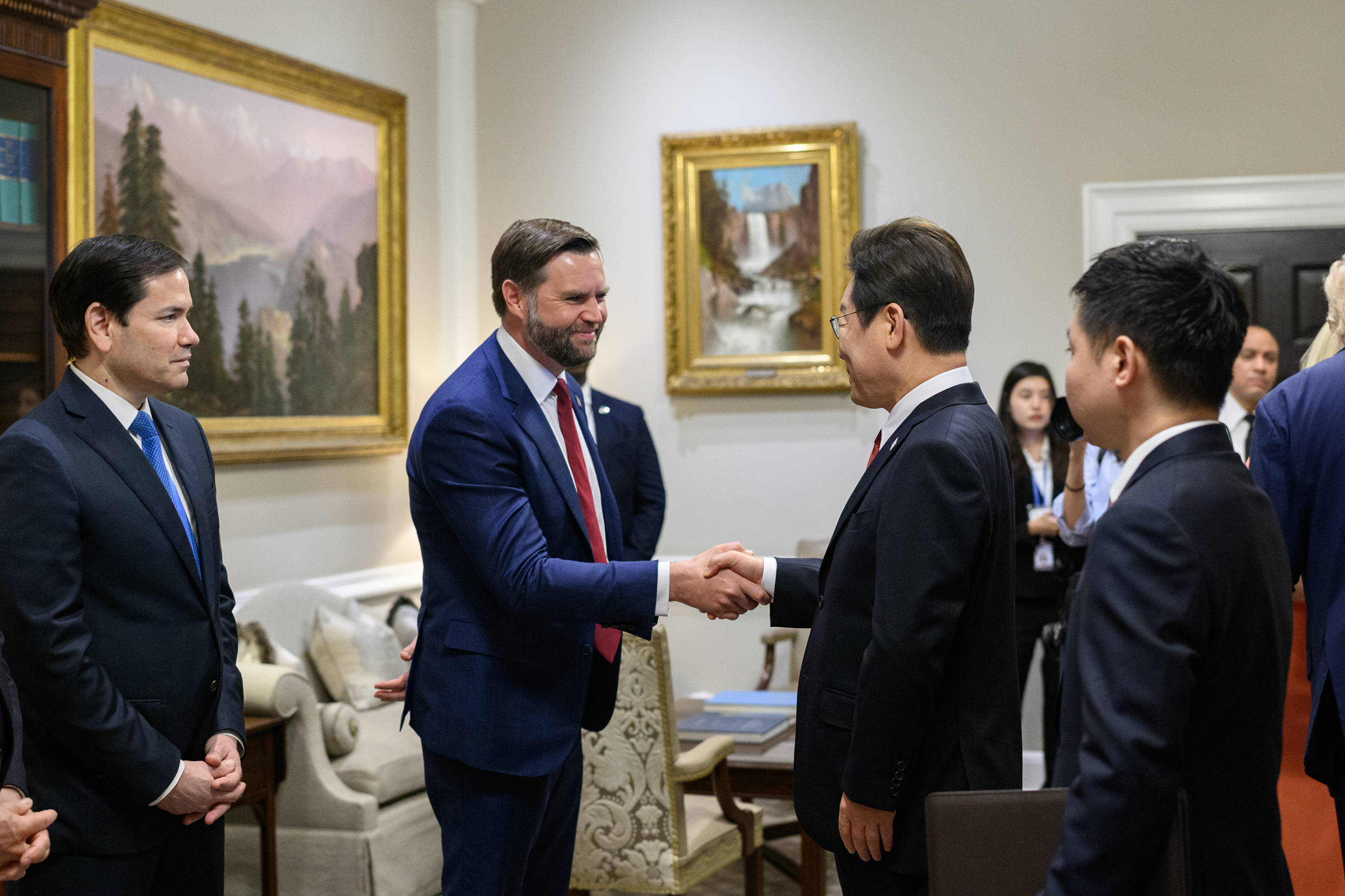
Vance greets South Korean President Lee Jae Myung in the Oval Office of the White House; August 25, 2025

Vance has been called an isolationist, but he supports Israel and is considered a realist. He is known to consider China to be America's most serious national security threat, a view broadly aligned with Republican national security professional Elbridge Colby. At the 2024 Munich Security Conference, Vance said the U.S. did not want to pull out of the North Atlantic Treaty Organization (NATO), but argued the U.S. should shift its focus to East Asia, and that certain European and NATO member countries were not spending enough for their own security.

Vance in April 2025 bemoaned that Europe was "the permanent security vassal of the United States", and further commented that "if the Europeans had been a little more independent [from the United States], and a little more willing to stand up, then maybe we could have saved the entire world from the strategic disaster that was the American-led invasion of Iraq."

=== Afghanistan ===
In the aftermath of the U.S. withdrawal from Afghanistan in 2021, amid a rift among Republicans over whether to admit Afghans who aided the U.S. during the war, Vance said, "We're actually prioritizing Afghan refugees more than we're prioritizing our own citizens."

In a podcast published in September 2021, Vance questioned why "every single [Afghan] person that's coming in" to the U.S. is "a translator and interpreter", adding, "a lot of the [Afghan] interpreters who said they were helping [American forces] were actively helping terrorists plant roadside bombs, knowing our routes". He gave no evidence for that claim, then said: "The idea that every person in Afghanistan, even those who said they were helping us, are actually good people is a total joke."

=== China ===
Vance shaking hands with Chinese leader Xi Jinping during his state visit to the United States, September 24, 2026

Vance has called China "the biggest threat" to the U.S. and has argued that the war in Ukraine is distracting the U.S. from focusing on the threat from China. He believes that China is the source of many American problems. He has said that the U.S. is "flooded with cheap Chinese goods, with cheap foreign labor and, in the decades to come, deadly Chinese fentanyl".

At the Munich Security Conference in 2024, Vance said U.S. foreign policy should pivot from Europe to East Asia: "The United States has to focus more on East Asia. That is going to be the future of U.S. foreign policy for the next 40 years, and Europe has to wake up to that fact."

=== Germany ===
In December 2024, responding to a post by Foundation for Defense of Democracies fellow Ivana Stradner criticizing Elon Musk's support for the far-right Alternative for Germany (AfD) party, Vance sarcastically replied by saying "It’s so dangerous for people to control their borders. So so dangerous. The dangerous level is off the charts" and continued by saying "I wonder how much money this person’s employer gets from the American taxpayer?" In January 2025, he said that while he is "not endorsing a party in the German elections", he said an article by Musk titled Only the AfD Can Save Germany was "interesting". He also claimed while American media "slanders AfD as Nazi-lite", the party "is most popular in the same areas of Germany that were most resistant to the Nazis."

=== Israel ===
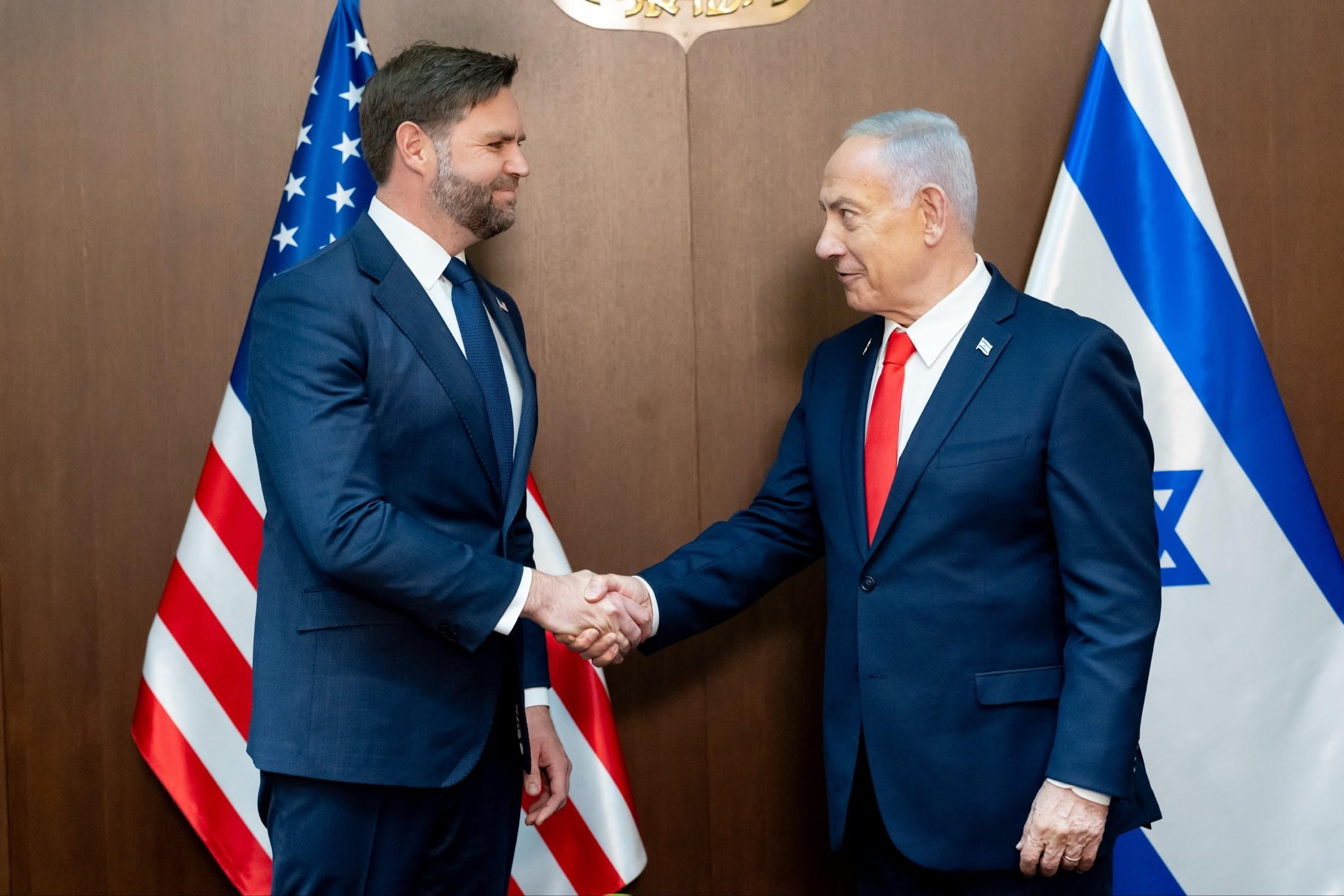
Vance meeting with Prime Minister Benjamin Netanyahu

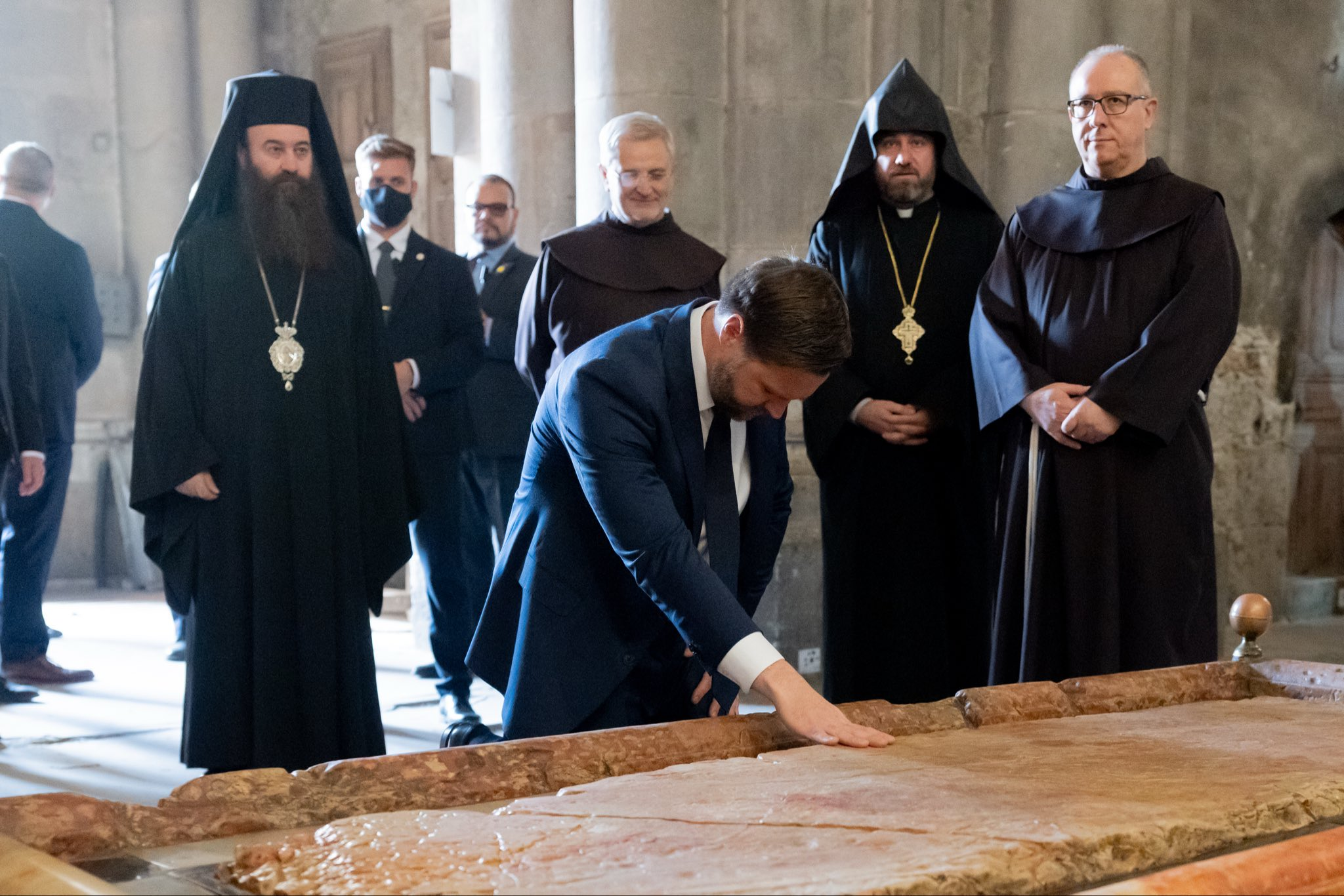
Vance visiting the Church of the Holy Sepulchre, October 2025

Vance is a strong supporter of Israel and has said "culturally, morally, politically, it is a real ally in the sense that we're not just sort of sharing interests, we're actually sharing common values."

Vance has been called a "steadfast supporter of Israel throughout the country's war in Gaza". He supports U.S. funding Israel in the Gaza war. He has said that Israel should win and end the war in Gaza "as quickly as possible" to enable the "Israelis and the Sunni Arab states" to form a united front against Iran. Vance criticized the Biden administration for allegedly 'depriving the Israelis of the precision-guided weapons' they need, and that Hamas bears full responsibility for all civilian deaths. He criticized Biden in April 2024 for "micromanaging" Israeli actions in the war, saying, "you've got to, first of all, enable Israel to actually finish the job".

Vance repeated his criticism of the Biden administration in July 2024, saying: "Number one, you want Israel to get this war over and as quickly as possible because the longer it goes on, the harder their situation becomes. But second, after the war you want to reinvigorate that peace process between Israel, Saudi Arabia, the Jordanians, and so forth". More broadly, he has said, "We want the Israelis and the Sunnis to police their own region of the world."

In an October 2024 interview, Vance said: "Israel has the right to defend itself, but America's interest is sometimes going to be distinct. Sometimes we're going to have overlapping interests and sometimes we're going to have distinct interests. And our interest, I think, very much is in not going to war with Iran."

=== Iran ===
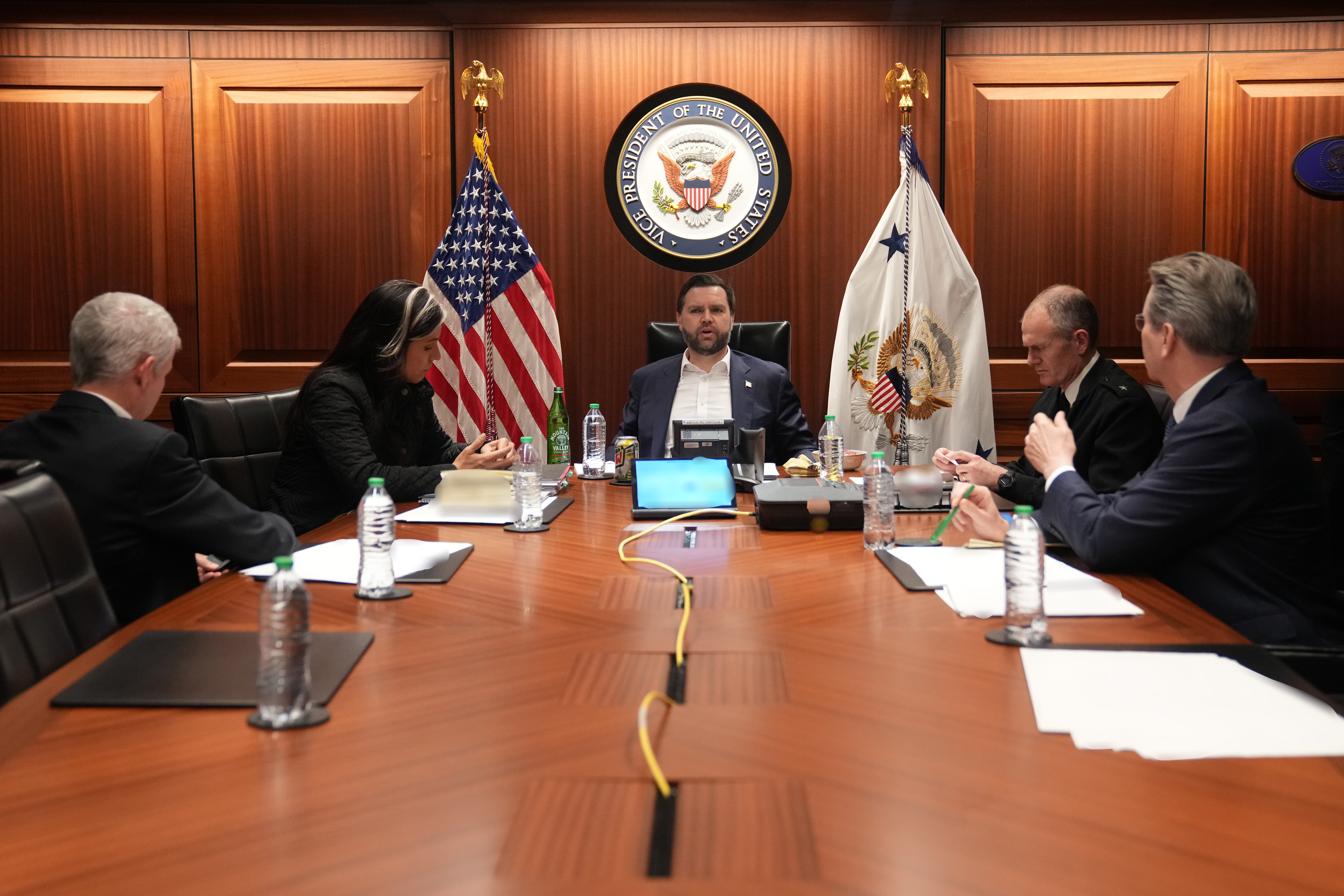
Vance with cabinet members in the Situation Room during the 2026 airstrikes on Iran

When asked in October 2023 whether he would support military action against Iran after militias allegedly connected to Iran attacked U.S. troops, Vance said it would be a "mistake", citing concern about significant escalation. After his nomination as Trump's running mate, Vance praised the 2020 assassination of Iranian general Qasem Soleimani, adding: "If you're gonna punch the Iranians, punch them hard."

Vance said about the 2025 United States strikes on Iranian nuclear sites:

I certainly empathize with Americans who are exhausted after 25 years of foreign entanglements in the Middle East. I understand the concern, but the difference is that back then we had dumb presidents and now we have a president who actually knows how to accomplish America's national security objectives. So this is not going to be some long drawn out thing. We've got in, we've done the job of setting their nuclear program back.

Before the 2026 Iran war Vance defended striking Iran. Vance has also supported the war after it began, contradicting his earlier opposition to war.

=== Iraq ===
In a 2024 speech, Vance said that "in 2003, I made the mistake of supporting the Iraq War", which he had served in as a combat correspondent in the Marine Corps, but that he later realized "that I had been lied to that the promises of the foreign policy establishment were a complete joke."

=== Russo–Ukrainian War ===
In a 2022 interview with Steve Bannon days before the Russian invasion of Ukraine, Vance said, "I don't really care what happens to Ukraine one way or the other. I do care about the fact that in my community right now the leading cause of death among 18- to 45-year-olds is Mexican fentanyl that's coming across the southern border." Vance is a vocal critic of U.S. military aid to Ukraine in the ongoing Russo–Ukrainian War and has faced bipartisan criticism for that view. In February 2024, he said, "Given the realities that we face, the very real constraints in munitions and [Ukraine's] manpower, what is reasonable to accomplish and when do we actually think we're going to accomplish it? And my argument is, look, I think what's reasonable to accomplish is some negotiated peace."

In April 2024, Vance voted against an aid package for Ukraine; in a New York Times essay, he wrote that he remained "opposed to virtually any proposal for the United States to continue funding this war" and argued that U.S. aid would not change the trajectory of the war. He argues that Ukraine should adopt a "defensive strategy" to "preserve its precious military manpower, stop the bleeding and provide time for negotiations to commence"; that the U.S. and Ukraine must "accept that Mr. Zelensky's stated goal for the war—a return to 1991 boundaries—is fantastical"; and that "Ukraine is going to have to cede some territory to the Russians".

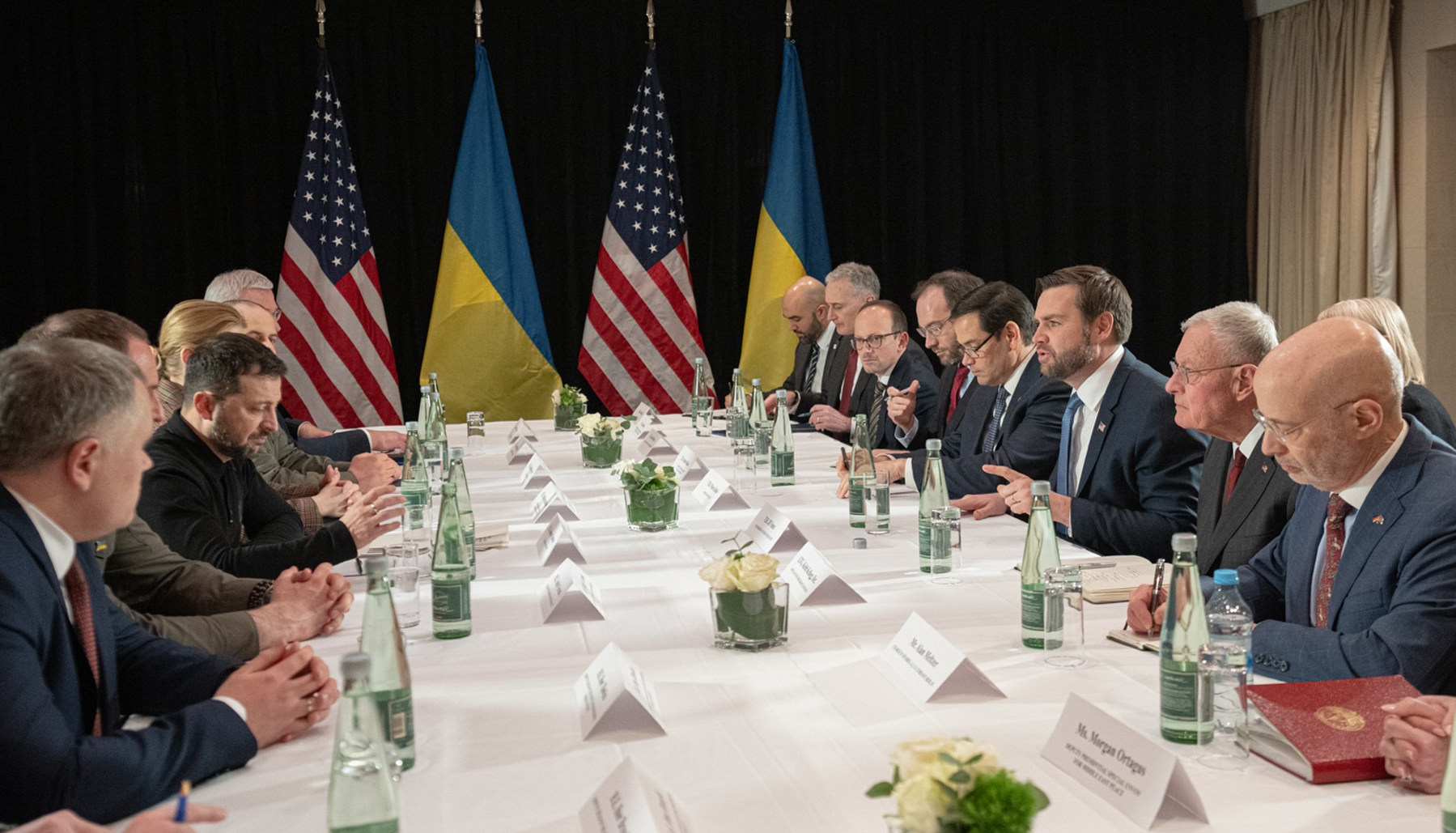
Vance and Secretary Marco Rubio with President Volodymyr Zelenskyy at the 61st Munich Security Conference

In December 2023, Vance was criticized for calling for the suspension of further aid to Ukraine because he said it would be used so its ministers "can buy a bigger yacht". He has criticized the Ukrainian government for corruption, and contends that the Biden administration has not properly audited aid to Ukraine.

In interviews and statements in 2024, Vance said that he did not want Russia to conquer Ukraine, but supported a "freeze" of "the territorial lines somewhere close to where they are right now"; guarantees of Kyiv's neutrality and exclusion of Ukraine from NATO (a key Russian demand); and providing "some American security assistance over the long term." Vance and Trump's special envoy Keith Kellogg said that continued arms shipments to Ukraine and a heavily fortified demilitarised zone would ensure that Russia would not launch another invasion.

=== United Kingdom ===
Vance visits U.S. troops stationed in the United Kingdom; August 13, 2025

In July 2024, after the British Labour Party won a landslide victory in the 2024 United Kingdom general election, Vance said in a speech at the National Conservatism Convention: "I was talking with a friend recently ... what is the first truly Islamist country that will get a nuclear weapon? And we were like, 'maybe it's Iran, maybe Pakistan already kind of counts', and then we sort of finally decided maybe it's actually the UK, since Labour just took over".

Senior British officials, such as Angela Rayner, James Murray, and Andrew Bowie dismissed this statement, which echoed right-wing characterizations of Britain and Europe. Nevertheless, Vance and British foreign secretary David Lammy have described each other as friends, and Vance's foreign policy advisor, Elbridge Colby, called Lammy "far preferable" to his Conservative predecessor, David Cameron.

=== Venezuela ===
In 2025, Vice President JD Vance said the 2026 United States strikes in Venezuela operation was justified as Maduro was a wanted fugitive in the United States. He also declared that "the stolen oil must be returned".

== Health care ==
Vance supported the Biden administration's legislation allowing Medicare to negotiate drug prices. In 2022, he cosponsored a bill to cap the price of insulin, and he supports permitting the importing of medical drugs from overseas. Vance has suggested he would support legislative efforts to provide universal pregnancy healthcare coverage.

Vance has said that he has no intention of repealing the Affordable Care Act (Obamacare). During the vice presidential nominees' debate in October 2024, he said that Trump "salvaged Obamacare". Trump tried to have Obamacare repealed in 2017, but the attempt was thwarted by Senator John McCain.

=== Vaccine and mask mandates ===
In August 2021, Vance wrote an op-ed opposing Ohio State University's COVID vaccination requirement.

In September 2023, Vance introduced his "Freedom to Breathe" bill to prevent federal agencies from requiring masks on commercial airlines, on public transit, and in public schools, and to prevent those industries from refusing to serve people who don't wear a mask. He claimed that mask mandates "failed to control the spread of respiratory viruses", "violated basic bodily freedom", and were "unscientific". In Senate remarks, he said children "need us to not be Chicken Little about every single respiratory pandemic and problem that confronts this country".

=== Social Security ===
Vance said in 2024 that he opposed cuts to Social Security or Medicare, and opposed privatizing Social Security. He has said concerns about the long-term solvency of the Social Security Trust Fund are overstated, and that increasing labor force participation and birth rate would sustain the system.

== Climate change and the environment ==
According to Politico, Vance changed his position to reject the scientific consensus on climate change after receiving donations from the fossil fuel industry. In 2020, he expressed skepticism about the efficacy of natural gas during a speech at Ohio State University. He has since questioned the validity of anthropogenic climate change and advocated for the repeal of the Inflation Reduction Act's clean energy provisions. During his 2022 United States Senate campaign, Vance received more than $283,000 from the petroleum industry, according to OpenSecrets.

Vance has downplayed the effects of climate change. In response to a radio host who said there is no climate crisis, Vance said, "No, I don't think there is, either." He has said, "If you think that man-made climate change is a catastrophic problem, the solution for it is for us to produce more of our own energy, including fossil fuels, here in the United States".

Vance has argued that environmental regulations have caused many manufacturing jobs to be outsourced to other countries. He has proposed a bill that would repeal certain tax credits created by the Inflation Reduction Act for electric vehicles and institute a $7,500 tax credit for gas-powered cars manufactured in the U.S. Vance also proposed repealing electric vehicle tax credits to pay for ending the Earned Income Tax Credit's marriage penalty.

== Donald Trump and the 2020 presidential election ==
During the 2016 U.S. presidential election, Vance was an outspoken critic of Republican nominee Donald Trump. In a February 18, 2016, USA Today column, he wrote, "Trump's actual policy proposals, such as they are, range from immoral to absurd." In April, Vance said, "Trump is unfit for our nation's highest office". In the Atlantic and on a PBS show hosted by Charlie Rose, Vance called Trump "cultural heroin" and "an opioid of the masses." In August, he said that Trump was "noxious and is leading the white working class to a very dark place." In October, he called Trump an "idiot" and "reprehensible" in a post on Twitter and called himself a "never-Trump guy."

In a private message in 2016, Vance wrote, "I go back and forth between thinking Trump is a cynical asshole like Nixon who wouldn't be that bad (and might even prove useful) or that he's America's Hitler." In another private email in 2016, Vance called Trump a "disaster" and "a bad man. A morally reprehensible human being." He said he did not vote for Trump in 2016, but instead for independent candidate Evan McMullin.

By February 2018, Vance began changing his opinion, saying Trump "is one of the few political leaders in America that recognizes the frustration that exists in large parts of Ohio, Pennsylvania, eastern Kentucky and so forth". But in private Twitter messages in 2020, Vance wrote, "Trump has just so thoroughly failed to deliver on his economic populism (excepting a disjointed China policy)" and "I think Trump will probably lose" the 2020 presidential election.

In March 2021, Vance met Trump for an hour, in a discussion arranged by Vance's ex-boss, Peter Thiel. In July 2021, after Vance announced his Senate candidacy, Vance publicly declared himself a "flip-flop-flipper on Trump", saying that he "sort of got Trump's issues from the beginning", but "thought that this guy was not serious and was not going to be able to really make progress on the issues I cared about". Vance said that his change of heart to support Trump came when he disregarded the media's reporting on Trump and also recognized Trump as "the leader" of a popular "movement", whereupon Vance decided he should "suck it up and support" Trump. Around that time, Vance apologized for criticizing Trump in 2016 and deleted some of his social media posts that contained such criticisms. Vance said he now thought Trump was a good president.

In October 2021, of the 2020 United States presidential election that Trump lost to Joe Biden, Vance said that there "certainly" were "people voting illegally on a large-scale basis"; he then called the U.S. a "fake country" because, according to Vance, Facebook CEO Mark Zuckerberg helped Biden by buying "votes in our biggest geographies [to] tilt an election, transform who can be president". "It's really, really dangerous stuff", he added. Vance has also proposed that Trump should "fire every single mid-level bureaucrat, every civil servant in the administrative state. Replace them with our people." If the courts attempt to stop this, Vance says, Trump should ignore the rulings of the courts: "the chief justice has made his ruling, now let him enforce it".

On April 15, 2022, Trump endorsed Vance for Senate.

After historian Robert Kagan wrote a November 2023 Washington Post opinion piece titled "A Trump dictatorship is increasingly inevitable. We should stop pretending", Vance wrote Attorney General Merrick Garland a letter suggesting Kagan be prosecuted for promoting "open rebellion" by Democrat-controlled states. Kagan said that his piece did not advocate rebellion and said, "It is revealing that their first instinct when attacked by a journalist is to suggest that they be locked up."

In February 2024, Vance discussed then-Vice President Mike Pence's constitutionally required certification of the 2020 presidential election results; because Vance believed there were "a lot of problems" with the 2020 election, he said he would have acted differently: "If I had been vice president, I would have told the states, like Pennsylvania, Georgia, and so many others, that we needed to have multiple slates of electors and I think the U.S. Congress should have fought over it from there". His mention of "multiple slates of electors" was a call for pro-Trump electors to be sent from states that Trump had lost, a measure that deviated from the Constitution. In a September interview on the All-In podcast, Vance repeated this stance on the 2020 election certification.

On June 30, 2024, on Face the Nation, Vance said, "I believe that the president has broad pardon authority ... but more importantly, I think the president has immunity".

Vance was named as Trump's running mate on July 15, 2024, at the Republican National Convention. He now shares Trump's views on trade, foreign policy, and immigration. While many Democrats and some Republicans see Vance's shift as opportunistic, Trump loyalists generally believe it is a genuine progression, noting Vance's strong focus on working-class voters.

Vance played a key role in establishing the Rockbridge Network, a group backed by Silicon Valley investors aimed at influencing U.S. politics by supporting right-wing media, voter turnout efforts, and election polling. The network, with a significant budget for the 2024 elections, became known for its connections to tech investors and its support of Trump's nationalist agenda.

During the October 2024 vice-presidential nominees' debate, Tim Walz asked Vance: "Did [Trump] lose the 2020 election?" Vance replied: "Tim, I'm focused on the future", then changed the subject to argue about online censorship "in the wake of the 2020 COVID situation". Within a week after the debate, a video was published that showed Vance twice falsely claiming that Trump won the 2020 election.

Vance reportedly was "100% behind" Trump's decision to grant clemency to all January 6 rioters, and initially advocated for a blanket pardon but thought Trump wouldn't want to do so for political reasons. On January 20, 2026—the fifth anniversary of the Capitol riot—Vance posted a meme mocking Congressional Democrats who were holding a candlelight vigil to remember the violence of the attack.

== Criticism of "woke" ideology ==
In a speech and an interview in 2021, Vance condemned "woke capital", a phrase he used for the idea that the nation's largest and most powerful institutions, including big business, large financial institutions, academia, the media, the government, and large foundations, have united against the right. He said, "Woke capital is turning our society into a socially progressive hellhole" and "conservatism has to be a counterrevolutionary force" against "liberal elite culture", adding that the country needs "a de-woke-ification program". He analogized this to the "de-Baathification" of Iraq after the fall of Saddam Hussein and the "de-Nazification" of Germany after World War II, saying it was insufficient to "replace the bad Nazis with the good Germans. There was this entire effort to de-institutionalize that ideology."

Vance has asserted that China would be happy for the U.S. to "go woke" because it would weaken the country culturally and militarily, and he suggested that Jeff Bezos donate to the Black Lives Matter movement because riots would destroy small businesses, thereby decreasing business competition, another goal of woke capital. He also decried Harvard University as a "woke social justice hedge fund" that "trains the next generation of priests in the woke seminary that's dominating our professional class". At a 2023 U.S. Senate hearing with the chief executive officers of several large financial institutions, Vance questioned them about their "woke actions and commitments" and voiced his worry that the political and financial systems are "infecting" each other.

== Universities ==
In 2017, Vance said that universities help businesses by providing "high quality talent" and "intellectual property".

However, during his 2022 U.S. Senate campaign, his first bid for public office, J.D. Vance adopted a critical stance toward higher education, characterizing American universities as institutions hostile to conservative values. In a 2021 keynote speech at the National Conservatism Conference titled "The Universities are the Enemy," Vance argued that universities are "very hostile institutions dedicated to deceit and lies, not to the truth," and claimed they exert disproportionate influence over public discourse by controlling the definition of truth and falsity in society. He asserted that academic institutions lend credibility to ideas he described as "most ridiculous," and called on conservatives to "honestly and aggressively attack the universities in this country" in order to advance their political objectives. He ended the speech by praising the "wisdom" in former U.S. President Richard Nixon's quote that "the professors are the enemy".

In the U.S. Senate, Vance positioned himself as a populist critic of elite higher education institutions. He introduced legislation aimed at strengthening enforcement of federal laws requiring colleges and universities to disclose foreign donations, and sponsored a separate bill proposing a significant increase in the excise tax on endowment investment income from 1.4 percent to 35 percent for secular, private institutions in 2023. Vance argued that the tax hike was necessary to address what he described as an ideologically extreme and financially privileged university system, referring to such institutions as "massive hedge funds pretending to be universities." Speaking on the Senate floor in December, he criticized the current tax structure as unfair to working-class Americans, stating, "It’s insane. It’s unfair. And I think we ought to fix it in this chamber now." However, neither bill advanced in the Democratic-controlled Senate. Following the Supreme Court's 2023 decision to end race-conscious admissions.

The website for Vance's 2022 Senate campaign said that universities "teach that America is an evil, racist nation" and train prospective teachers to "bring that indoctrination into our elementary and high schools", and he proposed cutting funding for any university that teaches "critical race theory or radical gender ideology".

After the Supreme Court's 2023 opinion in Students for Fair Admissions v. Harvard ending race-conscious admissions, Vance wrote ten college and university presidents, including all Ivy League university presidents as well as Oberlin and Kenyon Colleges, calling their response to the ruling "openly defiant and potentially unlawful" and telling them "to preserve records for a congressional probe of their efforts to undermine" the ruling.

In 2024, he said that universities "are about enforcing dogma and doctrine" rather than pursuing truth, and extolled Hungarian President Viktor Orbán's crackdown on universities, suggesting that the U.S. model its actions on Orbán's. He also said they are "controlled by left-wing foundations" and "there needs to be a political solution to that problem".

== Department of Justice and Federal Bureau of Investigation ==
Vance speaking on the Senate floor about the politicization of the Department of Justice; July 27, 2023

Vance has criticized both the U.S. Department of Justice (DOJ) and the Federal Bureau of Investigation (FBI). He called the DOJ "the most egregious and out-of-control part of the deep state in this country" and suggested appointing people "who actually take a side in the culture war" rather than "just pretend we don’t have to take sides at all". After the DOJ indicted Donald Trump for allegedly mishandling classified documents, Vance condemned it as a "political persecution masquerading as law" and started putting procedural holds on all Biden appointees to the DOJ. He has claimed that the DOJ "harasses Christians for pro-life advocacy, but allows hardened criminals to walk our streets unpunished".

Vance called for the FBI's "corrupt leadership" to be investigated, and alleged that the FBI illegally wiretapped Trump while he was president. He also claimed that the FBI was "explicitly participating in some of the censorship regime in the run-up to the 2020 election".

== Influences, followings and endorsements ==
Vance has cited the writers Patrick Deneen, Rod Dreher, Curtis Yarvin, and J. R. R. Tolkien as influences on his beliefs. Peter Thiel, William Julius Wilson, Robert Putnam, David Autor, René Girard, Raj Chetty, Oren Cass, and Yoram Hazony are also said to have shaped his thinking. Dreher was a guest at Vance's baptism. Vance has compared himself to Richard Nixon.

In a 2022 podcast appearance, Vance said the U.S. was in a situation like the late Roman republic's: "We are in a late republican period... If we're going to push back against it, we're going to have to get pretty wild, and pretty far out there, and go in directions that a lot of conservatives right now are uncomfortable with."

Vance has said he is "plugged into a lot of weird, right-wing subcultures" online. News sources have noted he follows controversial figures such as Bronze Age Pervert, Raw Egg Nationalist, and Lomez on Twitter, and he exchanged text messages with far-right activist Chuck Johnson for almost two years. Vance has credited the far-right influencer Curtis Yarvin for many of his political views.

In a September 2021 tweet, Vance called far-right conspiracy theorist Alex Jones "a far more reputable source of information than Rachel Maddow". He later said in a private speech, "if you listen to Alex Jones every day, you would believe that a transnational financial elite controls things in our country, that they hate our society, and oh, by the way, a lot of them are probably sex perverts too. Sorry, ladies and gentlemen, that's actually a hell of a lot more true than Rachel Maddow's view of society."

Politico reported in August 2024 that Vance's embrace of MAGA ideology "was influenced by his relationships with a handful of niche conservative writers and thinkers" who oppose "the liberal project of 'progress'—especially in the form of economic liberalization, technological advancement and the leveling of social hierarchies". Politico listed Vance's seven "intellectual" influences as Patrick Deneen, Peter Thiel, Curtis Yarvin, René Girard, Sohrab Ahmari, Rod Dreher, and the Claremont Institute.

In 2017, Vance praised and wrote the introduction to a report published by the Heritage Foundation, which labeled hunger a "great motivation" for Americans to work.

Vance wrote a foreword to Dawn's Early Light: Taking Back Washington to Save America, a book by Kevin Roberts, president of the Heritage Foundation, in which Vance praised Roberts for attempting to communicate a "genuinely new future for conservatism". Roberts's proposals, Vance writes, are "an essential weapon" for the political battles ahead, which require "offensive conservatism". The Heritage Foundation has advocated Project 2025's proposals; Vance previously called the foundation "the most influential engine of ideas for Republicans". He also wrote the foreword to the Heritage Foundation's 2017 Index of Culture and Opportunity, calling it "admirable" and saying that it helps people ask "the right questions". He gave the keynote speech at its launch.

Vance also wrote a blurb for the book coauthored by Joshua Lisec and far-right conspiracy theorist Jack Posobiec, Unhumans: The Secret History of Communist Revolutions (and How to Crush Them), which argues that those on the political left should be considered less than human. Vance's blurb says that "communists … march through HR, college campuses, and courtrooms to wage lawfare against good, honest people" and that Posobiec and Lisec "show us what to do to fight back".

Vance gave a talk at the book launch for Up from Conservatism, a collection of essays edited by Arthur Milikh, executive director of the Center for the American Way of Life at the Claremont Institute. In his speech, Vance said the book had "great seeds of wisdom".

Vance has contributed to the Federalist Society, a prominent conservative and libertarian legal organization, and has spoken at its events and participated in its discussions.

== Judiciary ==
JD Vance
(@JDVance)
tweeted:

English:

If a judge tried to tell a general how to conduct a military operation, that would be illegal.

If a judge tried to command the attorney general in how to use her discretion as a prosecutor, that's also illegal.

Judges aren't allowed to control the executive's legitimate power.

February 9, 2025
