= List of anti-communist books =

The following is a list of anti-communist books, this being books heavily critical or expressing opposition towards the ideology of communism as a central or reoccurring theme. Some of these works may overlap communism with socialism, particularly those based on or set in the Soviet Union. This list does not include McCarthyism books, nor does this list include books that merely make brief trivial mentions of communism in a negative light.

== Non-fiction ==
- Egg on Mao: The Story of an Ordinary Man Who Defaced an Icon and Unmasked a Dictatorship by Denise Chong (Chinese-Canadian; 2009)
- McCarthyism - The Fight For America by Joseph McCarthy (American; 1952)
- O Mínimo Que Você Precisa Saber para Não Ser um Idiota by Olavo de Carvalho (Portuguese; 2013)
- The Black Book of Communism: Crimes, Terror, Repression by Éditions Robert Laffont (publisher) and various (French; 1997)
- The God that Failed by Louis Fischer, André Gide, Arthur Koestler, Ignazio Silone, Stephen Spender, and Richard Wright (various; 1949)
- Unhumans by Jack Posobiec and Joshua Lisec (American; 2024)

== Fiction ==
- An Excess Male by Maggie Shen King (Chinese-American; 2017)
- One Day in the Life of Ivan Denisovich by Aleksandr Solzhenitsyn (Russian; 1962)
- Sofia Petrovna by Lydia Chukovskaya (Soviet; 1939–40)
- We The Living by Ayn Rand (American, 1936)
- Doctor Zhivago by Boris Pasternak (Russo-Italian, 1957)
- Wave of Terror by Theodore Odrach (Soviet-Canadian; 2008)
- The Hunt for Red October by Tom Clancy (American; 1984)
- The John Franklin Letters by an anonymous author, probably Revilo P. Oliver (American; 1959)

== See also ==
- Anti-communism
- Criticism of Marxism
- Criticism of socialism
- Anti-Stalinist left
- Anti-Sovietism
