= 86 47 =

American political term

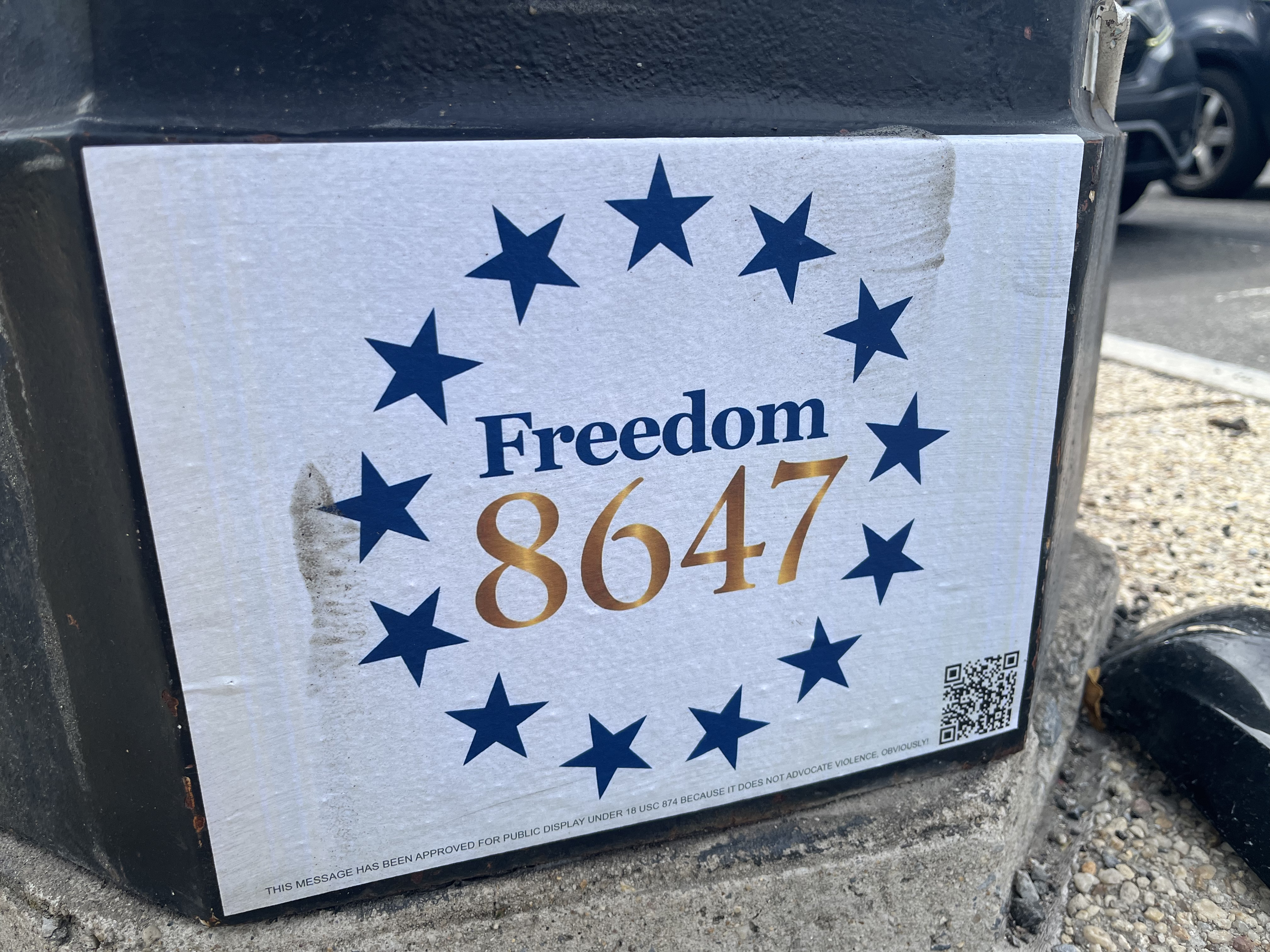
A "86 47" reference in a sign parodying Freedom 250 in 2026

86 47 (alternatively written as 8647, 86-47 or 8645) is a term used by opponents of 45th and 47th U.S. president Donald Trump. The digits "86" broadly mean "throw out" or "get rid of", while "45" or "47" represents the number of Trump's presidency.

The term is claimed by Trump and his administration to be a call for violence or deadly force against him, although this interpretation has been described by third parties as unsupported. During the second Trump administration, the Secret Service has investigated over 1,300 instances of people using the symbol. Trump critic and former FBI director James Comey was indicted in 2026 for allegedly using the term to incite violence against the president.

== History ==
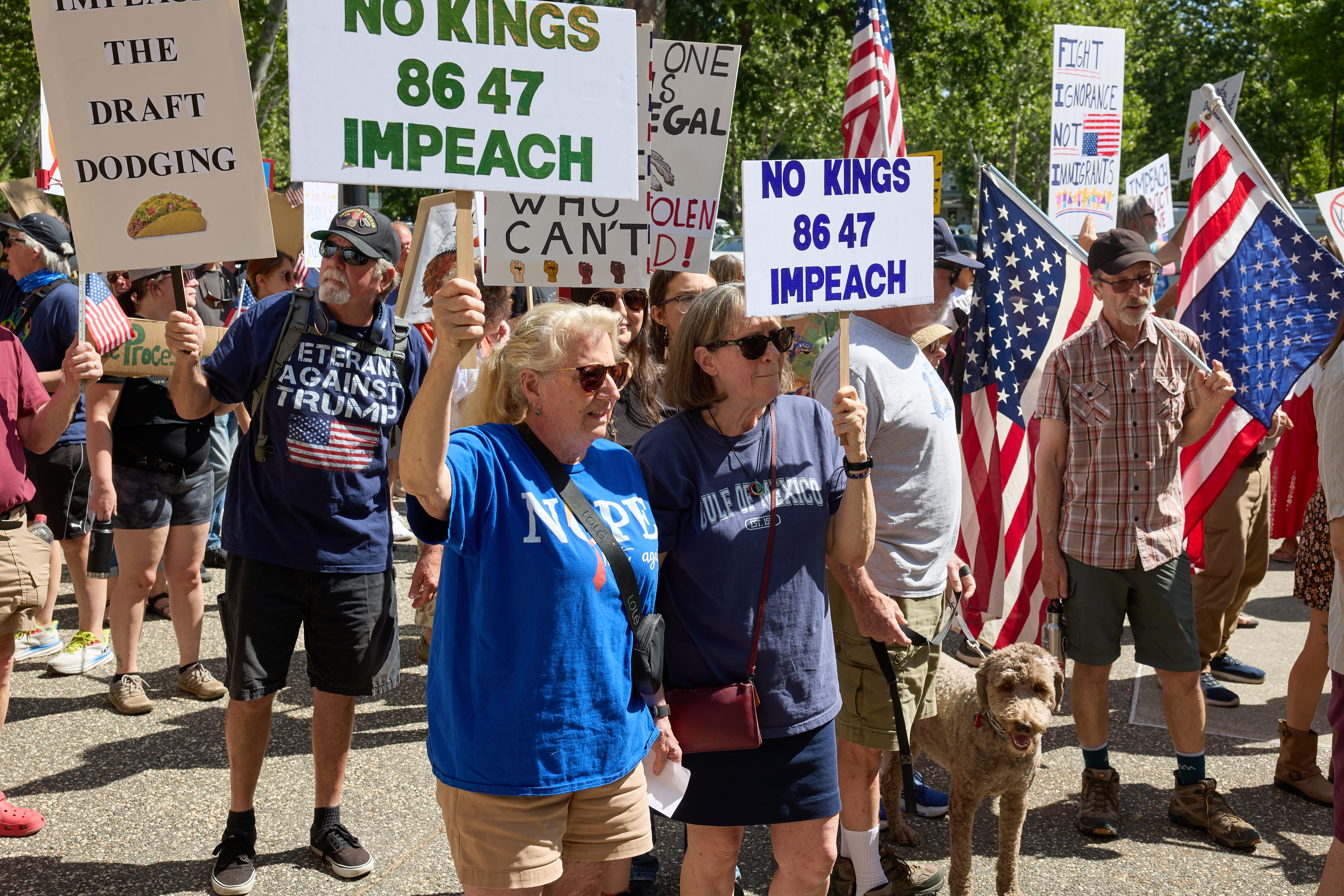
"86 47" being displayed in a No Kings protest in 2025

In a 2020 interview with Meet the Press, Michigan governor Gretchen Whitmer had a "86 45" symbol in the background. The sign drew criticism by a number of Trump supporters, who described it as a call to political violence. The number "86" is used in the hospitality industry to mean "remove", usually in the context of a sold-out item or an unruly customer.

After Joe Biden was elected president of the United States, a number of stores sold "86 46"-branded merchandise items in opposition to him. Conservative activist Jack Posobiec wrote "86 46" in a social media post in 2022, which he said was a call to impeach, but not kill, Biden.

In May 2025, former Federal Bureau of Investigation Director James Comey posted a photo on Instagram that prominently displayed the numbers "86 47" with some arranged seashells on a sandy beach. Some Republicans said that Comey's image was a threat directed at the life of the 47th president, Donald Trump. Trump told Fox News's Bret Baier that Comey was "calling for the assassination of the president". The Trump administration said the Secret Service was investigating Comey's "86 47" social media post. Many pro-Trump figures, including Matt Gaetz and Jack Posobiec, who said they were enraged by Comey's use of "86" in reference to Trump, had previously directed the term at their own political opponents.

Comey then deleted the post. He wrote on Instagram that he viewed it as a political message and that he "didn't realize some folks associate those numbers with violence". He was interviewed by the Secret Service and said he did not intend any harm to the president.

In April 2026, the Justice Department brought the case to a federal grand jury in the Eastern District of North Carolina, which indicted Comey on charges that he "did knowingly and willfully make a threat to take the life of, and to inflict bodily harm upon, the president of the United States". In July, Comey's attorneys asked the court to throw out the charges because they are "contradicted by every possible source of meaning: dictionaries, context, precedent and common sense. '86' simply means 'get rid of' or 'eject' and has no violent connotation except in the most uncommon usages."

A previous indictment of Comey on unrelated charges was dismissed by the judge in the case after it was determined that the prosecutor had not been legally appointed.

In May 2026, the organization Accountability Now USA started flying a flag saying "86 47" on National Park Service land near the National Mall in Washington, D.C. Members of the group were approached by Secret Service officers about the flag, and told them it was a reference to getting the 47th president, Donald Trump, out of office, not a call for harm. The group asked for and was granted a temporary restraining order enabling them to continue flying the flag. Federal judge Randolph Moss concluded that it was not intended as a threat and was therefore protected speech.

On June 11, 2026, three days before Trump's birthday celebrations were to be held, it was discovered that the grass on the National Mall had somehow been etched with the numbers "86 47". The large numerals were visible between the Washington Monument and the Lincoln Memorial, with the "8" more visible than the other numerals. A spokesperson for the U.S. Interior Department, which oversees the Mall, was quoted in news media reports saying, "The deranged vandalism on our National Mall will not be tolerated. Any threat against the President is taken very seriously by the Department, and our U.S. Park Police will investigate this incident and hold those responsible accountable." Grass samples were collected for testing to aid in the investigation.

== See also ==
- Let's Go Brandon
- Drill, baby, drill
