= Dawn's Early Light =

Book by Kevin Roberts

Dawn's Early Light: Taking Back Washington to Save America
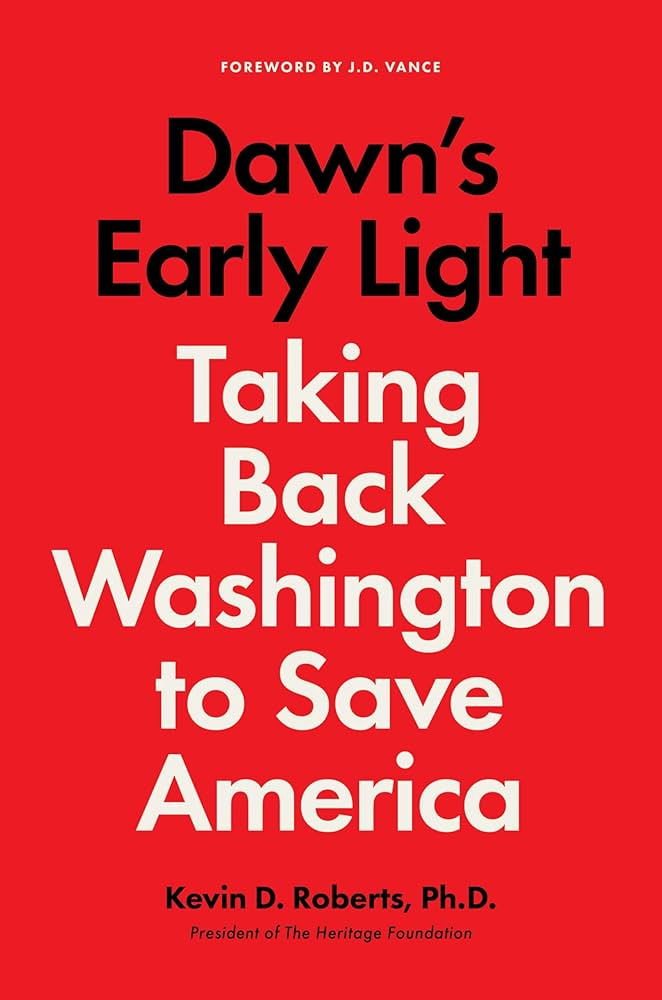
- Author: Kevin Roberts
- Language: English
- Subject: American Politics
- Genre: Nonfiction
- Publisher: HarperCollins
- Publication date: November 12, 2024
- Publication place: United States
- ISBN: 978-0-063-35350-3 (print)

Dawn's Early Light: Taking Back Washington to Save America is a 2024 book written by Kevin Roberts, president of the Heritage Foundation. The book's foreword is authored by JD Vance, vice president in the second Trump administration.

== History ==
The book was first scheduled for release on September 24, 2024, and was originally titled Dawn's Early Light: Burning Down Washington to Save America before being re-titled to Dawn's Early Light: Taking Back Washington to Save America. The book's cover was also changed; the original featured a match.

The volume includes a foreword by JD Vance. Amid the controversy surrounding Project 2025, in August 2024 Roberts postponed the book release until after the November election. Heritage and Project 2025 and Dawn's Early Light in particular were seen as potential liabilities by the campaign and as a result the campaign distanced itself from Heritage. Of the delay Roberts said "There's a time for writing, reading and book tours, and a time to put down the books and go fight like hell to take back our country."

It was published by HarperCollins on November 12, 2024. Publishing was handled by HarperCollins conservative imprint Broadside Books. The launch party was held at the Kimberly Hotel in New York City.

== Contents ==
In the foreword, Vance writes that it is "time to circle the wagons and load the muskets."

The main section of the book starts with a quote from the Aeneid: "My spirit kindles to fire, and rises in wrath to avenge my dying land."

The New Statesman, in January 2025, reported that the central thesis of the book is that America's institutions need to be destroyed in order to be rebuilt.

== Reception ==
Colin Dickey of The New Republic wrote in August 2024 that the book reveals planned "paranoid, Stalinist tactics" like using conspiracy theories to violently enforce the right's vision for the world, citing how Roberts criticizes birth control and law enforcement (preferring more of a heavily armed frontier-like society), while promoting public prayer as a key tool in the competition with China.

Lloyd Green of The Guardian said that on Roberts "wants to burn it all down" and compared him to a pyromaniac.

Freddie Hayward of the New Statesman wrote, "Throughout Dawn's Early Light, the enormity of the ends – the preservation of America – is used to justify extraordinary means." and notes that "Whatever the flaws in his argument, what should worry the left is Roberts' moral certainty. Gone are the flaccid paeans to the supremacy of the free market; in their place is a conviction to march through America's institutions with a flamethrower."

== See also ==
- 1789 Capital
- Conservatism in the United States
- Department of Government Efficiency
- Hillbilly Elegy
- Political positions of JD Vance
- Rockbridge Network
- Unhumans
