= Jack Posobiec =

American alt-right activist and conspiracy theorist (born 1984)

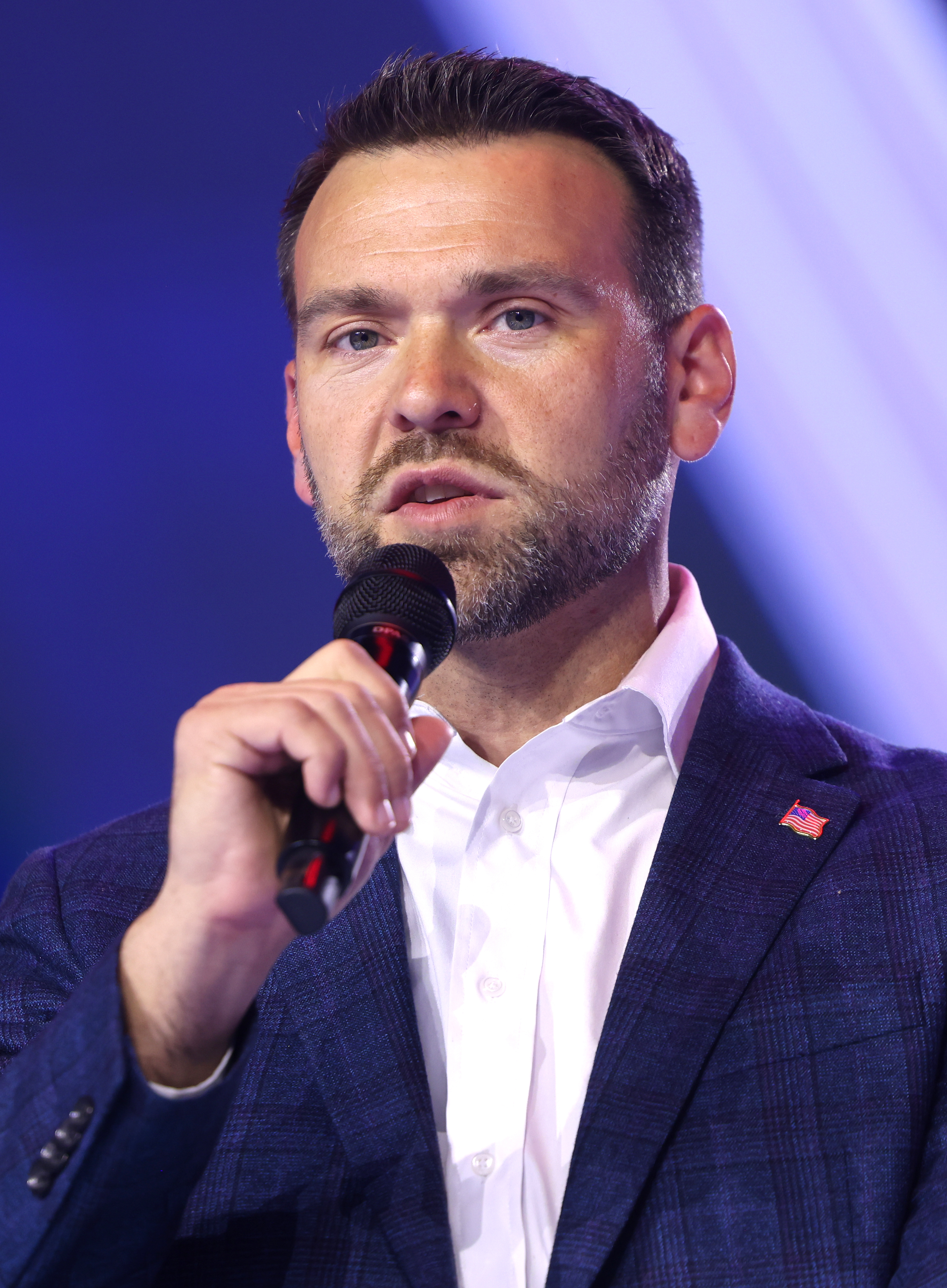
- Posobiec in 2025
- Born: Jack Michael Posobiec III; December 14, 1984 (age 41); Norristown, Pennsylvania, US
- Education: Temple University (BA)
- Occupations: Political activist; news correspondent
- Employers: One America News Network (2018–2021); Turning Point USA (2021–present); Human Events (2021–present)
- Political party: Republican
- Spouse: Tanya Tay Posobiec (m. 2017)
- Military career
- Allegiance: United States
- Branch: United States Navy
- Service years: 2010–2017
- Rank: Lieutenant (junior grade)

Jack Michael Posobiec III (/pəˈsoʊbɪk/ pə-SOH-bik; born December 14, 1984) is an American alt-right political activist, television correspondent, conspiracy theorist, and former United States Navy intelligence officer.

Posobiec is known for his pro-Donald Trump comments on Twitter. As of 2016, he was using white supremacist and antisemitic symbols and talking points, including references to the white genocide conspiracy theory. In 2017, he promoted fake news, including the debunked Pizzagate conspiracy theory claiming high-ranking Democratic Party officials were involved in a child sex ring. Also in 2017, Posobiec distanced himself from white nationalism and expressed opposition to "hate groups and bigotry".

He was a promoter of the Stop the Steal movement in the wake of the 2020 election cycle. From 2018 to 2021, Posobiec was employed by One America News Network (OANN), a far-right cable channel, as a political correspondent and on-air presenter. He left OANN in May 2021 to begin hosting a show for the conservative student organization Turning Point USA, and to join conservative news site Human Events as a senior editor.

== Early life and education ==
Posobiec was born and raised in Norristown, Pennsylvania, to a family of Polish descent. His parents were both Democrats.

He attended Kennedy–Kenrick Catholic High School and college at Temple University. While at Temple, he became the chairman of the Temple University College Republicans and started a chapter of Students for Academic Freedom, an organization run by the David Horowitz Freedom Center. He was a summer intern for US Senator Rick Santorum and volunteered for US Representative Curt Weldon's unsuccessful reelection campaign in 2006. He graduated from Temple in 2006 with a double major in political science and broadcast journalism.

== Career ==
After graduation, Posobiec worked for the United States Chamber of Commerce in Shanghai, People's Republic of China. He performed a minor role in the film The Forbidden Kingdom, which was released in 2008. He later worked for the conservative talk radio station WPHT and then for the campaign of Steve Johnson in the 2010 Pennsylvania lieutenant gubernatorial election. Posobiec served several years in the United States Navy Reserve from 2010 to 2017, reaching the rank of lieutenant junior grade. He was deployed for ten months at Guantanamo Bay Naval Base from September 2012 and worked at the Office of Naval Intelligence (ONI), where he later worked again as a civilian.

During the 2016 election, Posobiec was a special projects director of Citizens for Trump, a pro-Trump organization but not an official group. In March 2017, Posobiec resigned from his full-time civilian position at ONI, saying that his support for Trump led to a "toxic work environment". As of August 2017, his security clearance was suspended and was under review.

=== Political activities ===
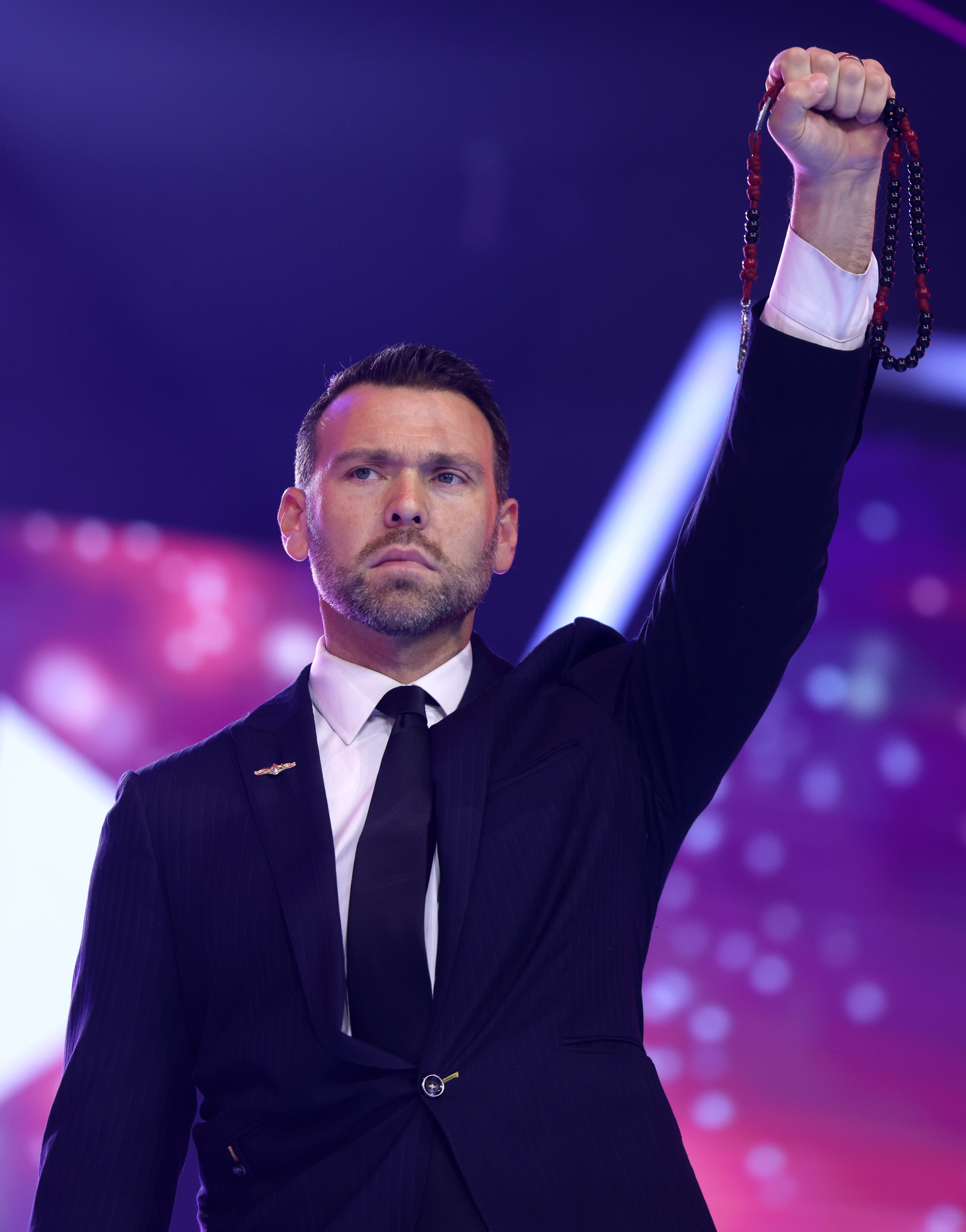
Posobiec entrance with his rosary at AmericaFest 2025

Posobiec describes himself as a "Republican political operative". During the 2016 election, Posobiec was a special projects director of the political organization Citizens for Trump. Semafor found he was by far the most influential voice with dozens of Republican strategists going into the 2024 campaign season.

He said in 2017 that his work was "reality journalism—part investigative, part activist, part commentary", and that "I'm willing to break the fourth wall. I'm willing to walk into an anti-Trump march and start chanting anti-Clinton stuff—to make something happen, and then cover what happens." Will Sommer, then an editor at The Hill, declared Posobiec frequently lies, stating in 2017 that Posobiec "make[s] stuff up, relentlessly", and that "there's no one at that level."

On June 16, 2017, Posobiec disrupted a Shakespeare in the Park production of Julius Caesar that depicted the title character as a Trump-like figure. Posobiec was prompted by Mike Cernovich, another alt-right conspiracy theorist, who had offered a $1,000 prize for anyone who interrupted a performance. "You are all Goebbels, you are all Nazis like Joseph Goebbels", he shouted at the audience in a video he posted on Twitter. Posobiec was escorted from the event along with another protester, Laura Loomer, who was arrested for disorderly conduct after refusing to leave the stage.

Posobiec has supported other conservative political figures with similar tactics. He promoted e-mails and files leaked to 4chan of President of France Emmanuel Macron shortly before the French presidential election in 2017. In a video shot for Rebel Media, Posobiec promoted the candidacy of Marine Le Pen of the National Front. Posobiec celebrated the Macron leak at a party hosted by Milo Yiannopoulos. In October 2017, Posobiec and Cernovich formed a super PAC called #Rev18 and announced its support for Josh Mandel in the 2018 US Senate election in Ohio. In July 2017, Posobiec handed out flyers thanking Democratic senators for "protecting our quality violent porn content", including "ritual Satanic porn videos". The flyers were distributed outside the U.S. Senate at a demonstration in support of net neutrality.

Posobiec organized a "Rally Against Political Violence" in Washington, D.C., on June 25, 2017, to condemn the shooting of Steve Scalise. Richard Spencer, another alt-right figure who organized a separate, competing rally at the same time, ridiculed Posobiec's event and called it "pathetic". In November 2017, Posobiec encouraged his Twitter followers to target a woman at her workplace after she came forward with allegations that Alabama Senate candidate Roy Moore had attempted to have sex with her when she was 14 years old. In Pennsylvania's 18th congressional district special election in March 2018, Posobiec supported Democrat Conor Lamb over Republican Rick Saccone. Posobiec described Lamb as a "Pro-Trump Dem veteran".

Posobiec became a fellow of the Claremont Institute, a conservative think tank, in 2019.

In June 2020, in Washington, D.C.'s Lincoln Park, Posobiec was shoved and chased for several minutes by a dozen protesters at the Emancipation Memorial. The protesters called Posobiec, who was filming speakers, a Nazi and forced him from the park. Police arrived in a van and, after trying to quell the disturbance, helped Posobiec into the van before driving away. Posobiec tweeted later that he was "totally fine" but "filing an assault report with DC police".

In 2022, Posobiec wrote on Twitter "86 46", apparently referring to the president at the time, Joe Biden; in 2025, after James Comey published a photo of seashells in the pattern of "86 47", Posobiec accused Comey of urging "assassins to target our president [Donald Trump] and kill him", as Posobiec demanded Comey be arrested.

On February 22, 2024, Posobiec, speaking at the Conservative Political Action Conference, welcomed the "end of democracy," before adding that "we are here to overthrow it completely." Praising the January 6 United States Capitol attack, he then endeavored to "get rid of it and replace it with this right here"—holding his fist in the air. Clips of his remarks were widely shared on social media. In a subsequent speech and interview, he said those CPAC statements were "largely satirical", and also said, “We are always supportive of a constitutional republic....What we’re trying to do is return it to the original system. We’re not destroying all of democracy, just their [Democrats'] democracy."

In August 2024, opinion journalist Michelle Goldberg criticized Posobiec for co-authoring a book with Joshua Lisec, Unhumans: The Secret History of Communist Revolutions (and How to Crush Them). Posobiec's book argues that leftists are not entitled to be considered human and that democratic means for destroying the American political left are no longer viable. (Note: "The old rules are over. The old order is over. Accusations are evidence. Activism means bigotry and hate. Criminals are allowed to roam free... For nearly 250 years, far-left uprisings have followed the same battle plans—from the first call for change to last innocent executed, from denial a revolution is even happening to declaration of the new order... We must stop what is coming... Our study of history has brought us to this conclusion: Democracy has never worked to protect innocents from the unhumans.")

In September 2024, Posobiec was hired by the Republican National Committee to train volunteer election monitors in Michigan and Wisconsin. At the Michigan event, he described them as the "final line of defense against the encroaching Marxism."

In February 2025, Posobiec participated in Treasury Secretary Scott Bessent's visit to Ukraine and said he met with Ukrainian President Volodymyr Zelenskyy during the visit. He was also invited to participate in Defense Secretary Pete Hegseth's overseas trip abroad to Germany, Belgium and Poland as a media representative.

==== Ties to far-right extremists ====
Posobiec's social media and political activities are linked to neo-Nazi and white supremacist movements. Prior to 2018, he published multiple posts containing the white supremacist code "1488", or the Fourteen Words, and supported the use of the slogan. The 88 stands for HH, or Heil Hitler. In October 2016, Posobiec posted a tweet that included triple parentheses, an antisemitic symbol. In response to a 2017 Anti-Defamation League report on the alt-right, which included Posobiec, he tweeted a selfie of his visit to the Auschwitz-Birkenau Memorial in Poland: "The @ADL_National would be wise to remember what happened the last time people made lists of undesirables".

In April 2017, Posobiec promoted on Twitter an event staged by Obóz Narodowo-Radykalny (ONR), a Polish neo-fascist movement that bombed Jewish homes in the 1930s. Posobiec later deleted his tweet promoting the event.

In August 2017, following the 2017 Unite the Right rally in Charlottesville, Virginia, that led to violent clashes between white nationalists and counter-protesters, Posobiec said that the rally had become "massive propaganda" for the left and that the mainstream media was "fanning the flames of this violence." He said that Trump should have disavowed Black Lives Matter. Posobiec frequently tweeted about the white genocide conspiracy theory.

Posobiec later tweeted that he had consistently disavowed white nationalism and violence. He also tweeted that he was "done with trolling" and that it was "time to do the right thing." He said that, "I first disavowed white nationalists at my rally in July 2016," and in the following year (2017), he "denounced hate groups and bigotry."

In November 2018, Posobiec participated in a march on Warsaw marking Polish Independence Day. Many of those marching that day were not neo-nazis or the like, but attendees included ONR, Canadian white nationalist Stefan Molyneux and other far-right groups. On June 9, 2022, the Southern Poverty Law Center published an extremist file on Posobiec, citing his links to hate groups such as the Proud Boys and Oath Keepers, as well as his links to white nationalists, neo-Nazis, anti-government extremists, and the Polish far-right.

=== Media work ===
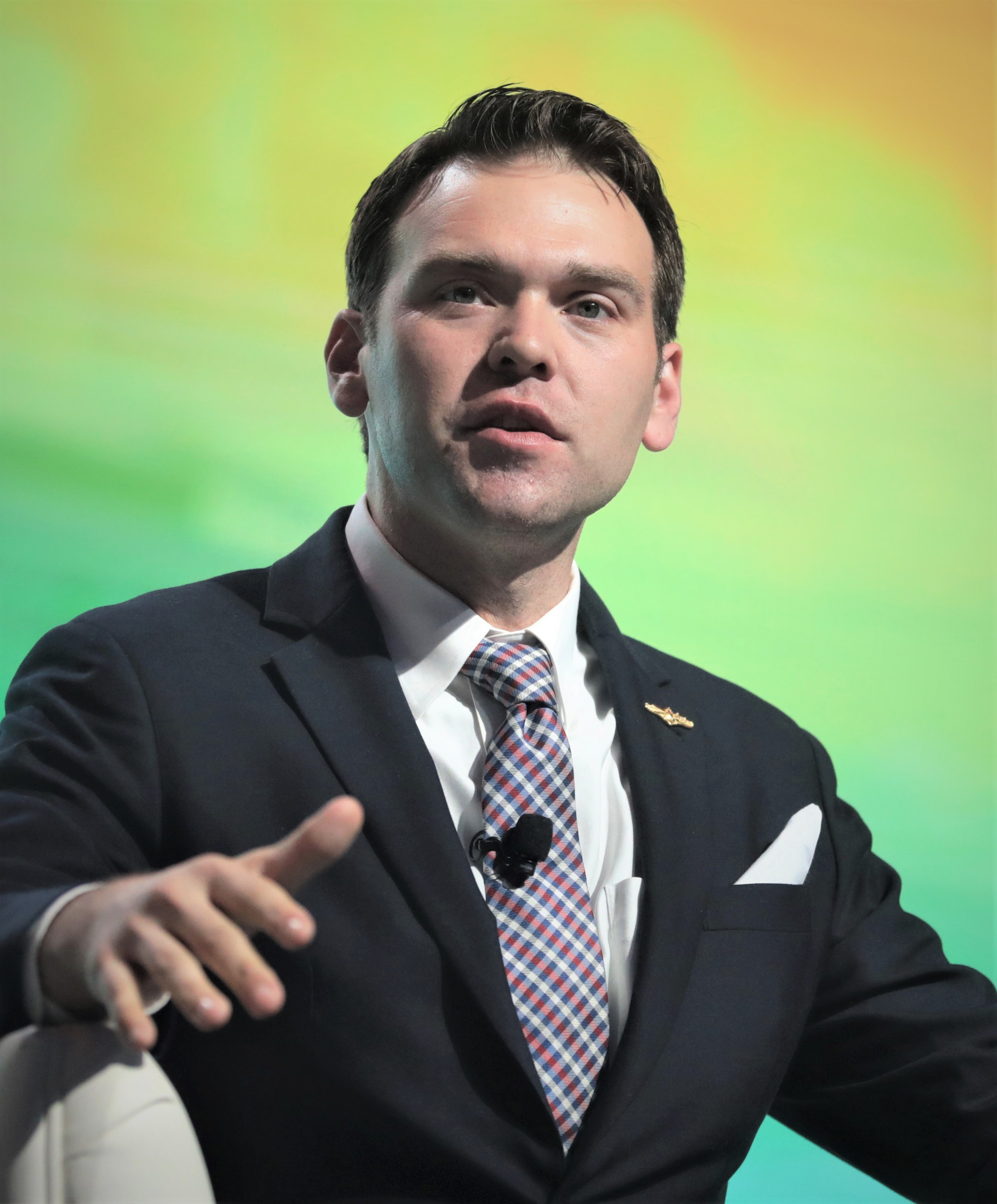
Posobiec in 2019

Between September 2016 and March 2017, Posobiec described himself as having previously worked for CBS News in his Twitter profile. CBS News told the Southern Poverty Law Center in 2020 that he had never worked for them.

Between early April and May 2017, Posobiec was employed by Rebel News, a far-right Canada-based website, as its Washington bureau chief, and was granted press access to the White House in April 2017. According to Philadelphia magazine, Posobiec "seem[ed] to have been charged in the press briefing room with haranguing legitimate journalists and running out the clock on press conferences with inane softball questions and Dear Leader obsequiousness" during his short time in the White House press pool.

In May 2017, Posobiec hired neo-Nazi brothers Jeffrey and Edward Clark to help create a documentary about the murder of Seth Rich for Rebel News. Jeffrey Clark was arrested by the FBI on gun charges after saying that the Jewish victims of the October 2018 Pittsburgh synagogue shooting "deserved exactly what happened to them and so much worse". Posobiec later said that he had never heard of Jeffrey Clark and had never made a documentary about Seth Rich, even though HuffPost published photographs of Posobiec and the Clarks working together. He left Rebel News after allegedly plagiarizing a video script from white supremacist Jason Kessler.

From 2018 to 2021, One America News Network (OANN), a far-right TV network known for promoting conspiracy theories, employed Posobiec as a political correspondent and on-air presenter. In September 2018, he presented the pro-Hitler online poster known as Microchip on the network without indicating that person's affiliations, according to the Southern Poverty Law Center. The SPLC said the two men had worked together in spreading disinformation for several years, including the false claims propagated in Pizzagate". Microchip also praised Atomwaffen Division, a neo-Nazi group responsible for multiple murders.

Posobiec left OANN in May 2021 to begin hosting a show for the conservative student organization Turning Point USA, and to join Human Events as a senior editor. He has worked as a contributor for Newsweek.

=== Conspiracy theories, falsehoods, and unsubstantiated claims ===
Posobiec has promoted many falsehoods, leading to Philadelphia calling him the "King of Fake News" in 2017. He was one of the most prominent promoters on social media of the Pizzagate conspiracy theory, which falsely claimed that high-ranking officials were involved in a child-sex ring centered at a Washington, D.C., pizzeria. He live-streamed an investigation of the pizzeria and was asked to leave after attempting to broadcast a child's birthday party being held in a back room. Posobiec later said he had always thought the Pizzagate theory was "stupid" and had filmed his visit to debunk it.

Posobiec attempted to discredit anti-Trump protesters in November 2016 by planting a sign at a protest reading "Rape Melania". Posobiec denied his involvement to BuzzFeed News, but the same phone number was used in his contact with the website and the text messages he reportedly sent. He said he had been questioned about it by the Secret Service. Posobiec organized the DeploraBall, an event held on January 19, 2017, to celebrate Trump's inauguration.

In December 2016, Posobiec claimed without evidence that Disney had re-written scenes in the Star Wars movie Rogue One to add "Anti Trump scenes calling him a racist", and called for a boycott of the Star Wars franchise. Disney denied the allegations.

Posobiec falsely said that former FBI director James Comey, at a United States Senate hearing on May 17, 2017, "said under oath that Trump did not ask him to halt any investigation". The claim was later repeated by conservative personalities and media outlets, including Fox News, Rush Limbaugh and the InfoWars website. Posobiec promoted the discredited conspiracy theory that Seth Rich had leaked e-mails from the Democratic National Committee to WikiLeaks. Posobiec promoted a hoax that CNN had published and then deleted an article defending Bill Maher's use of a racial slur.

In June 2017, shortly after Republican congressman Steve Scalise was shot and injured during baseball practice, along with four others, Posobiec tweeted that it was a terrorist attack and blamed comments from liberal anti-Trump individuals. Later, he falsely tweeted that former United States Attorney General Loretta Lynch had called for "blood in the streets" the previous March and that Bernie Sanders had ordered his followers to "take down" Trump.

In December 2017, Posobiec, along with Cernovich, The Gateway Pundit, and InfoWars, promoted a false theory that a passenger train derailment near Dupont, Washington, was linked to the Antifa anti-fascism movement.

In October 2019, after Lt. Col. Alexander Vindman, a White House national security official and decorated Iraq war veteran, testified in Congress about President Trump requesting that the Ukrainian President investigate his political rival Joe Biden, Posobiec falsely claimed that Vindman had been advising the Ukrainian government on ways to prevent Trump from implementing his foreign policy goals.

In June 2020, during the protests against racism and police brutality in the wake of the murder of George Floyd, Posobiec falsely claimed that there were pipe bombs planted at the Korean War Veterans Memorial in Washington, D.C., and that "federal assets [were] in pursuit". There were no pipe bombs nor was there any evidence that any "federal assets" investigated. The claim was, however, picked up by The Gateway Pundit and retweeted by over 29,000 users on Twitter.

In April 2021, the SPLC reported that between November 2019 and August 2020, Posobiec had tweeted 28 links to SouthFront, a website linked to Russian intelligence. In return, SouthFront promoted Posobiec as well, and cited his tweets in their posts.

Following the 2022 Russian invasion of Ukraine, Posobiec promoted the Ukraine bioweapons conspiracy theory and downplayed the Bucha massacre.

In February 2023, Posobiec tweeted a deepfake video depicting President Joe Biden announcing a military draft in response to a purported national security crisis. Posobiec tweeted false Biden quotes from the fake video, before calling it "a sneak preview of things to come". He later appeared in the video to acknowledge it was a "precreation...of what could happen."

In May 2024, after Donald Trump was convicted on all 34 charges of falsifying records in his hush money trial, Posobiec called on supporters to "[t]ake the path of the hunter, and with one singular voice, we are going to make them the prey." Additionally, he argued:

What happened to Donald Trump yesterday wasn't just a miscarriage of justice. It wasn't just a Stalinist show trial. It was an act of war. The unhumans want you dead. They want your way of life dead. They want to see your children lobotomized and converted to their mindless, lawless, and godless ways.

Posobiec has been linked as the person behind End Wokeness, a Twitter account which promoted the Springfield pet-eating hoax in September 2024. In October 2023, during the Gaza genocide, End Wokeness promoted a false claim that Palestinian journalist Saleh al-Jafarawi was a "Hamas crisis actor".

In October 2024, Posobiec posted a meme on his Instagram profile claiming that the January 6 House Select Committee had destroyed all the evidence it compiled against Donald Trump. In reality, the evidence is publicly available; the assertion was fact-checked and found to be false. In the same month, Posobiec boosted a false sexual assault claim against Democratic vice presidential candidate Tim Walz that originated from Russian propaganda network Storm-1516.

== Personal life ==
From 2012 to 2016, Posobiec ran a blog and podcast about Game of Thrones called AngryGoTFan. In November 2017, Posobiec married Tatsiana "Tanya Tay" Harbach, a social media influencer born in Belarus. He told BuzzFeed News that he met his wife in 2015. He is Catholic.

In May 2022, Posobiec claimed that he was detained as the World Economic Forum took place in Davos, Switzerland. Police denied this and stated that Posobiec was lying. Footage showed Posobiec talking with police officers though he was visibly not handucffed or detained.

In October 2025, Posobiec was reported to have voted in Pennsylvania in elections from 2004 to 2024 using his parents' address despite living in Hanover, Maryland, since 2017.

== Published works ==
- Citizens for Trump: The Inside Story of the People's Movement to Take Back America (2017) ISBN 978-1-5469-3653-4
- 4D Warfare: A Doctrine for a New Generation of Politics (Castalia House, 2018) ISBN 978-952-7065-65-5
- The Antifa: Stories from Inside the Black Bloc (Calamo Press, 2021) ISBN 978-0-9997059-7-1
- Unhumans: The Secret History of Communist Revolutions (and How to Crush Them) with Joshua Lisec, and foreword by Stephen K. Bannon. (War Room Books, 2024) ISBN 978-1-64821-085-3
