= Unhumans =

Book by Jack Posobiec and Joshua Lisec

- Cover
- Author: Jack Posobiec and Joshua Lisec
- Language: English
- Subject: American politics
- Publisher: War Room Books
- Publication date: 9 July 2024
- Publication place: United States
- Media type: Print
- Pages: 258
- ISBN: 978-1-64821-085-3
- OCLC: 1427657842

Unhumans: The Secret History of Communist Revolutions (and How to Crush Them) is a 2024 American political and polemical book by Jack Posobiec and co-author Joshua Lisec which was a New York Times bestseller. It features a foreword by Steve Bannon and a blurb from JD Vance. The book claims that the American left desires a communist dictatorship and thus should be labeled "unhumans" who should lack human rights. Reviewers criticized the book for being "fascist," "anti-democratic", and "hateful".

== Contents ==
The core thesis of the book is that the American left intends to terrorize and subjugate the United States under a communist dictatorship. In their telling, these people are "unhumans", too twisted and malicious to be allowed the status of human beings or accorded human rights.

For the last couple centuries, we've known them as communists. Socialists, with extra steps. And of course, leftists. Radicals and revolutionaries as well. A hundred years ago, Marxist Leninists, then more recently, Cultural Marxists. Even as, without irony and not as a joke, "progressives". For the purposes of this book, we will call them the unhumans.

In it the authors laud the contributions of Francisco Franco, Chiang Kai-shek, Augusto Pinochet, Joseph McCarthy, Julius Caesar, and Elon Musk to what they frame as an existential struggle against the dark forces of communism.

The book has a foreword written by Steve Bannon. It was endorsed by JD Vance, who wrote a cover blurb for the book. It also features praise from public figures, including Tucker Carlson, (Note: "[O]ne of the rare people worth listening to.") Donald Trump Jr., (Note: "The far Left [...] have repeatedly shown that they will stop at nothing to achieve their totalitarian goals. They have torn down countless societies using a sophisticated playbook of propaganda [...] Unhumans reveals that playbook and teaches us how to deploy it immediately to save the West.") Michael Flynn, (Note: "We are now living through an era of irregular warfare. This is a gray-zone communist revolution by new means. Unhumans exposes their battle plans.") and Robert Stacy McCain. (Note: "Unhumans teaches that the events Americans are living through now are not without precedent. There is a pattern to these events – a 'gray-zone communist revolution' – and if we do not wish to repeat the pattern, we must act intelligently to stop the destructive plans of the 'unhumans'.")

In the past, communists marched in the streets waving red flags. Today, they march through HR, college campuses, and courtrooms to wage lawfare against good, honest people. In Unhumans, Jack Posobiec and Joshua Lisec reveal their plans and show us what to do to fight back.

— JD Vance, cover blurb, Unhumans: The Secret History of Communist Revolutions (and How to Crush Them)

== Reception ==
Reviewers have criticized the book. Michelle Goldberg decried the book as "fascist" and an "anti-democratic screed", notes that it lauds Franco and Pinochet, and says that "The book argues that leftists don't deserve the status of human beings – that they are, as the title says, unhumans – and that they are waging a shadow war against all that is good and decent, which will end in apocalyptic slaughter if they are not stopped".

David Corn also disliked the book, noting with disapprobation that it includes the American civil rights movement among "unhuman" plots, along with Black Lives Matter, and gives quotes from the book including "There is no way to reason with those who manipulate the have-nots en masse to loot and to shoot. They simply hate those who are good-looking and successful" and that these "ugly liars who hate and kill" are (in league with Big Tech) undertaking the "distinct revolutionary movement we are witnessing in the modern-day West". The book, according to Corn, describes the January 6 United States Capitol attack as a false-flag trap sprung as a "purge of Trump supporters... from public life", and also advises that law enforcement in red areas should target antifa, Black Lives Matter, and some NGOs, as "It is time to stop playing by rules they won't".

David Gardner also criticized the book, citing passages such as "By becoming consumed by nihilism, unhumans oppose everything that makes up humanity. As they are opposed to humanity itself..." and "Our study of history has brought us to this conclusion: Democracy has never worked to protect innocents from the unhumans".

Nathan J. Robinson wrote, "It is perhaps the most paranoid, hateful, and terrifying book I have ever picked up. (I say this as someone who has read Mein Kampf.)"

== See also ==
- Dawn's Early Light: Taking Back Washington to Save America
- Hillbilly Elegy – 2016 memoir by JD Vance
- Jewish Bolshevism, Nazi propaganda story
- List of anti-communist books
- Untermensch – German word meaning "subhuman", used by the Nazi Party
