= Mithril Capital =

American venture capital firm

Mithril Capital Management
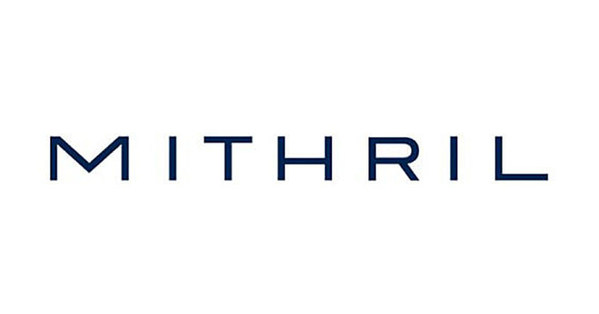
- Type: Private company
- Industry: Venture capital
- Founded: 2012; 14 years ago in San Francisco
- Founder: Ajay Royan and Peter Thiel
- Headquarters: Austin, Texas, United States
- Key people: Ajay Royan (Managing Director)
- Products: Private equity investments
- Website: mithril.com

Mithril Capital Management is an American venture capital firm founded by Peter Thiel and Ajay Royan in San Francisco in 2012. It was named after the fictional metal mithril.

== History ==
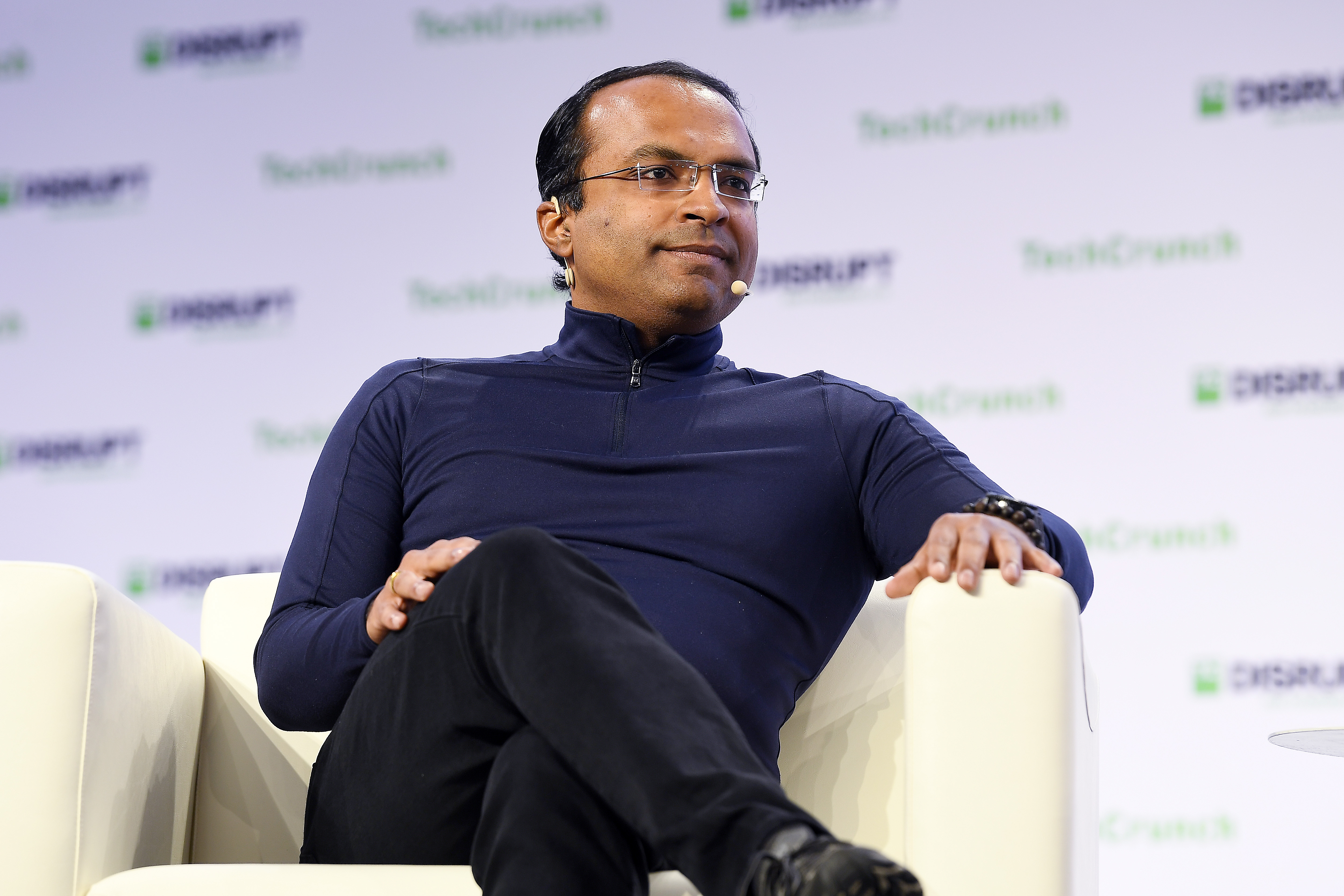
Royan at TechCrunch Disrupt, 2019

Thiel initially invested $100 million (the first fund of the firm was $402 million in total) and allowed Royan to run the firm. Thiel subsequently served as chair of the investment committee. Since its inception, Mithril has financially partnered with entities such as Temasek, the MacArthur Foundation, and the Sawiris family.

In 2018, Mithril relocated to Austin, Texas. In 2019, Mithril invested in Glance, an Indian software company owned by InMobi.

Mithril was conceptualized as complementing the Founders Fund's investments in early stage startups, but according to Bloomberg, from the start, the two firms have competed. The Founders Fund did not like that Mithril was too close to their Presidio campus. Later they clashed over the right to invest in Airbnb. After the Founders Fund got the deal, Thiel arranged for Mithril to invest in Palantir as compensation.

Around 2019, the firm was facing a series of conflicts among its personnel, leading to dissatisfaction from investors and reportedly, Thiel himself. Vox writes that, "The firm's troubles have disappointed Silicon Valley's highest-profile investor, according to multiple people close to Thiel, who has lent his brand name to the firm but is not operationally involved. And it has left a long list of scorned parties, slowly shrinking the firm's headcount of investors — despite having more than $1.3 billion in assets under management." Vox notes that at this time Thiel was heavily burdened by politics and did not have much time for his own firms. The firm's former lawyer Crystal McKellar and Ajay Royan launched mutual lawsuits against each other. According to McKellar, at one point, Thiel considered shutting the firm down, but relented when Royan appeared to recognize the problems. She also alleged that she tried to change the firm without results, and thus requested investigations by the FBI and the SEC, prompting the FBI to initiate an inquiry. In 2020, both McKellar's and Mithril's legal cases were withdrawn. Some investors also complained about the fact Royan had deployed only a quarter of the fund at the time, while some employees complained about Royan's sister and father being put on the company's payroll. Some others noted that their names were kept on the company's website even when they had left. Amidst the scandals, Royan moved Mithril's headquarters from San Francisco to Austin in January 2019 and hired a dozen new employees. The success of the Auris deal, as well as the fact Thiel and another major investor (as reported by Bloomberg) did not pull out, gave the company some relief though.

== Investments ==
- Palantir Technologies: Mithril is one of the companies Thiel uses to hold his Palantir shares. Mithril holds both Class A (common stock) and Class B (supervoting stock). Other entities holding Thiel's Palantir shares are PLTR Holdings, Founders Fund, STS Holdings, PT Ventures, Thiel Capital, Rivendell and the Founders Voting Trust (holder of Class F shares).
- MagForce USA: Berlin-based medical company. In 2014, Mithril invested $15M in the U.S.branch.
- Classy: fundraising platform acquired by GoFundMe in 2022.
- Glance: Indian software company. Mithril invested $45 million in 2019.
- C2FO: fintech company.
- Helion Energy: fusion energy company. The latest investment was in January 2025, when Mithril joined its $425 million round. Royan is on the board.
- Oklo: nuclear energy startup. Royan is on the board of director.
- BlackSky: Thiel and Royan hold shares of the dual-use satellite company through Mithril.
- Invivyd: developer of the monoclonal antibody Pemivibart. Mithril is a longtime holder of its shares. Royan has served on the board twice. He rejoined the board in March 2025.
- Forsight Robotics: Israeli eye surgery robotics company. Mithril joined its 2021 seed round and 2022 Series A.
- Fractyl Health: company working on treatment for metabolic diseases, that went public in 2024. Mithril is a longtime backer.
- Paxos: blockchain infrastructure provider, backed by Mithril and the Founders Fund.
- Auris Health: a surgical robotics company that is considered one of Mithril's best deals. Auris Health was acquired by Johnson & Johnson for over $3 billion in 2019, generating a return of at least $500 million for the fund. Bloomberg notes that, "But back in 2015, when investors were asked to commit to a second larger Mithril fund of $740 million, they didn't know Auris would be the largest acquisition of a venture-backed medical device company in history. They were mostly betting on Thiel’s reputation."

== Personnel ==
Leading figures of the company have included Brian Behlendorf, Crystal McKellar, Jim O'Neill and Matt Grimm.

Royan has led the firm since its foundation. His sister Anuja Royan is Mithril's chief financial director. Royan’s father also works for the firm as a consultant.

By the end of 2019, Venture Capital Journal notes that, of the 11 people featuring on Mithril's website four years ago (including Thiel and Royan), seven had already left the firm.

Brian Behlendorf worked at the firm between 2013 and 2016. Before Mithril, he was the CTO of the World Economic Forum. Later he led the Hyperledger project at the Linux Foundation. He currently serves as a board member at Mozilla Foundation and Electronic Frontier Foundation. He is a leading figure of the opensource movement.

Matt Grimm, who was a principal between 2014 and 2016, went to become Anduril's co-founder and COO in 2017. Sam Ecker, who had been an investor at Mithril since 2015, joined him at Anduril in October 2017.

McKellar started her own venture firm (Anathem, later renamed Aloft VC) and is able to maintain a cooperative relationship with Thiel, who taught her how to invest.

U.S. vice president JD Vance worked for the firm for a year. Vance went on to form Narya Capital alongside Mithril colleague Colin Greenspon in 2019. Before Mithril, Vance worked at a biotech company named Circuit Therapeutics, Inc. He tried to get Mithril to invest in the startup but Mithril passed. But Colin Greenspon, then managing director at Mithril, liked Vance and got him to move to Mithril in 2016. At Mithril, Vance clashed with Royan and decided to leave in 2017. Greenspon also left Mithril and joined Vance at Revolution LLC in 2018. Bloomberg notes that afterwards, Vance deleted all traces related to Mithril on his LinkedIn profile. Thiel backed Narya, together with Marc Andreessen and Eric Schmidt.

Jim O'Neill left in 2019, also after clash with Royan. O'Neill was close to Thiel, and he suggested that Royan saw him as "a potential rival who Royan believed threatened Thiel's perception" [of Royan].
