= Crystal McKellar =

Former American child actress and attorney

- Occupations: Attorney, actress, venture capitalist
- Years active: 1984–2002 (as actress); 2012–2019 (as lawyer); 2012–current (as venture capitalist)

Crystal McKellar (born 1975 or 1976) is an American attorney, former child actress and venture capital investor.

She is the sister of actress Danica McKellar.

== Early life ==
McKellar and her sister Danica were both students at the Diane Hill Hardin Young Actors Space school. The sisters sometimes competed against each other for roles, including Danica's role of Winnie Cooper on The Wonder Years. Crystal would go on to play Becky Slater, a recurring character and onetime love interest of Kevin Arnold. She was nominated for the Best Young Actress Guest Starring or Recurring Role In A Television Series award at the thirteenth annual Youth in Film Awards for her role in The Wonder Years, for the 1990–1991 season.

McKellar graduated from Yale University and obtained a M.St. at Corpus Christi College, Oxford. She graduated from Harvard Law School with a Juris Doctor degree in 2003 and worked as an associate attorney at Davis Polk and Morrison & Foerster.

== Venture capital investor ==
She worked as managing director and general counsel for Peter Thiel's venture capital fund Mithril Capital from 2012 to 2019.

After she left the firm, she launched a lawsuit against Mithril, claiming that her contract was wrongly terminated as retaliation over alerting authorities about fraud at the firm. She accused co-founder Ajay Royan of deceiving investors about portfolio company valuations. McKellar alleged that Thiel himself told her that he suspected that Royan was "suffering from a 'mental episode'" or was "engaged in a massive financial fraud", and that Thiel was considering shutting the firm down. The firm launched a countersuit, claiming that McKellar was trying to undermine Mithril with a letter writing campaign. A letter (sent to investors) allegedly accused Ajay Royan of "lying to investors and the public about how much" Royan charged in management fees. At the time many other employees complained about Royan's mismanagement and erratic behaviours, including Jim O'Neill, who claimed that his 2019 termination was orchestrated by Royan too. In 2020, both McKellar's and Mithril's legal cases were withdrawn.

In 2019, she launched her first solo fund, named after Neal Stephenson's scifi novel Anathem; it was later renamed as Aloft VC. According to Venture Capital Journal, she declared at the time that although her fund only had one general partner, it was supported by "three venture partners who backgrounds span robotics, computer science, enterprise software, viral consumer marketing, defense industry, and seed and venture investing." Her company focused on "companies that have developed breakthrough tech with strong IP protection."

In 2020, she led an investment round in Siren, a maker of "smart socks". The Axios notes that Thiel had chosen not to comment on the dispute between McKellar and Mithril, but his more prestigious firm, the Founders Fund, chose to invest alongside her.

Bloomberg referred to her as one of J.D. Vance's backers in the Silicon Valley, noting their relationship established at their former firm Mithril. She opined that, "He will be good for Silicon Valley because he is a good free market capitalist". She claimed that Thiel had seemingly seen something special in Vance and wanted to encourage it.

== Acting credits ==
- Fatal Judgement (1988 television film), as a nurse
- The Wonder Years (television series) as Becky Slater
- Paradise (television series) as Kathleen
- Judgment (1990 television film) as Sabine Guitry
- Hip, Edgy, Sexy, Cool (2002 film) as Actress in Class
