= Ramel Bradley =

American basketball player

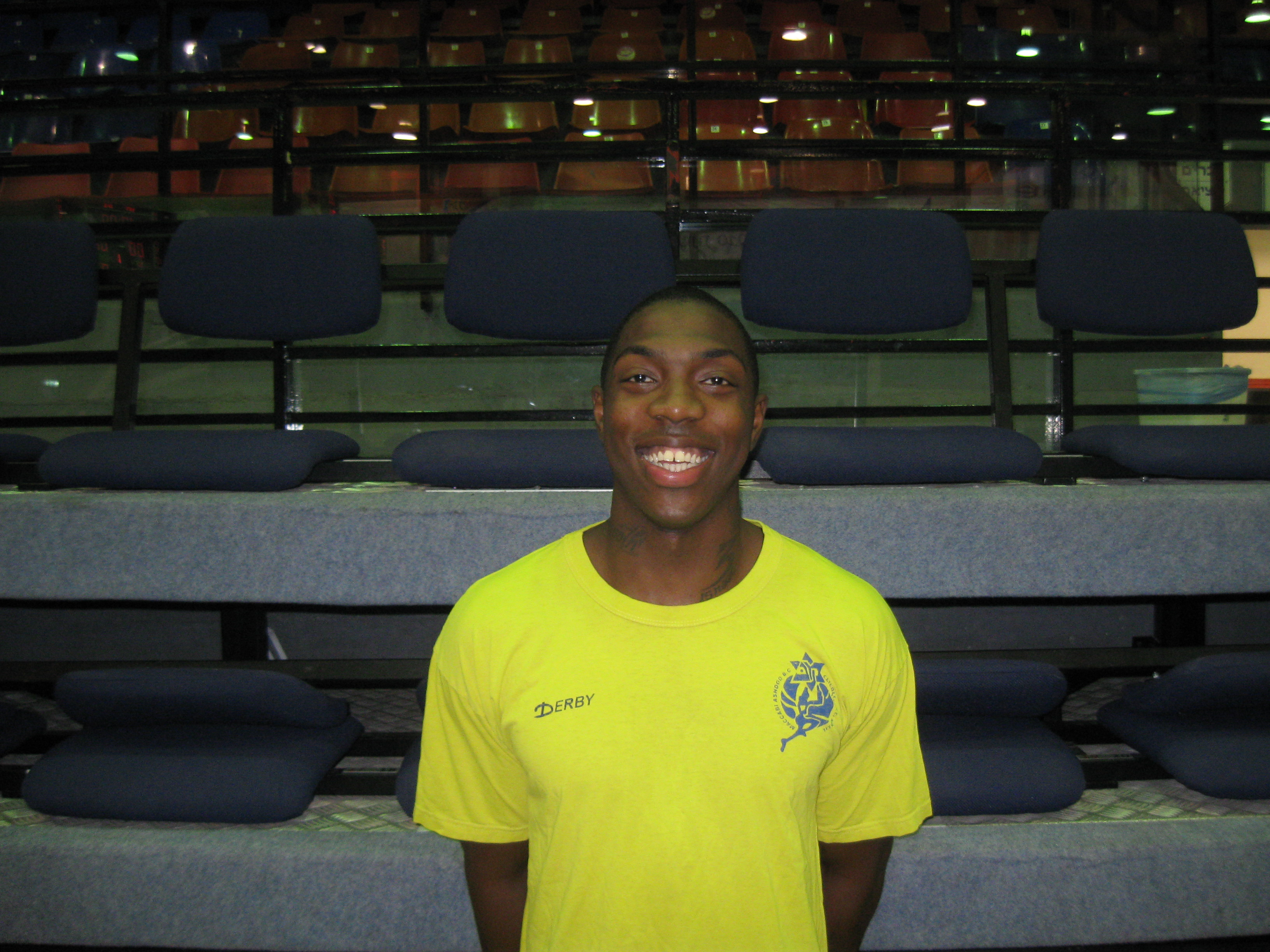

Free agent
- Position: Point guard / shooting guard

Personal information
- Born: February 5, 1985 (age 41) New York City, New York
- Listed height: 6 ft 3 in (1.91 m)
- Listed weight: 191 lb (87 kg)

Career information
- High school: IMG Academy (Bradenton, Florida)
- College: Kentucky (2004–2008)
- NBA draft: 2008: undrafted
- Playing career: 2008–2016

Career history
- 2008–2009: Cedevita Zagreb
- 2009–2010: JDA Dijon
- 2010–2011: Maccabi Ashdod
- 2011–2012: Hapoel Jerusalem
- 2012–2013: Berak Netanya
- 2013–2014: Türk Telekom
- 2014–2015: Yeşilgiresun Belediye
- 2015–2016: Hapoel Holon
- 2016: Ankara DSİ

Career highlights
- First-team All-SEC (2008)

Ramel "Smooth" Bradley (born February 5, 1985) is a retired American professional basketball player who last played for Ankara DSİ of the Turkish Basketball First League. He played college basketball at the University of Kentucky.

== High school ==
Bradley attended Manhattan Park West High School in New York City under coach Abram White, where he averaged 20.0 points, 8.0 rebounds and 6.0 assists per game as a senior. From there he spent a year at the Pendleton School at IMG Academy in Florida. He was then offered a scholarship to play at Kentucky, and was part of the recruiting class that included All-Americans Rajon Rondo, Joe Crawford, and Randolph Morris.

== College ==
Although he was not a starter as a freshman, he played in every game and averaged 5.8 points per game during Southeastern Conference play. By his sophomore season, he was averaging 7.9 points per game but was forced out with a broken left hand towards the end of the season. He averaged 13.4 points during his junior season, and opted to return for his senior season, despite the departure of Tubby Smith. Bradley exploded to average 20+ PPG in SEC play his senior season.

== After college ==
Ramel Bradley was invited by the New Jersey Nets to play in the NBA Summer League, because the New Jersey Nets liked his effort he gave in workouts and other basketball camps in which Bradley participated. He started playing European basketball in Zagreb, Croatia for the Cedevita Zagreb team, where he wore the number twelve. Ramel averaged 15.1 points and 2.4 assists during 2008–2009 season with Cedevita.

On June 28, 2009, Ramel Bradley signed with a French PRO-A team JDA Dijon. He played the entire 2009–2010 season with the team, averaging 12.0 points, 3.7 assists, 2.7 rebounds and 1.0 steal per appearance.

On August 10, 2010, Bradley signed to play for the Israeli team Maccabi Ashdod. After the eighteenth game of the season Bradley suffered a knee injury that forced him to undergo a surgery and miss the rest of the season.

On January 26, 2012, after playing twelve games for Maccabi Ashdod at the beginning of 2011–2012 season, Bradley signed with the team of Hapoel Jerusalem. He had his debut on the 29th with a winning of Hapoel over Barak Netanya.

On August 5, 2012, after playing the last season at Maccabi Ashdod and Hapoel Jerusalem, Bradley stayed in the Israeli Top League and signed to play for Barak Netanya.

== Non-basketball activities ==
Bradley, who graduated from UK with a degree in agriculture, has moved back to Kentucky in 2017 and is with an organization in eastern Kentucky called AppHarvest that is promoting agriculture in Appalachia. They are building greenhouses, as well as educating high school students in agriculture.
