= Revita =

Revita may refer to:

- An endoscopic outpatient procedure developed by American healthcare company Fractyl Health
- Revita (video game), 2022 platform video game
- Tandyo Budi Revita, Indonesian army general
