= Narya Capital =

American venture capital firm

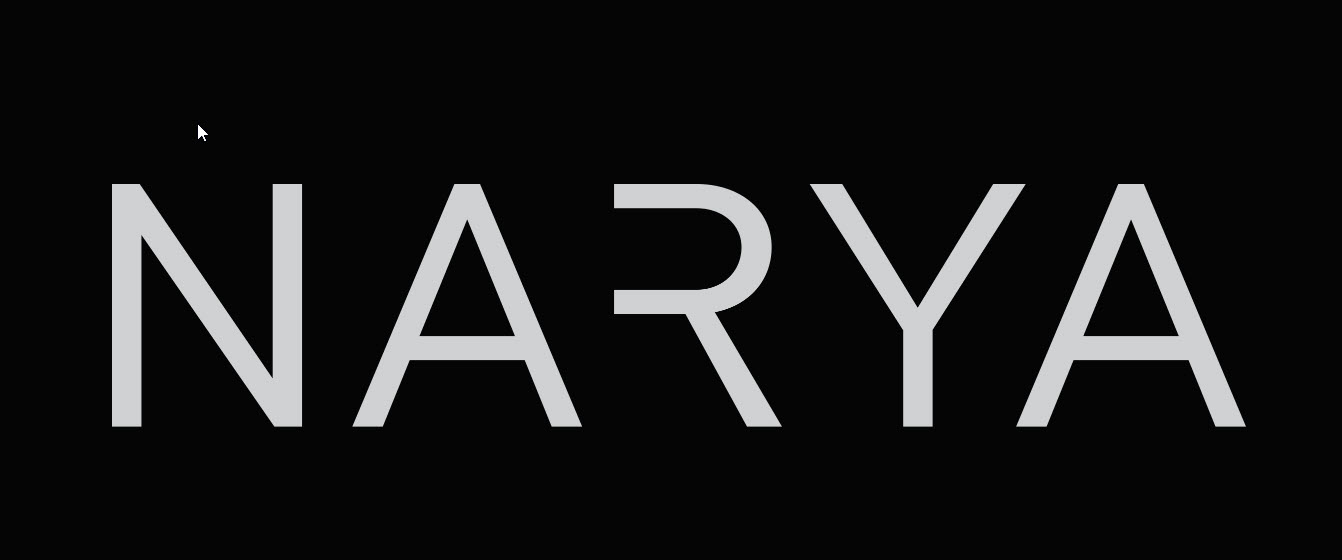
- Type: Private company
- Industry: Venture capital
- Founded: 2019; 7 years ago in Cincinnati
- Founder: JD Vance and Colin Greenspon
- Headquarters: Columbus, Ohio, United States
- Key people: Falon Donohue (Partner)
- Products: Private equity investments
- Website: naryavc.com//

Narya Capital is a venture capital company that focuses on investing in early-stage technology companies. It was founded in 2019 in Cincinnati by JD Vance and Colin Greenspon (previously at Mithril Capital) with financial backing from Peter Thiel, Eric Schmidt, Marc Andreessen and Scott Dorsey. Falon Donohue (VentureOhio, Sadie Ventures) joined later as partner.

In 2020, Vance raised $93 million for the firm.

== Name ==
Narya is named after the "Ring of Fire" (Narya) from J.R.R. Tolkien's fantasy novel Lord of the Rings, reflecting the influence of Peter Thiel, who has other financial endeavors with names inspired from Tolkien fantasy: Mithril Capital (mithril), Palantir Technologies (palantír), Valar Ventures (Valar).

== Investments ==
Narya is among the top ten investors in the video platform startup Rumble, with a seat on the board (first investment was made in 2022). It partially divested from Rumble in September 2023, with a profit of almost $25m.

Narya Capital invested in AcreTrader, a platform for buying U.S. farmland, acquired by Proterra Investment Partners in August 2025.

== See also ==
- Peter Thiel
