= JD Vance =

Vice President of the United States since 2025

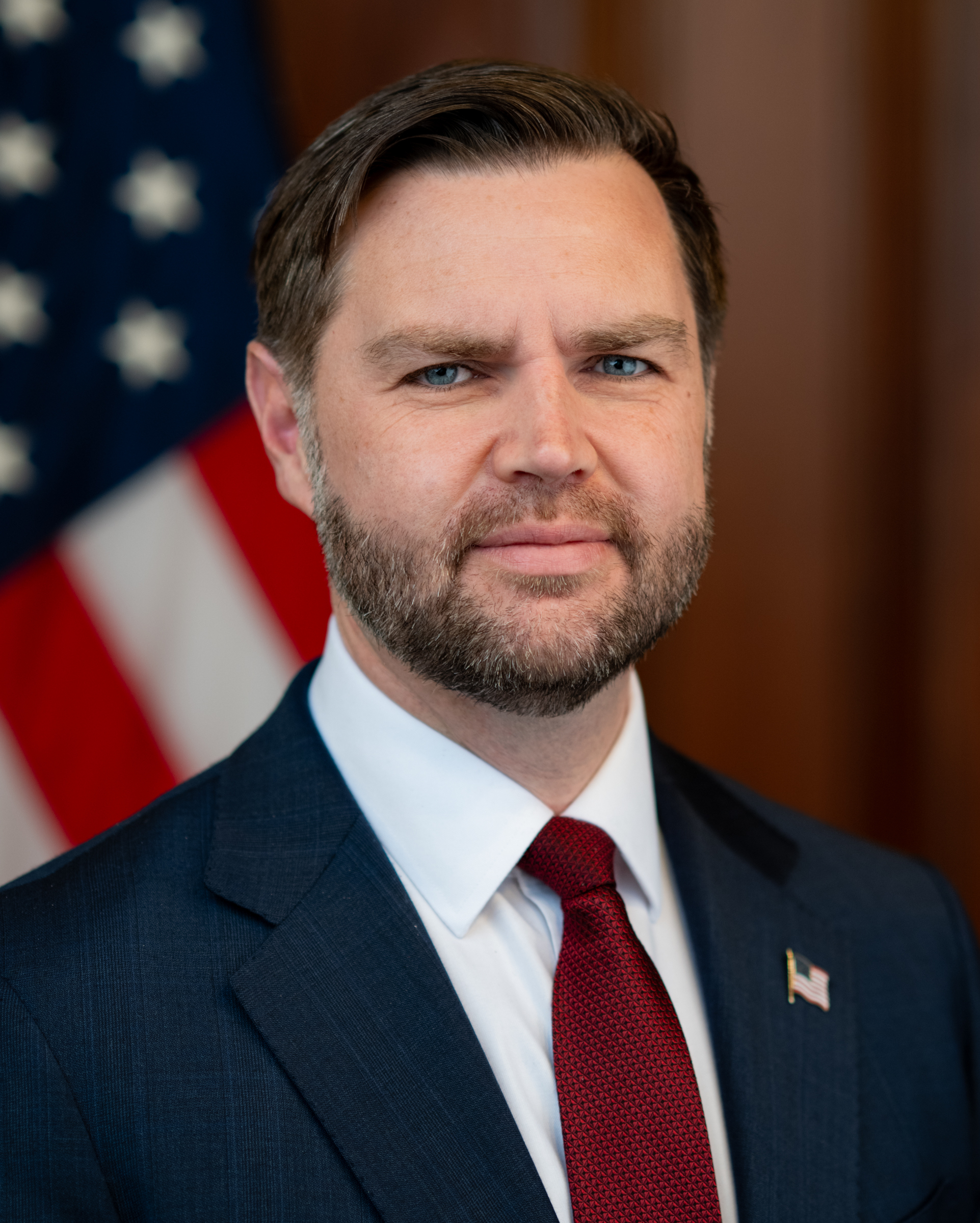
- Official portrait, 2026

50th Vice President of the United States
- Incumbent
- Assumed office January 20, 2025
- President: Donald Trump
- Preceded by: Kamala Harris

Finance Chair of the Republican National Committee
- Incumbent
- Assumed office March 18, 2025
- Preceded by: Duke Buchan

United States Senator from Ohio
- In office January 3, 2023 – January 10, 2025
- Preceded by: Rob Portman
- Succeeded by: Jon Husted

Personal details
- Born: James Donald Bowman (Note: Vance was named James Donald Bowman at birth. Afterward, he was adopted by his mother's third husband and had his name changed to James David Hamel. In April 2013, he adopted his maternal grandparents' surname of Vance.); August 2, 1984 (age 42) Middletown, Ohio, U.S.
- Party: Republican
- Spouse: Usha Chilukuri (m. 2014)
- Children: 4
- Parents: Donald Bowman; Beverly Vance
- Relatives: Vance family
- Education: The Ohio State University (BA); Yale University (JD)
- Occupation: Politician; author

Military service
- Branch/service: United States Marine Corps
- Years of service: 2003–2007
- Rank: Corporal
- Unit: 2nd Marine Aircraft Wing
- Battles/wars: Iraq War
- Awards: Navy and Marine Corps Achievement Medal; Marine Corps Good Conduct Medal
- Vance's voice Vance speaking on the technological impact of artificial intelligence Recorded March 18, 2025

James David Vance (born James Donald Bowman; August 2, 1984) is an American politician, author, venture capitalist, and Marine Corps veteran serving as the 50th vice president of the United States. A member of the Republican Party, he represented the state of Ohio in the United States Senate from 2023 to 2025.

Vance was born and raised in Middletown, Ohio, and grew up in an unstable, low-income family. After graduating from Middletown High School, he enlisted in the U.S. Marine Corps in 2003, and served as a military journalist in public affairs until 2007. He earned a bachelor's degree from Ohio State University and a Juris Doctor from Yale Law School. After a brief career in corporate law, he worked for Peter Thiel's venture capital firm Mithril Capital.

Vance rose to national prominence with his 2016 memoir, Hillbilly Elegy, which received widespread attention as scholars and journalists sought to understand white working-class disaffection after Donald Trump's election. The book spoke to a broader political realignment sweeping post-industrial Appalachia and the Midwest, and was adapted into a film in 2020. He grew up a Protestant, but converted to Roman Catholicism in 2019. He is the second Catholic vice president of the United States, after Joe Biden. Vance was originally critical of Trump's candidacy, but became a strong supporter while running for Senate. He was elected to the Senate in 2022, defeating Democratic nominee Tim Ryan in the general election after winning a crowded Republican primary with Trump's endorsement.

Vance was selected as Trump's running mate in the 2024 presidential election and resigned from the Senate before his inauguration as vice president. He became the first Marine Corps veteran, the first Iraq War veteran, and first millennial in U.S. history to serve as vice president. During his tenure as vice president, he has also served as finance chair of the Republican National Committee. He has been described as a national conservative and right-wing populist, aligning himself with the "postliberal" New Right movement. Vance supports Immigration and Customs Enforcement (ICE) operations, and opposes immigration, abortion, childlessness, gender-affirming care for minors, and gun control.

== Early life and education ==
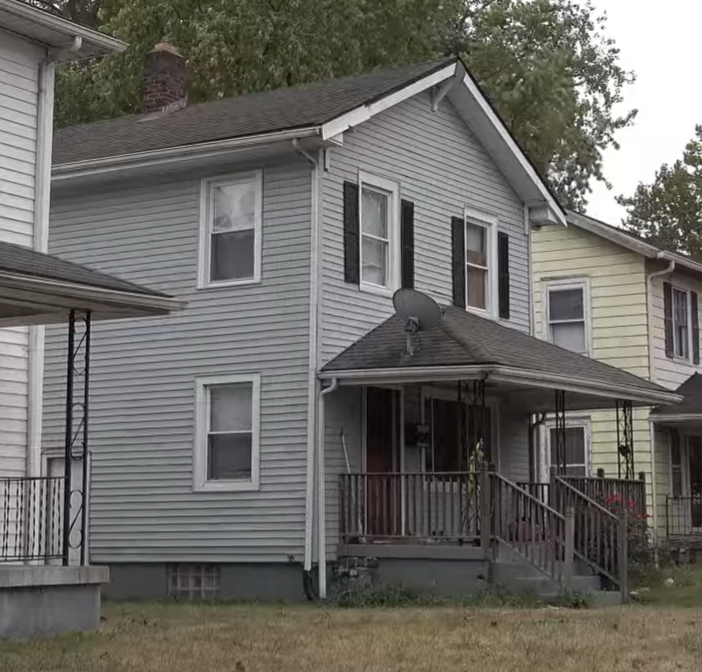
Vance's childhood home in Middletown, Ohio

Vance was born James Donald Bowman on August 2, 1984, in Middletown, Ohio, the city in which he was also raised. His mother is Beverly Carol Aikins (née Vance), and his father was Donald Ray Bowman (1959–2023); they divorced when he was a toddler. Vance wrote in his book Hillbilly Elegy that he was of Scots-Irish descent. He grew up in an Appalachian American culture, spending summers with relatives in Jackson, Kentucky.

Vance attended Roosevelt Elementary School and Vail Middle School, which were demolished in 2008 and 2012, respectively. He briefly attended West Elkton Elementary School for fourth grade. Vance has written that his childhood was marked by poverty and abuse, and that his mother struggled with drug addiction. She worked as a registered nurse when Vance was a toddler, where she reportedly got addicted to pharmaceutical drugs after one of her co-workers offered her Vicodin for a headache. Soon thereafter, she was fired and lost her nursing license after she got caught stealing morphine. He and his elder sister, Lindsay, were raised primarily by their maternal grandparents, James Lee Vance (1929–1997) and Bonnie Eloise Blanton (1933–2005), whom they called "Papaw" and "Mamaw". In 1990, after he was adopted by his mother's third husband, Bob Hamel, his mother changed his name to James David Hamel to remove his biological father's first name and surname and to use an uncle's first name, David. Vance therefore kept his first name and his nickname, JD. He eventually changed his surname to his mother's maiden name, Vance, in April 2013.

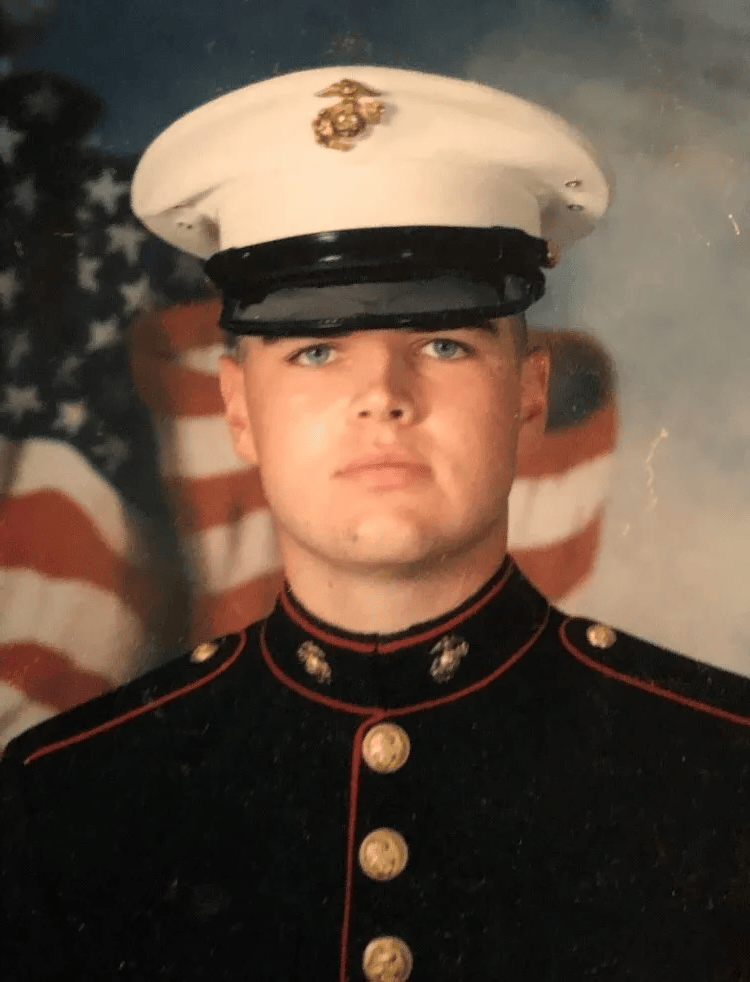
Vance (then Hamel) enlisted in the U.S. Marine Corps in 2003 at age 19.

Vance attended Middletown High School from 1999 until he graduated in 2003 with an honors diploma. In 2007, he began studying at Ohio State University, where he graduated with highest honors in 2009 with a Bachelor of Arts in political science and philosophy. In 2010, Vance entered Yale Law School, where he won a staff position on The Yale Law Journal and worked with a group of its editors who primarily checked citations. Vance's future wife was the journal's executive developmental editor. At Yale, he befriended fellow Ohio native and future Republican politician Vivek Ramaswamy. During his first year, Professor Amy Chua persuaded Vance to begin writing his memoir, Hillbilly Elegy.

Vance also initiated a rapport with Peter Thiel after attending his 2011 talk at Yale. In 2010–2011, Vance wrote for David Frum's "FrumForum" website under the name J. D. Hamel. Although Hillbilly Elegy says he adopted his grandparents' surname of Vance upon his marriage in 2014, the name change actually occurred in April 2013 (his full name therefore changing to James David Vance), as he was about to graduate from Yale. Vance obtained his Juris Doctor degree from Yale Law School in May 2013 and was admitted to the bar in Kentucky later that year.

=== Military service ===
After graduating from high school, Vance enlisted in the United States Marine Corps as a private, serving as a combat correspondent (military journalist) with the 2nd Marine Aircraft Wing. During his four years of service, he was deployed to Iraq in 2005 for six months in a non-combat role, writing articles and taking photographs. In December 2005, he was part of a group of Marines that held a roundtable discussion with Vice President Dick Cheney. He attained the rank of corporal, and his decorations include the Marine Corps Good Conduct Medal and the Navy and Marine Corps Achievement Medal. In 2007, Vance left the military and used the G. I. Bill to study at Ohio State.

== Career ==
After graduating from law school, Vance worked for Republican senator John Cornyn. He spent a year as a law clerk for Judge David Bunning of the U.S. District Court for the Eastern District of Kentucky, then worked at the law firm Sidley Austin, beginning a brief career as a corporate lawyer. Having practiced law for slightly under two years, Vance moved to San Francisco to work in the technology industry as a venture capitalist. Between 2016 and 2017, he was a principal at Peter Thiel's firm, Mithril Capital.

In June 2016, Harper published Vance's book, Hillbilly Elegy: A Memoir of a Family and Culture in Crisis. The memoir recounts the Appalachian culture and socioeconomic problems of Vance's upbringing. Hillbilly Elegy was on The New York Times Best Seller list in 2016 and 2017. The Times listed it among "6 Books to Help Understand Trump's Win", and Vance was profiled in The Washington Post, which called him "the voice of the Rust Belt". In The New Republic, Sarah Jones criticized Vance as "liberal media's favorite white trash–splainer" and a "false prophet of blue America", calling the book "little more than a list of myths about welfare queens". Hillbilly Elegy's success helped propel Vance into contact with social elites, and he began writing a column for The New York Times. Vance later said that his interactions with social elites from this time, particularly their perceived disdain for "the people he grew up with", helped shape his later views.

Vance worked at a biotech company named Circuit Therapeutics from 2015 to 2017. Its chairman, Frederic Moll, said he hired Vance for his intelligence, legal qualifications, and connection to Thiel. Vance tried to get Mithril Capital to invest in Circuit but Mithril passed. Colin Greenspon, then managing director at Mithril, liked Vance and got him to move to Mithril in 2016. At Mithril, Vance clashed with Mithril's co-founder and managing director Ajay Royan. He decided to leave in 2017. Bloomberg reports he deleted all traces of Mithril from his LinkedIn profile. Vance moved back to Ohio, where he published an op-ed in The New York Times with the headline "Why I'm moving home", in which he complained about "highly educated transplants" in Silicon Valley. In another interview, he said elite tech crowds wielded "political-financial power in combination with a certain condescension". In 2017, Vance joined Revolution LLC, an investment firm founded by Steve Case. Greenspon left Mithril and joined Vance at Revolution in 2018. At Revolution, Vance was tasked with expanding the "Rise of the Rest" initiative, which focuses on growing investments in underserved regions outside Silicon Valley and New York City.

Vance was a CNN contributor from 2017 to 2018.

In 2017, Vance sold the film rights to Hillbilly Elegy to Imagine Entertainment. In April 2017, Ron Howard signed on to direct the film version, which was released in select theaters on November 11, 2020, and later that month on Netflix.

In 2019, Vance was on the board of advisors of the With Honor Fund, a Super PAC that helps veterans run for office. From 2020 to 2023, he was on the board of advisors of American Moment, a networking and training organization for young conservatives that is affiliated with Project 2025.

In 2019, Vance and Chris Buskirk co-founded the conservative political advocacy group Rockbridge Network. That year, he also co-founded venture capital firm Narya Capital in Cincinnati with financial backing from Thiel, Eric Schmidt, and Marc Andreessen. In 2020, he raised $93 million for the firm. With Thiel and former Trump adviser Darren Blanton, Vance invested in Rumble, a Canadian online video platform popular with the political right.

=== Our Ohio Renewal ===
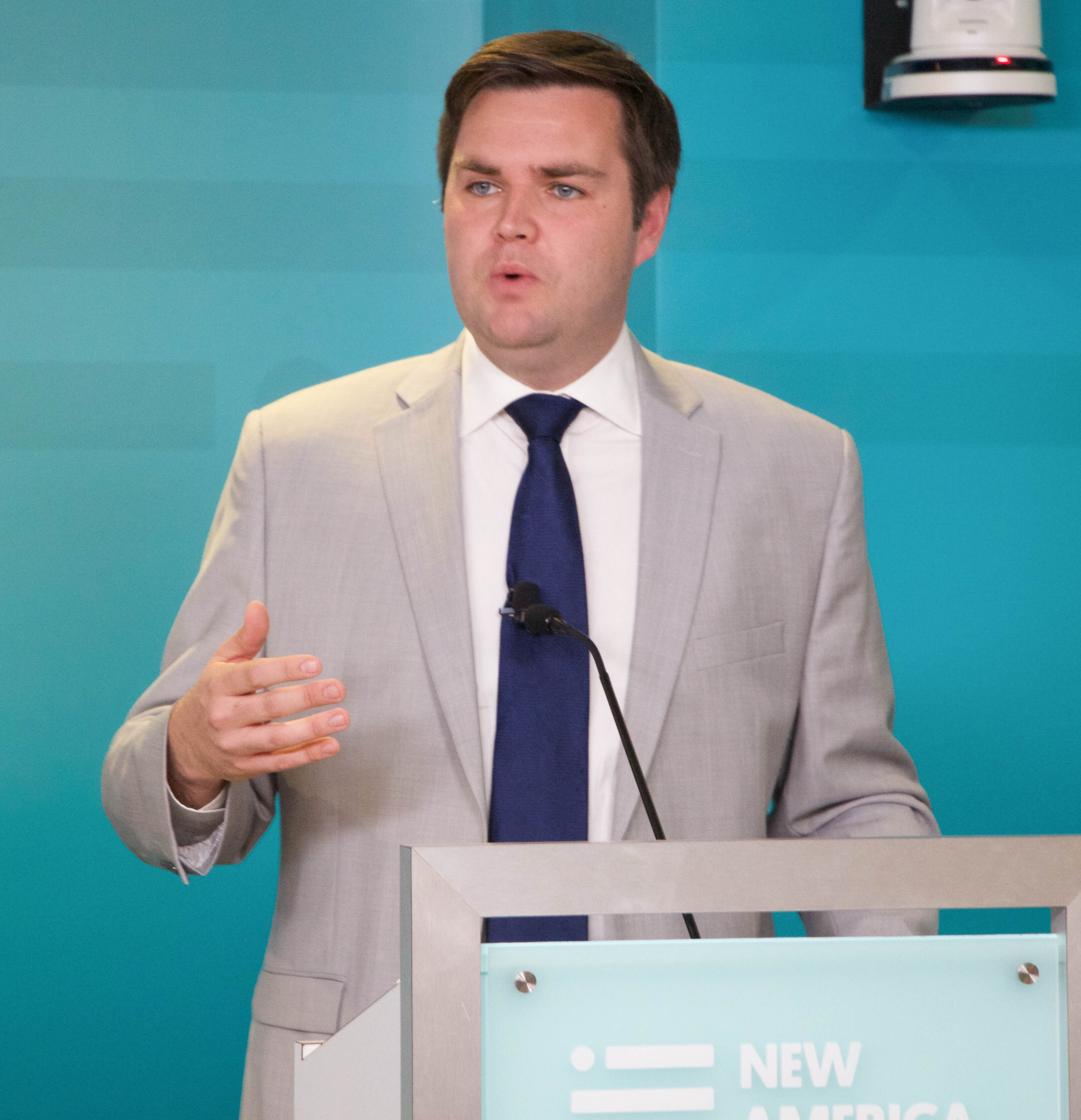
Vance speaking about his book Hillbilly Elegy at New America's Securing the American Dream for Young Children event in 2017

In December 2016, Vance said he planned to move to Ohio and would consider starting a nonprofit or running for office. In Ohio, he started Our Ohio Renewal, a 501(c)(4) advocacy organization focused on education, addiction, and other "social ills" he had mentioned in his memoir. According to a 2017 archived capture of the nonprofit's website, the advisory board members were Keith Humphreys, Jamil Jivani, Yuval Levin, and Sally Satel. According to a 2020 capture of the website, those four remained in those positions throughout the organization's existence. Our Ohio Renewal closed by 2021 with sparse achievements. According to Jivani, the organization's director of law and policy, its work was derailed by Jivani's cancer diagnosis. It raised around $221,000 in 2017 (including $80,000 from Vance himself) and spent most of its revenue on overhead costs and travel. In subsequent years, it raised less than $50,000.

During Vance's 2022 U.S. Senate campaign, Tim Ryan, the Democratic nominee, said the charity was a front for Vance's political ambitions, pointing to reports that the organization paid a Vance political adviser and conducted public opinion polling, while its efforts to address addiction failed. Vance denied the characterization. (Note: By 2021, the ourohiorenewal.com domain was put on sale. The Ohio Democratic Party set up a website at ourohioripoff.com in 2022 and redirected the former site to it through at least November 2024. As of 2026, both domains were for sale.) Our Ohio Renewal's tax filings show that in its first year, it spent more (over $63,000) on "management services" provided by its executive director Jai Chabria, who became Vance's chief campaign strategist, than it did on programs to fight opioid abuse. In 2017, Vance formed a similarly named 501(c)(3) organization, Our Ohio Renewal Foundation, which raised around $69,000 from 2017 to 2023. As of September 2024, the foundation had not spent any funds since 2019.

According to the Associated Press (AP) and a 2019 ProPublica investigation, the charity's biggest accomplishment, sending psychiatrist Sally Satel to Ohio's Appalachian region for a yearlong residency in 2018, was "tainted" by the ties among Satel, her employer, American Enterprise Institute (AEI), and Purdue Pharma, in the form of knowledge exchange between Satel and Purdue and financial support from Purdue to AEI. Satel denied having any relationship with Purdue or any knowledge of its donations to AEI.

=== AppHarvest ===
From March 2017 to April 2021, Vance was on the board of directors of the startup AppHarvest, which carried out indoor vertical farming in Kentucky. AppHarvest was also one of Narya Capital's first publicly announced investments; Vance publicly advocated for AppHarvest, touting the company's commitment to bring good jobs with health care benefits to an economically depressed area of Appalachia. AppHarvest went bankrupt in 2023 while owing over $340 million. Company founder Jonathan Webb and top executives collectively had little experience with horticulture and indoor agriculture, and the company struggled to meet its produce buyers' standards. Workers complained to authorities about "brutal" working conditions in company greenhouses; after many local workers quit, they were replaced by migrant contract workers, who eventually constituted over half the company's labor force. Vance never held an operational role at the company, and his vice-presidential campaign said he had been unaware of the complaints about working conditions and that the decision to hire migrants was made after he resigned from the board.

== U.S. Senate (2023–2025) ==
=== 2022 campaign ===
Final results by Ohio county in 2022: JD Vance: 80–90%; 70–80%; 60–70%; 50–60%; Tim Ryan: 60–70%; 50–60%

In early 2018, Vance considered running for the U.S. Senate against Sherrod Brown, but did not. In March 2021, Peter Thiel gave $10 million to Protect Ohio Values, a super PAC created in February to support a potential Vance candidacy. Robert Mercer also gave an undisclosed amount. In April, Vance expressed interest in running for the Senate seat being vacated by Rob Portman. In May, he launched an exploratory committee.

Vance announced his Senate campaign in Ohio on July 1, 2021. On May 3, 2022, he won the Republican primary with 32% of the vote, defeating multiple candidates, including Josh Mandel (24%) and Matt Dolan (23%). On November 8, in the general election, Vance defeated Democratic nominee Tim Ryan with 53% of the vote to Ryan's 47%. This vote share was considered a vast underperformance compared to other Ohio Republicans, especially in the coinciding gubernatorial election. Vance had often previously spelled his name with periods after his initials ("J.D.")—including in the publication of Hillbilly Elegy—but after becoming a candidate for office, he removed the periods ("JD").

=== Tenure ===
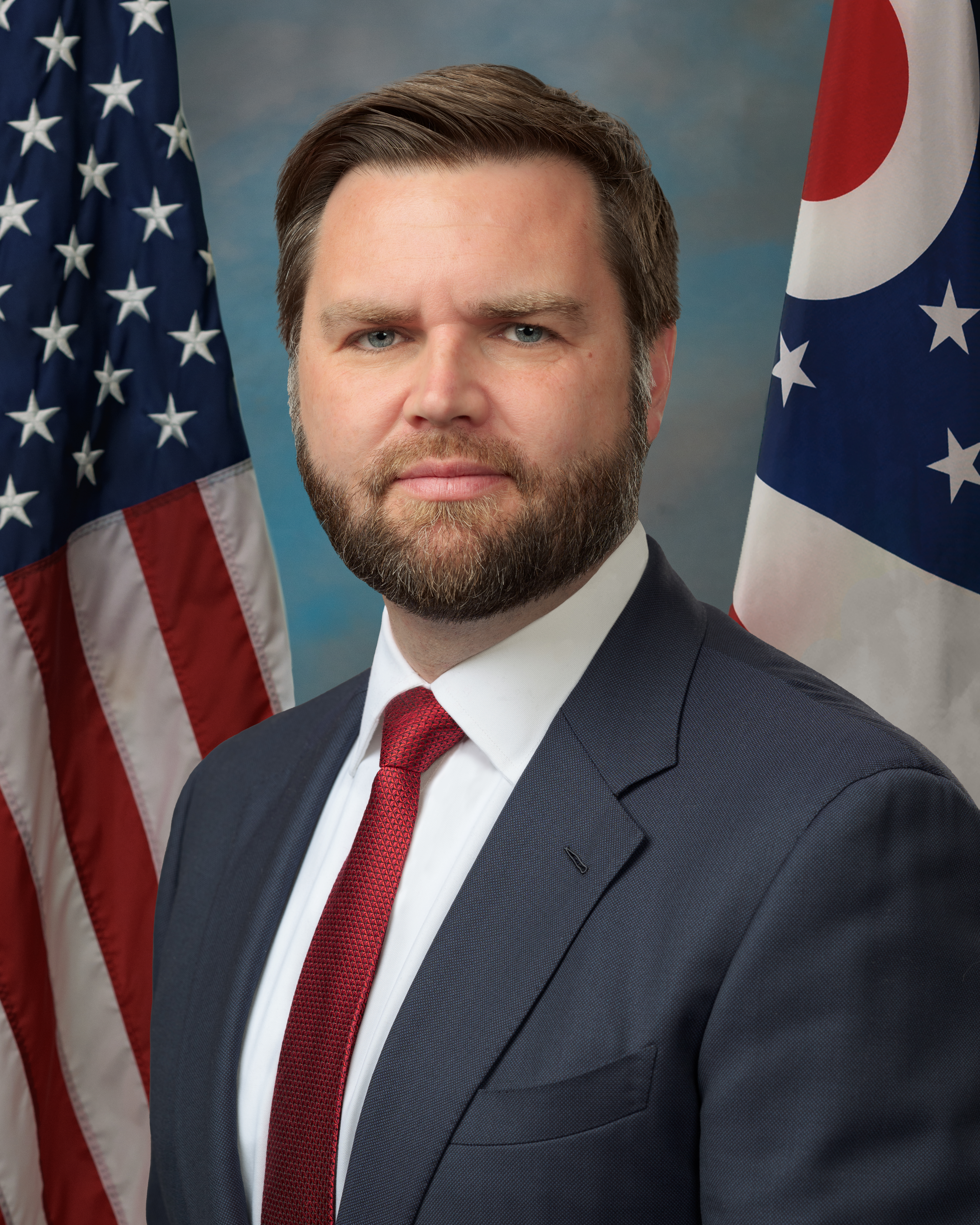
Official Senate portrait, 2023

On January 3, 2023, Vance was sworn into the Senate as a member of the 118th United States Congress. Vance was Ohio's junior senator from January 3, 2023, to January 3, 2025. Data from mid-July 2024 showed that Vance had made 45 Senate speeches and sponsored 57 legislative bills, none of which had passed the Senate. Vance had also co-sponsored 288 bills, of which two passed both the Senate and the House but were vetoed by Biden. He attended Biden's 2023 State of the Union Address.

On March 1, 2023, Vance and Senator Sherrod Brown co-sponsored bipartisan legislation to prevent derailments like the one in East Palestine, but the bill failed due to lack of intra-caucus Republican support. In June 2023, Vance voted against raising the debt ceiling, standing against final passage of the Fiscal Responsibility Act of 2023 and saying it would result in "a reduced military in the face of a rising threat from China".

In July 2023, Vance and Representative Marjorie Taylor Greene introduced legislation that would have made gender-affirming care for minors a federal crime, with penalties of up to 12 years in prison. In June 2024, Vance sponsored the Dismantle DEI Act, which would ban federal diversity, equity, and inclusion programs and funding for agencies, contractors, and organizations receiving federal funds. Vance was not present for any Senate votes during his vice-presidential campaign.

Vance became Ohio's senior senator on January 3, 2025, upon the swearing-in of Bernie Moreno. At midnight on January 10, Vance resigned from the Senate in anticipation of his inauguration as vice president of the United States on January 20. On January 17, Governor Mike DeWine announced his appointment of Jon Husted to the Senate seat Vance vacated.

==== Committee assignments ====
Vance was named to the Senate Committee on Banking, Housing, and Urban Affairs, on Financial Institutions and Consumer Protection, on Housing, Transportation, and Community Development, and on Securities, Insurance, and Investment. He was also assigned to the Senate Committee on Commerce, Science, and Transportation, on Communications, Media, and Broadband, on Oceans, Fisheries, Climate Change, and Manufacturing, and on Space and Science. He was additionally assigned to the Senate Special Committee on Aging.

== 2024 presidential election ==
=== Vice-presidential campaign ===
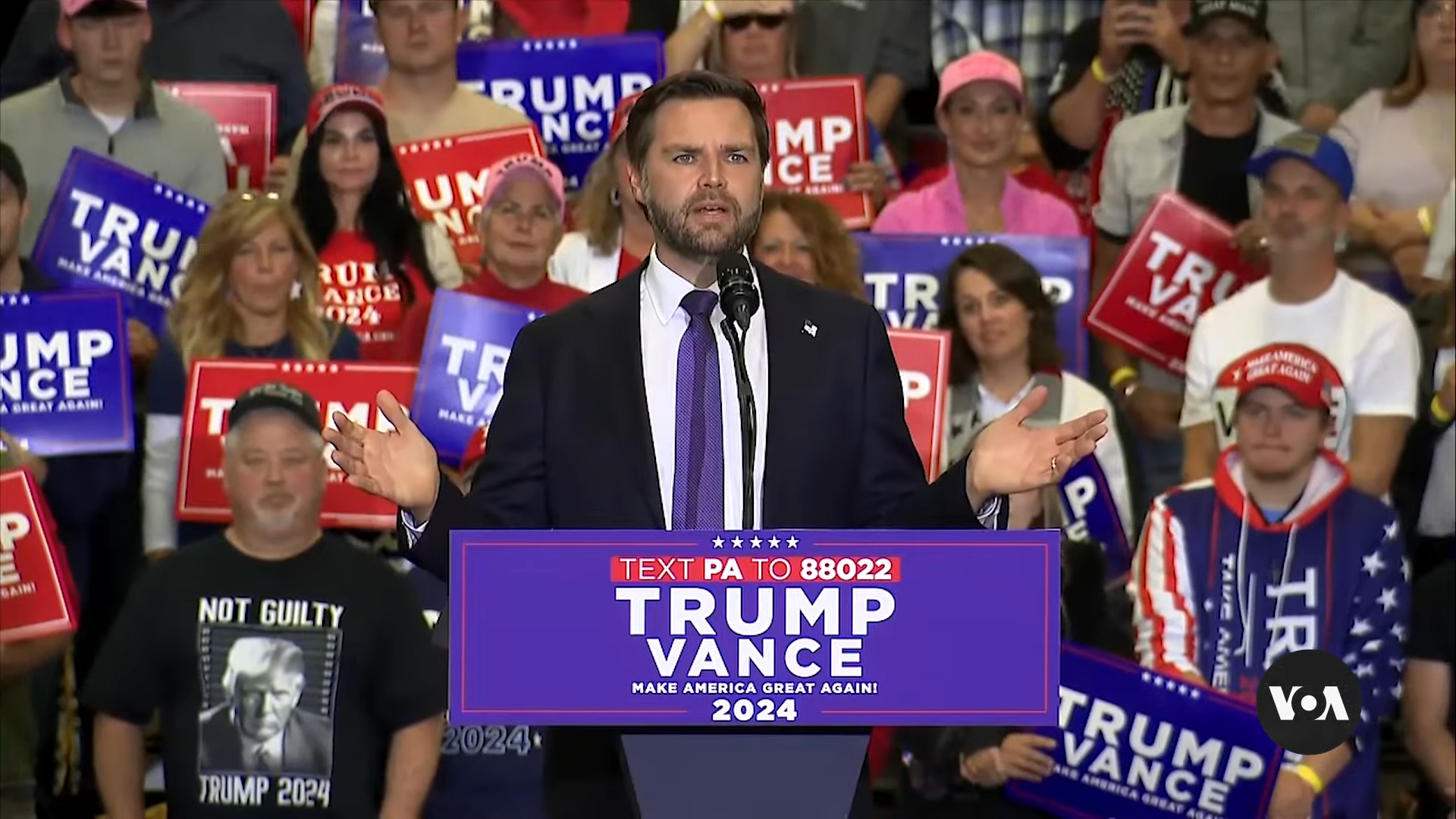
Vance speaking at a rally in Wilmington, North Carolina in October 2024

On January 31, 2023, Vance endorsed former president Donald Trump in the 2024 Republican Party presidential primaries. On July 15, 2024, the first day of the Republican National Convention, Trump announced on Truth Social that he had chosen Vance as his running mate. On July 17, the third day of the convention, Vance accepted the nomination to be Trump's running mate.

Along with Vance, North Dakota governor Doug Burgum, Florida senator Marco Rubio, and South Carolina senator Tim Scott were finalists to be Trump's running mate. Trump's two eldest sons, Donald Trump Jr. and Eric Trump, advocated for Vance. Several media and industry figures are said to have lobbied for Vance to be on the ticket, including Elon Musk, David O. Sacks, Tucker Carlson, and Peter Thiel, who first introduced Trump to Vance in 2021. The Heritage Foundation, which drafted Project 2025, privately advocated for Vance. Musk responded to Trump's vice-presidential pick hours after its announcement, saying the ticket "resounds with victory". David Sacks, a prominent GOP donor and Silicon Valley venture capitalist, wrote on Twitter: "This is who I want by Trump's side: an American patriot." In 2022, Sacks gave a super PAC supporting Vance's Senate campaign $900,000, and Thiel added $15 million. It was initially reported that Musk would contribute $45 million monthly to the Trump-Vance campaign, but Musk later said he planned to donate "much lower amounts".

On May 15, 2024, Trump attended a $50,000 per head private fundraising dinner with Vance in Cincinnati. Guests included Chris Bortz and Republican fundraiser Nate Morris. Vance appeared at significant conservative political events and in June was described as a potential running mate for Trump. In July, a former friend of Vance's from Yale Law School exposed to the media communications between them and Vance from 2014 to 2017, with the friend alleging that Vance has "changed [his] opinion on literally every imaginable issue that affects everyday Americans" in pursuit of "political power and wealth".

In late July 2024, after President Joe Biden withdrew his candidacy for reelection and Vice President Kamala Harris became a presidential candidate, Vance said at a private fundraiser that the "bad news is that Kamala Harris does not have the same baggage as Joe Biden ... Kamala Harris is obviously not struggling in the same ways that Joe Biden did"; a day later, Vance told the media, "I don't think the political calculus changes at all" with Harris as the Democratic nominee. After criticism of his past remarks and political positions, Vance said in an August 2024 interview that a vice president "doesn't really matter" and that Harris "has been a bad vice president". This came after Trump said that the "vice president, in terms of the election, does not have any impact". In late August, after Trump's campaign was embroiled in controversy for allegedly bringing cameras into a restricted area of Arlington National Cemetery during Trump's visit there, Vance first said that Harris "can go to hell" because "she wants to yell at Donald Trump because he showed up", and then said "Don't do this fake outrage thing". At the time of his comments, Harris had not publicly discussed the incident.

In August 2024, Vance said that Trump had "said that explicitly that he would" veto a national abortion ban. In September 2024, during his debate with Harris, Trump was asked about Vance's statement about the veto, and responded: "I didn't discuss it with JD ... I think he was speaking for me—but I really didn't."

Vance received significant media attention during the election for repeating false claims that immigrants in Springfield, Ohio, were eating people's pets. When challenged on the factual basis of the claims, Vance told interviewer Dana Bash, "If I have to create stories so that the American media actually pays attention to the suffering of the American people, then that's what I'm going to do." In a 2021 interview with Tucker Carlson, Vance said the country was being run by "a bunch of childless cat ladies who are miserable at their own lives and the choices that they've made and so they want to make the rest of the country miserable, too" and criticized some Democrats for not having children. NPR reported that his comments were going "viral" and had received bipartisan criticism.

In late September 2024, Vance spoke at a western Pennsylvania town hall event organized by Lance Wallnau, who has promoted election denialism and called Kamala Harris a "demon". In October 2024, Vance said he did not believe Trump lost the 2020 presidential election and that he believed "Big Tech rigged the election" through censorship.

=== Vice-presidential debate ===
The vice presidential debate was held on Tuesday, October 1, 2024, at 9:00 p.m. EDT at the CBS Broadcast Center in New York City.

CBS stated in late September that the moderators would not fact-check the candidates during the debate, with fact-checking instead handled online and on-air only after the debate. When Vance was fact checked on the status of Haitian immigrants in Springfield, Ohio, he objected saying, "The rules were that you were not going to fact check", and argued that the immigrants should not be considered legal because the federal government decided their protected status after they had arrived in the United States. Walz rejected Vance's argument, and the microphones were muted as Vance continued speaking.

Nielsen Media Research reported that 43 million viewers across CBS and 15 other television networks watched the debate, down from 57 million viewers during the 2020 vice presidential debate.

=== Opinion polls ===
In July 2024, a CNN poll analysis after the Republican National Convention showed a net-negative approval rating for Vance. That week, Vance's middling public reception and other concerns led some prominent Republican politicians and political analysts to say that he may have been a poor choice of running mate, especially in light of the shift in the election's dynamics upon the withdrawal of President Biden from the election and advent of Kamala Harris as the Democratic nominee.

After the October 2024 vice-presidential debate, A CBS News/YouGov poll of likely debate viewers found Vance's favorability rose from 40% to 49%, while Walz's increased from 52% to 60%. Both candidates' unfavorability ratings also declined, with Vance's dropping from 54% to 47% and Walz's falling from 41% to 35%.

== Vice presidency (2025–present) ==
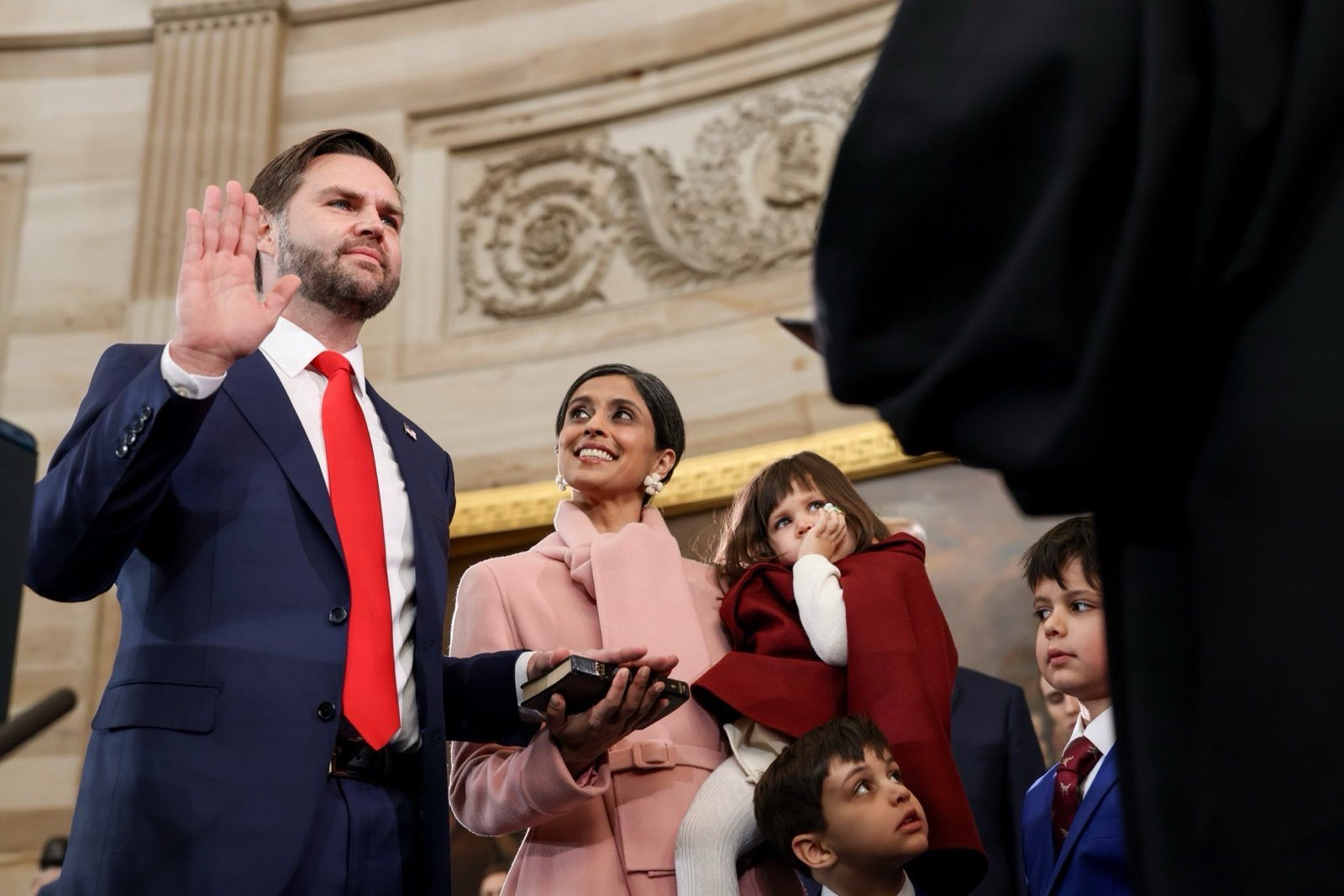
Vance being sworn in as vice president by Supreme Court Justice Brett Kavanaugh on January 20, 2025

At noon on January 20, 2025, Vance became the 50th vice president of the United States, sworn into the office by Justice Brett Kavanaugh. Before his inauguration, he held a meeting with China's vice president Han Zheng in which they discussed China–United States relations. Vance is also the first Marine Corps veteran to serve as vice president.

Among Vance's first acts as vice president was swearing in Secretary of State Marco Rubio, the first of Trump's cabinet nominees to be approved by the Senate, on January 21. On January 24, he cast the tie-breaking vote to confirm Pete Hegseth as Secretary of Defense. In February 2025, after multiple federal judges issued temporary rulings against various Trump administration actions, Vance wrote, "judges aren't allowed to control the executive's legitimate power".

On February 14, 2025, Vance delivered a speech at the 61st Munich Security Conference. In it, he criticized European Union leaders for actions such as annulling Romania's presidential election under claims of foreign interference and using "misinformation" laws to silence political opposition. Vance warned that the US would condition its support for Europe on whether its governments actually uphold free speech, press freedom, and political legitimacy, and criticized European governments for "running in fear of their own voters". His tone and content marked a sharp departure from past US foreign policy rhetoric and prompted strong backlash from European leaders. Several media outlets regarded the speech as a turning point in European Union–United States relations along with Trump's telephone conversation with Russian president Vladimir Putin. Some called it a declaration of "ideological war" and "culture war" against the United States' European allies, and a "wrecking ball" to the decades-long status quo of transatlantic relations.

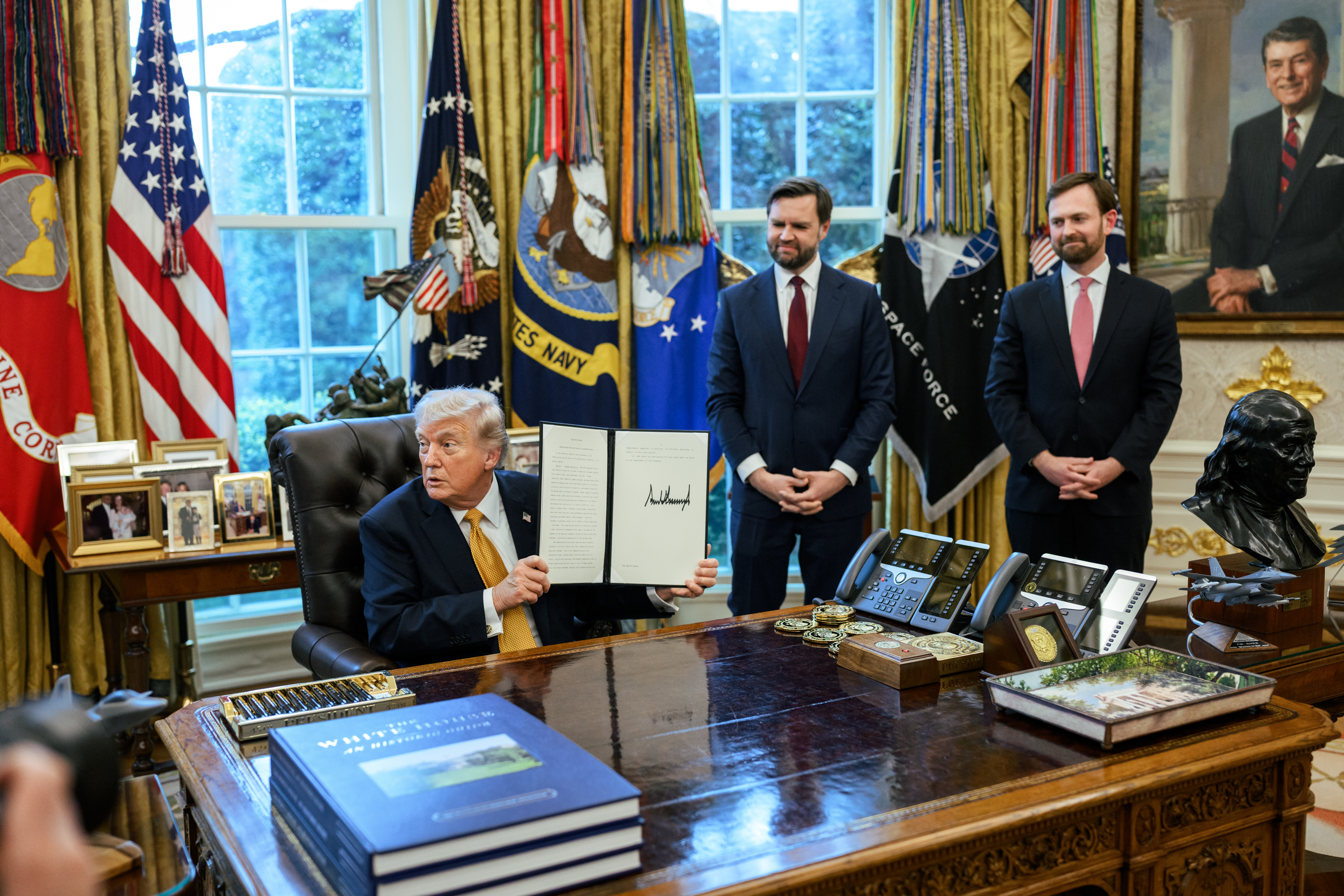
President Trump signing an executive order creating the White House Task Force to Eliminate Fraud with Vance as the chairman on March 16, 2026

In a first for a sitting U.S. vice president, in March 2025 Vance visited Greenland, where he said "We can't just ignore the president's desires" for the U.S. to acquire Greenland. He also warned that Greenland faced the "encroachment of powerful countries" China and Russia "as they expand their ambitions", while declaring in a "message to Denmark" that "you have not done a good job". Vance criticized Denmark for having "underinvested in the security architecture" and "people of Greenland". The next month, he lamented that the "globalist economy" had caused the U.S. to "borrow money from Chinese peasants to buy the things those Chinese peasants manufacture".

In May 2025, Vance and Rubio helped mediate a ceasefire deal between India and Pakistan amid the 2025 India–Pakistan conflict. In February 2026, Vance became the first sitting U.S. vice president to visit Armenia, where he met with Armenian Prime Minister Nikol Pashinyan to advance a U.S.-brokered multi-billion-dollar civil nuclear energy deal with the goal of decreasing Russia's influence in the region.

In March 2026, reports emerged of a policy divide between Trump and Vance over U.S.-Israeli military strikes against Iran. Vance publicly defended the administration's actions as necessary to eliminate Iran's nuclear threat, but reportedly expressed skepticism during internal White House deliberations before the military operation. Vance was the head of the U.S. delegation at the April 2026 negotiations with Iran in Islamabad. A former administration official told The Hill, "This is probably the toughest thing he'll do as vice president. [...] These are the toughest negotiators in the world." On April 12, after 21 hours of talks, Vance said the negotiations had ended without an agreement and reiterated that Iran "cannot have a nuclear weapon".

In August 2026, The New York Times reported that Vance had embraced the role of a pugilistic "attack dog" and "one of the administration's chief trolls" by replying to liberal and conservative commentators' criticism with profanity and personal insults. It described the embrace as departing from previous vice presidents' standards of decorum and restraint.

== Political positions ==
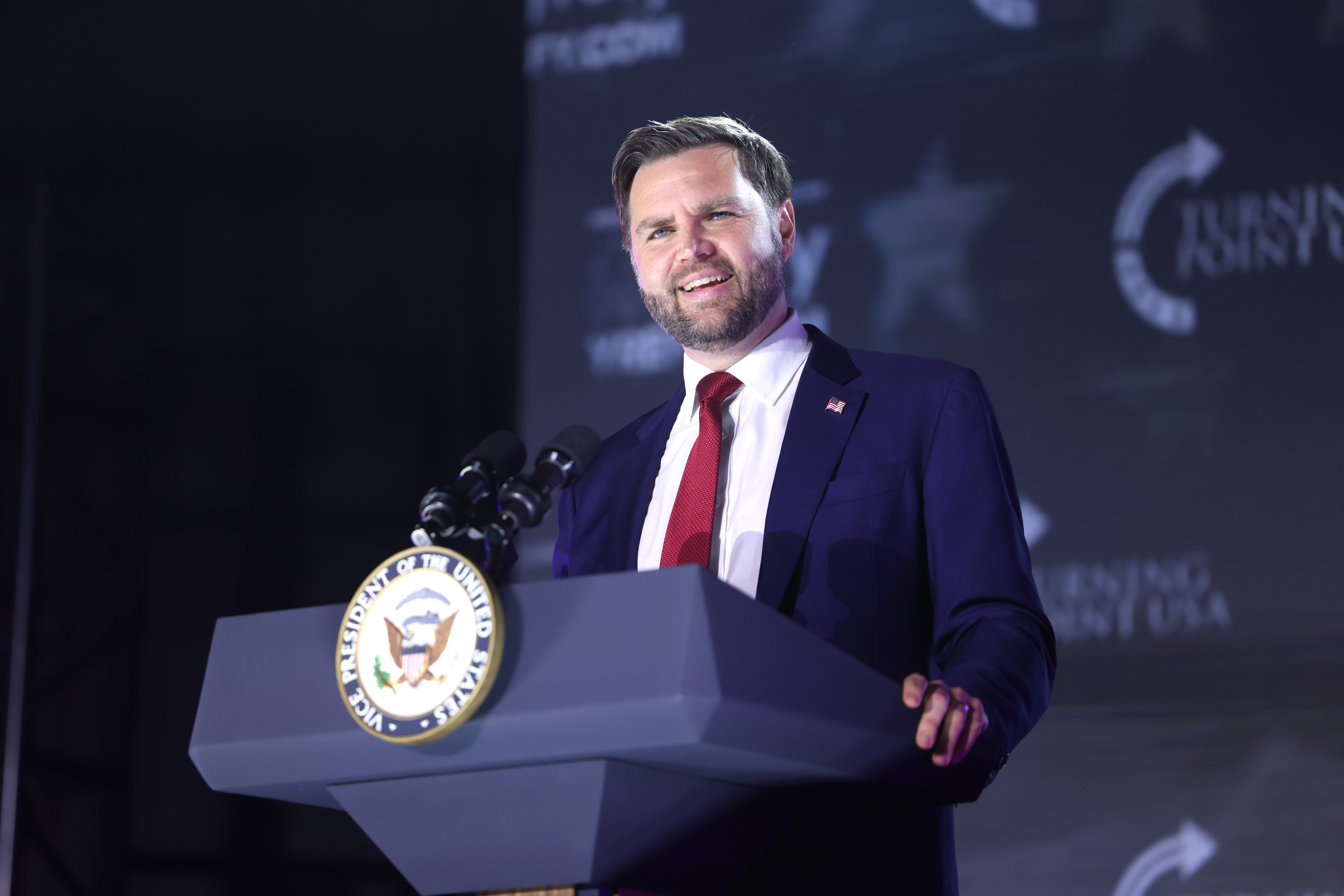
Vance speaking at a 2025 Turning Point USA event in Oxford, Mississippi. The organization's founder, activist Charlie Kirk, was assassinated one month earlier.

Vance has been called a national conservative, right-wing populist, and an ideological successor to paleoconservatives such as Pat Buchanan. Vance describes himself, and has been described by others, as a member of the postliberal right. He has said he was influenced by Catholic social teaching. He has endorsed books by Kevin Roberts, president of the Heritage Foundation, and far-right conspiracy theorist Jack Posobiec.

On social issues, Vance is considered conservative. He opposes abortion and gun control. As a senator, he voted against the Respect for Marriage Act, and while he accepts gay marriage as the law of the land, he opposes it as a Catholic. He has taken a number of natalist positions. He has repeatedly expressed a belief that childlessness is linked to sociopathy and said that parents should have more voting power than non-parents, but he backtracked from that suggestion in August 2024. He has proposed federal criminalization of gender-affirming care for minors. He supports Israel in the Gaza war. He opposes continued American military aid to Ukraine during the ongoing Russian invasion and prefers a negotiated peace. He has argued that the country's largest and most powerful institutions have united against the right. He has said there is a "need to seize the institutions of the left" and has called for "a de-woke-ification program" even if the courts say it is illegal. He is critical of universities, which he has called "the enemy". Vance is also critical of both the U.S. Department of Justice (DOJ) and the Federal Bureau of Investigation. In October 2025, Vance said a much lower rate of legal immigration would be better for the U.S.

In 2016, Vance was an outspoken critic of Republican presidential nominee Donald Trump, calling him "America's Hitler" and "reprehensible" and himself a "never Trump guy". In 2021, after he announced his Senate candidacy, Vance publicly announced support for Trump, apologizing for his past criticisms and deleting some of them. That year, Vance advised Trump to fire all civil servants and replace them with Trump supporters. Vance has said that if he had been vice president during the 2020 presidential election, he would not have certified the results. Instead, Vance said that some states Trump lost should have sent pro-Trump electors to Washington so that Congress could decide the election. Vance has dismissed the Watergate scandal and suggested that Richard Nixon was unfairly forced out in 1974, repeatedly comparing Nixon to Trump. Historians have responded that the Watergate tapes provide overwhelming evidence of Nixon's abuses.

Vance has cited the writers Patrick Deneen, Rod Dreher, Curtis Yarvin, and J. R. R. Tolkien as influences on his beliefs. Peter Thiel, William Julius Wilson, Robert Putnam, David Autor, René Girard, Raj Chetty, Oren Cass, and Yoram Hazony are also said to have shaped his thinking. Dreher was a guest at Vance's baptism.

=== Abortion and gun control ===
Vance opposes abortion, and supported the Supreme Court of the United States overturning of Roe v. Wade. In 2022, he said, "I certainly would like abortion to be illegal nationally." In 2024, he said that abortion laws should be set by the states. Vance has called the "right to life" a priority for conservatives.

Vance has taken a pro-Second Amendment position and said in 2022 that many gun control measures infringe on people's rights without making them safer. In 2024, during a campaign event held the day after a mass shooting at a high school in Georgia, Vance said that school shootings are "a fact of life" and that they would not be prevented by stricter gun laws, instead calling for more security in schools.

=== Immigration and ICE ===
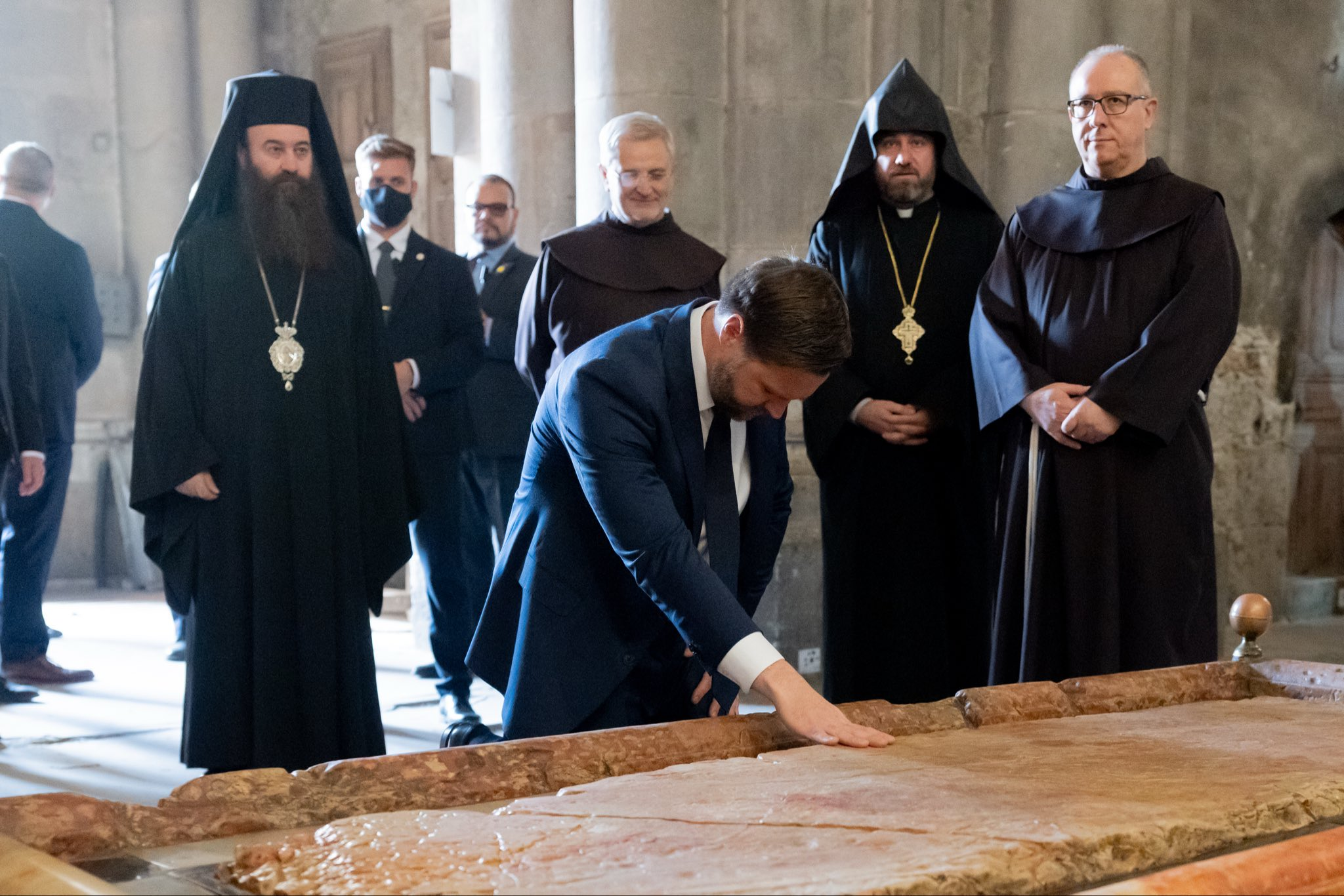
Vance visiting the Church of the Holy Sepulchre during a trip to Israel in October 2025

Vance has been a supporter of Trump's proposal for a wall along the southern border and proposed spending $3 billion to finish the wall. In 2024, he said "Haitian illegal immigrants" were causing chaos all over Springfield, Ohio, and that people's pets had been abducted and eaten by illegal immigrants. In October 2025, Vance called for a reduction in legal immigration to the United States.

Vance has strongly supported the aggressive immigration enforcement operations of Immigration and Customs Enforcement (ICE). In January 2026, he defended the ICE officer who killed Renée Good, a U.S. citizen in Minneapolis, calling Good a left-wing agitator who had tried to hit the officer with her car. Vance said the officer who shot Good was protected by absolute immunity, drawing criticism from legal experts, and expressed gratitude to the officer. Vance publicly argued that uncooperative local officials were to blame for chaos in Minneapolis, and privately urged the administration to invoke the Insurrection Act of 1807 to deploy military force against protesters.

=== Foreign policy ===
Vance has been called an isolationist and a realist. He considers China a serious national security threat, a view broadly aligned with Republican national security professional Elbridge Colby. At the 2024 Munich Security Conference, Vance said the U.S. did not want to withdraw from the North Atlantic Treaty Organization (NATO), but argued the U.S. should shift its focus to East Asia, and that certain European and NATO member countries were not spending enough for their own security. During the 2026 Iran war, Vance criticized conservative hawks in the US, saying they want to topple the Iranian regime, despite the fact that the US history of doing so is not encouraging and it would involve a significant commitment of ground troops.

== Personal life ==
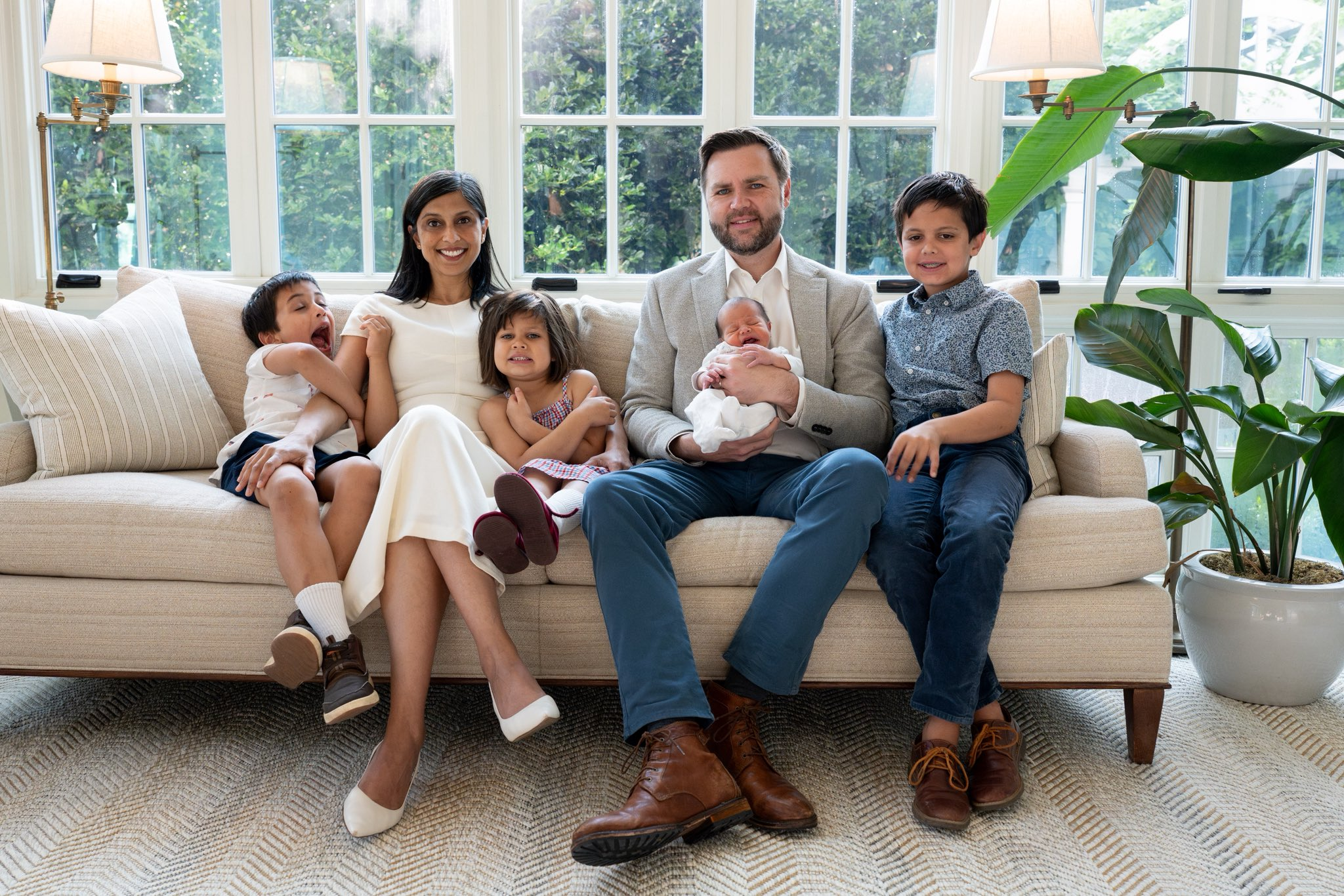
Vance with his wife Usha and their four children in July 2026

Vance wrote in his memoir, Hillbilly Elegy, that he was raised in a low-income family by his single mother and grandmother. In 2013, Vance met Usha Chilukuri while both were students at Yale Law School. In June 2014, they married in Kentucky in an interfaith marriage ceremony; she is Hindu and he was a Protestant Christian. In 2019, he converted to Roman Catholicism. The wedding included a Bible reading by Vance's "best friend", Jamil Jivani, and the bride and groom were blessed by a Hindu pandit. Usha clerked for a year for Brett Kavanaugh, at the time an appeals court judge in Washington, then clerked for Chief Justice John Roberts for a year.

JD and Usha Vance have four children. With the birth of the couple's fourth child on July 19, 2026, Vance became the first vice president to have a child while in office since Schuyler Colfax in 1870. In an excerpt from his book Communion published in June 2026 as an op-ed by The Wall Street Journal, Vance wrote that the 2025 assassination of Charlie Kirk influenced Usha's decision to have a fourth child. The couple own over 100 acres of land in Kentucky. In 2018, Vance bought a 157-year-old home for $1.4 million in East Walnut Hills, Cincinnati.

Vance was raised in a "conservative, evangelical" branch of Protestantism. When entering college, he was an atheist. By September 2016, he was "not an active participant" in any particular Christian denomination but was "thinking very seriously about converting to Catholicism". In August 2019, Vance was baptized and confirmed in the Catholic Church. He chose Augustine of Hippo as his confirmation saint. Vance said he converted because he "became persuaded over time that Catholicism was true [...] and Augustine gave me a way to understand Christian faith in a strongly intellectual way", adding that Catholic theology aligned with his political views and key people in his life are Catholic. Peter Thiel influenced him to convert to Catholicism. Vance has been criticized by both Pope Francis and his successor, Pope Leo XIV, for his views on immigration and responded by invoking the traditional concept of ordo amoris in Catholic theology, which he interprets as loving his own nationals more than foreigners and equates with the slogan "America First". Cardinal Timothy Dolan has called Vance "a very good guy" while expressing disagreement with him on immigration and foreign policy.

Vance's cousin Nate Vance, a U.S. Marine Corps veteran, volunteered to fight for Ukraine in 2022 after Russia's invasion. Nate served in the "Da Vinci Wolves" unit, fighting in major battles like Kupiansk and Bakhmut. In 2025, he criticized JD's stance on Ukraine, accusing him and Trump of aiding Russia. He expressed disappointment that JD, despite their family connection, did not consult him for insights on the war. Vance's half-brother Cory Bowman unsuccessfully ran for office in the 2025 Cincinnati mayoral election.

== Electoral history ==
=== 2022 United States Senate race in Ohio ===
2022 United States Senate Republican primary results in Ohio
Party	Candidate	Votes	%
Republican	JD Vance	344,736	32.22%
Republican	Josh Mandel	255,854	23.92%
Republican	Matt Dolan	249,239	23.30%
Republican	Mike Gibbons	124,653	11.65%
Republican	Jane Timken	62,779	5.87%
Republican	Mark Pukita	22,692	2.12%
Republican	Neil Patel	9,873	0.92%
Total votes		1,069,826	100.0%

2022 United States Senate election in Ohio
Party	Candidate	Votes	%	±%
Republican	JD Vance	2,192,114	53.04%	N/A
Democratic	Tim Ryan	1,939,489	46.92%	N/A
Write-in		1,739	0.04%	N/A
Total votes		4,133,342	100.0%	N/A
Republican hold				

=== 2024 United States presidential election ===
==== Nomination ====
2024 Republican National Convention, vice presidential tally
Candidate	Votes	%
JD Vance	– (Note: Chosen by acclamation)	100.00
Total votes		100.00

==== General election ====
Electoral college map of the 2024 election

Electoral results
Presidential candidate	Party	Home state	Popular vote		Electoral vote	Running mate		
Presidential candidate	Party	Home state	Count	Percentage	Electoral vote	Vice-presidential candidate	Home state	Electoral vote
Donald Trump	Republican	Florida	77,236,275	49.9%	312	JD Vance	Ohio	312
Kamala Harris	Democratic	California	74,938,474	48.4%	226	Tim Walz	Minnesota	226
Jill Stein	Green	Massachusetts	782,068	0.5%	0	Butch Ware	California	0
Robert F. Kennedy Jr.	Independent	New York	755,018	0.5%	0	Nicole Shanahan	California	0
Other					—	Other		—
Total				100%	538			538
Needed to win					270			270

== Awards and decorations ==
Vance's awards and decorations include:

Navy and Marine Corps Achievement Medal	Marine Corps Good Conduct Medal	National Defense Service Medal
Iraq Campaign Medal	Global War on Terrorism Service Medal	Navy and Marine Corps Sea Service Deployment Ribbon

== Written works ==
- Vance, J. D. (June 16, 2026). Communion: Finding My Way Back to Faith. HarperCollins Publishers. ISBN 978-0-06-357501-1.
- Vance, J. D. (November 12, 2024). Foreword. Dawn's Early Light: Taking Back Washington to Save America. By Roberts, Kevin. Broadside Books. ISBN 978-0-06-335350-3.
- Vance, J. D. (July 9, 2024). "Blurb". Unhumans. By Posobiec, Jack; Lisec, Joshua. War Room Books. ISBN 978-1-64821-085-3.
- Vance, J. D. (June 28, 2016). Hillbilly Elegy: A Memoir of a Family and Culture in Crisis. HarperCollins Publishers. ISBN 978-0-06-230054-6.

== See also ==
- List of vice presidents of the United States
- Urban Appalachians

== Notes ==
Party political offices
Preceded by Rob Portman	Republican nominee for United States Senator from Ohio (Class 3); 2022	Succeeded by Jon Husted
Preceded by Mike Pence	Republican nominee for Vice President of the United States; 2024	Most recent
U.S. Senate
Preceded by Rob Portman	United States Senator (Class 3) from Ohio; 2023–2025; Served alongside: Sherrod Brown, Bernie Moreno	Succeeded by Jon Husted
Political offices
Preceded by Kamala Harris	Vice President of the United States; 2025–present	Incumbent
U.S. order of precedence (ceremonial)
Preceded by Donald Trump as President	Order of precedence of the United States as Vice President	Followed by Relevant state governor
U.S. presidential line of succession
First	1st as Vice President	Succeeded by Mike Johnson as Speaker of the U.S. House of Representatives
