= Jim O'Neill (investor) =

American science and technology investor

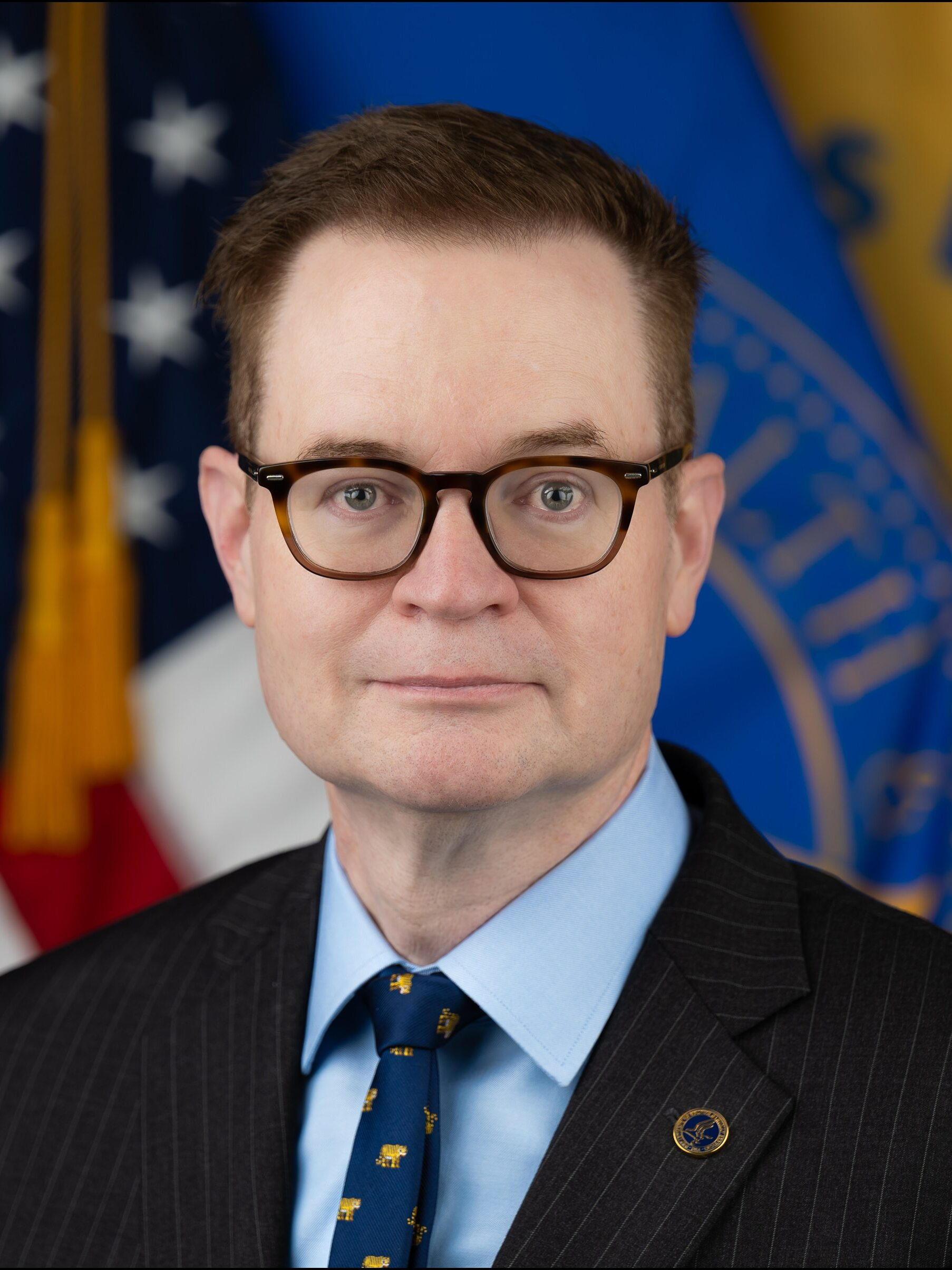
- Official portrait, 2025

25th United States Deputy Secretary of Health and Human Services
- In office June 9, 2025 – February 13, 2026
- President: Donald Trump
- Secretary: Robert F. Kennedy Jr.
- Preceded by: Andrea Palm
- Succeeded by: Vacant

Acting Director of the Centers for Disease Control and Prevention
- In office August 28, 2025 – February 13, 2026
- President: Donald Trump
- Preceded by: Susan Monarez
- Succeeded by: Jay Bhattacharya (acting)

Personal details
- Born: James O'Neill
- Party: Republican
- Children: 3
- Education: Yale University (BA); University of Chicago (MA)

James O'Neill is an American science and technology investor who was U.S. Deputy Secretary of Health and Human Services from June 2025 to February 2026, and concurrently acting Director of the Centers for Disease Control and Prevention from August 2025 to February 2026.

O'Neill served in several roles at the U.S. Department of Health and Human Services during the Bush administration during 2002–2008, the most senior of which was Principal Associate Deputy Secretary. He subsequently was a managing director at Clarium Capital and then at Mithril Capital. He then was CEO of SENS Research Foundation, a medical research organization focused on rejuvenation. He has been a frequent critic of the U.S. Food and Drug Administration.

In 2025, President-elect Donald Trump nominated O'Neill to serve as U.S. Deputy Secretary of Health and Human Services. He was confirmed along party lines by a 52–43 vote, and assumed office on June 9, 2025. Later that year, O'Neill was concurrently appointed as acting director of the Centers for Disease Control and Prevention. He left his HHS positions on February 13, 2026, and was then nominated to be the director of the National Science Foundation on March 2, 2026.

== Early life and education ==
O'Neill attended Yale University from 1986 to 1990, receiving a bachelor's degree in humanities. In 1989–90, he was General Manager of the Yale Precision Marching Band (YPMB). He studied at the University of Chicago from 1996 to 1997, earning an master's degree in humanities.

== Career ==
Early in his career, O'Neill worked for Texas Senator Kay Bailey Hutchison, and in the White House.

=== George W. Bush administration (2001–2009) ===
O'Neill worked at the U.S. Department of Education during 2001–2002.

From December 2002 to August 2005, O’Neill served as Director of the Speech and Editorial Division of the U.S. Department of Health and Human Services (HHS), where he wrote or edited all speeches given by the HHS Secretary. He was also a member of the United States Delegation to the World Health Assembly.

He was Associate Deputy Secretary and Senior Advisor to the Deputy Secretary of HHS from August 2005 to November 2007, where he was involved in policy formulation for various HHS components.

He then served as Principal Associate Deputy Secretary of HHS from November 2007 to October 2008, where he provided advice on policy and programming, helped manage HHS, and his policy portfolio focused on FDA, NIH, AHRQ, the Office of Public Health and Science, BARDA, global health, and the President's Management Agenda. In addition, he served on the President's Management Council and the Task Force on New Americans.

=== Private career (2008–2025) ===
After working at HHS, O'Neill was managing director of Clarium Capital, a hedge fund led by Peter Thiel, during 2008–2012. During this time he was also CEO of the Thiel Foundation from 2009 to 2012 and was managing director from 2008 to 2012 at Thiel Capital. O'Neill is a co-founder of the Thiel Fellowship, founded in 2010, which gives 24 students a year $100,000 to drop out of school and pursue entrepreneurial interests, and Breakout Labs, a venture capital firm affiliated with the Thiel Foundation founded in 2011, which provides funding to food science and biotech firms.

From 2012 to 2019, he was managing director of Mithril Capital Management, a venture capital fund co-founded by Peter Thiel that funds businesses like Palantir Technologies and Helion Energy.

In May 2023, O'Neill filed a lawsuit in the San Francisco Superior Court (case CGC-23-606566) against Mithril Capital Management LLC, related entities, and managing partner Ajay Royan. He alleged breach of contract, breach of the covenant of good faith and fair dealing, and unfair competition, claiming he was wrongfully terminated for cause in March 2019 without good cause and was thereby deprived of vested carried-interest points. Mithril later filed a cross-complaint alleging data theft and related misconduct.

He was also a board member of the Seasteading Institute, until shortly before 2017. O'Neill was considered a candidate for FDA Commissioner and was reportedly favored by Donald Trump's transition team in 2016, but was not nominated for that position.

He was appointed CEO of the SENS Research Foundation in October 2019, having previously been a board member during 2010–2011. He remained in that position until July 2021. In March 2023, he joined the board of ADvantage Therapeutics Inc.

=== Second Trump administration (2025–2026) ===
In November 2024, President-elect Trump said he intended to nominate O'Neill to serve as Deputy Secretary of Health and Human Services under Robert F. Kennedy Jr., both of whom would need confirmation by the U.S. Senate. He was confirmed on June 5, 2025, in a 52–43 vote, and assumed office on June 9.

On August 28, 2025, O'Neill was concurrently appointed as acting director of the Centers for Disease Control and Prevention after the ousting of Susan Monarez.

On February 13, 2026, O'Neill left his HHS positions. He was nominated to be Director of the National Science Foundation on March 2; on November 18, Bill Cassidy, chair of the Senate Health, Education, Labor and Pensions Committee, announced that the nomination would not be considered because O'Neill had not stood up to Kennedy for what were deemed by Cassidy to be irresponsible decisions and statements.

== Views ==
He is a libertarian and an advocate of anti-aging medicine.

In a 2009 talk, he called for freer markets for a wide range of health-care goods and services. "Basically, because there’s not a free market in health care, people are suffering very significant health consequences that in a free market they would not suffer," he said, asserting that a free market in health care "would drive prices much lower and allow innovation in cheaper delivery of care, both in terms of drugs and devices and better forms of delivery."

While at HHS during the George W. Bush administration, O'Neill opposed FDA regulation of some companies that use mathematical algorithms to perform complex laboratory-developed tests. "In order to regulate in this space, FDA had to argue that an algorithm, a series of numbers that match up to things, is a medical device," he said. "I found that really astonishing – astonishing that someone could say it with a straight face, and astonishing that someone could claim the ability to shut down companies that were never touching a patient but only accurately matching algorithms."

O'Neill said in a 2014 speech, "We should reform FDA so there is approving drugs after their sponsors have demonstrated safety – and let people start using them, at their own risk, but not much risk of safety....Let’s prove efficacy after they’ve been legalized."

Political offices
Preceded by Andrea Palm	United States Deputy Secretary of Health and Human Services; 2025–2026	Vacant
Preceded by Susan Monarez	Director of the Centers for Disease Control and Prevention; Acting; 2025–2026	Succeeded by Jay Bhattacharya; Acting
