= Joe Crawford (basketball) =

American basketball player (born 1986)

Personal information
- Born: June 17, 1986 (age 40) Detroit, Michigan, U.S.
- Listed height: 6 ft 5 in (1.96 m)
- Listed weight: 215 lb (98 kg)

Career information
- High school: Renaissance (Detroit, Michigan)
- College: Kentucky (2004–2008)
- NBA draft: 2008: 2nd round, 58th overall pick
- Drafted by: Los Angeles Lakers
- Playing career: 2008–2015
- Position: Shooting guard / small forward
- Number: 5

Career history
- 2008–2010: Los Angeles D-Fenders
- 2009: New York Knicks
- 2010: Jiangsu Dragons
- 2010–2011: Beijing Ducks
- 2011–2012: Maccabi Rishon LeZion
- 2015: Erie BayHawks

Career highlights
- Second-team All-SEC (2008); Second-team Parade All-American (2004); McDonald's All-American (2004)
- Stats at NBA.com
- Stats at Basketball Reference

Joseph Reshard Crawford II (born June 17, 1986) is an American former professional basketball player. He played college basketball for the Kentucky Wildcats and was selected with the 58th overall pick by the Los Angeles Lakers in the 2008 NBA draft. He signed with the Lakers on August 27, 2008, but was waived October 22, during the 2008–09 pre-season.

== High school and recruitment ==
Crawford attended Renaissance High School in Detroit, where he led his team to a perfect 27–0 record and a state title. He was named a McDonald's All-American in 2004. Crawford originally committed to play for the University of Michigan, but reopened his recruitment and chose to attend the University of Kentucky as part of a freshman class that also featured Ramel Bradley and All-Americans Rajon Rondo and Randolph Morris.

== College career ==
Crawford became a bigger part of the team's rotation in his sophomore season, averaging 10.2 points and 3.9 rebounds per game.

During his junior year, Crawford started 32 of 34 games and averaged 14 points, 4 rebounds, and 2.4 assists per game. He was the leading scorer in 8 games and set a new career high in an overtime loss against the Georgia Bulldogs with 29 points.

Crawford became the 54th Wildcat to score 1,000 points in his career on December 1, 2007, against the North Carolina Tarheels.

On March 20, 2008, Crawford closed his career with a loss to Marquette Golden Eagles in the first round of the NCAA tournament. Crawford was the game's high scorer, matching a career-best with 35 points before fouling out.

== Professional career ==
Joe Crawford was drafted by the Los Angeles Lakers with the 58th overall pick in the second round of the 2008 NBA draft. He signed with the Lakers on August 27, 2008. Crawford was waived by the Lakers on October 22, 2008. Crawford had played in all three exhibition games during the NBA pre-season, averaging 8.3 minutes and 2.7 points. Crawford had to make the team in order for his contract to be guaranteed. Crawford then played in the NBA Development League for the Los Angeles Lakers affiliate Los Angeles D-Fenders. On March 26, 2009, Crawford was called up from the D-League by the New York Knicks and signed a 10-day contract. On April 6, 2009, he signed with the Knicks for the rest of the season. On October 22, 2009, Joe Crawford was waived from the Knicks' roster.

After playing for the Orlando Magic's summer league team in the summer of 2010, Crawford signed a non-guaranteed contract with the Sacramento Kings. He was released on October 15. Joe Crawford then joined his former University of Kentucky teammate Randolph Morris on the Beijing Ducks. He later played with Maccabi Rishon LeZion of Israel.

On January 18, 2015, he was acquired by the Erie BayHawks of the NBA Development League. On October 12, he left Erie to sign in the newly formed AmeriLeague; however, the league folded after it was discovered the founder was a con-artist.

== Career statistics ==
Legend
GP	Games played	GS	Games started	MPG	Minutes per game
FG%	Field goal percentage	3P%	3-point field goal percentage	FT%	Free throw percentage
RPG	Rebounds per game	APG	Assists per game	SPG	Steals per game
BPG	Blocks per game	PPG	Points per game	**Bold**	Career high

=== NBA ===
==== Regular season ====
Year	Team	GP	GS	MPG	FG%	3P%	FT%	RPG	APG	SPG	BPG	PPG
2008–09	New York	2	0	11.5	.300	.250	1.000	2.0	0.5	0.5	0.0	4.5

== Personal life ==
Crawford's brother, Jordan Crawford, played college basketball for Indiana and Xavier; he also played six seasons in the National Basketball Association.
