= List of The Wonder Years characters =

This is a list of characters of the television series The Wonder Years.

== Main characters ==
=== Kevin Arnold ===
Kevin Arnold (Fred Savage) is the main character. Born on March 18, 1956, Kevin grew up in the turbulent late 1960s and early 1970s. Right after he graduated from high school in 1974, he went off to college, got married and has a son born in 1981. The voice of the present-day adult Kevin (the show's voice-over narrator) is supplied by Daniel Stern.

=== Jack Arnold ===
John "Jack" Arnold (Dan Lauria) is Kevin's father; a gruff, laconic man and a Korean War veteran; he grew up during the Great Depression, served in the US Marine Corps right after he graduated from college, and is seen in photographs wearing the uniform of a First Lieutenant. He works as a product distribution manager at NORCOM, a large military defense company. Later, he starts his own business, building and selling handcrafted furniture. He was born on November 5, 1927, and the series finale reveals that he dies in 1975 near the end of Kevin's freshman year of college - two years after the time of the show's finale.

=== Norma Arnold ===
Norma Arnold (née Gustafson) (Alley Mills) is Kevin's homemaker mother who was born on March 22, 1930. Unlike her husband, Norma is friendly, upbeat, and optimistic. She met Jack as a college freshman. When he graduated, she moved across the country with him and did not finish college. She eventually gets her degree late in the series and begins work at a software startup called Micro Electronics. She worked her way up in the future as board chairwoman at the end of the series.

=== Karen Arnold ===
Karen Arnold (Olivia d'Abo) is Kevin's older, rebellious, hippie sister who was born in 1952. Her free-spirited lifestyle clashes with her overbearing father's conservatism, and she depends upon her mother as a mediator. When Karen moves in with her boyfriend Michael (David Schwimmer) during her freshman year of college, she has a falling-out with her father. The pair marry one year later and move to Alaska, where Michael has secured a good job working on the Alaska Pipeline. Karen ultimately accepts some of her parents' viewpoints and has a baby, while her husband learns to support his wife and child.

=== Wayne Arnold ===
Wayne Arnold (Jason Hervey) is Kevin's older brother who was born in 1954. Wayne enjoys physically tormenting Kevin and Paul, calling Kevin "butthead" or "scrote". Wayne is usually portrayed as a loser in romantic relationships. For a time he dated a girl named Dolores, which was more casual than serious. In later seasons, Wayne matures. In the final season, he begins a serious relationship with a divorcee named Bonnie but is left heartbroken when she reconciles with her ex-husband. In the series finale, it is revealed that he takes over the family furniture business after Jack dies in 1975.

=== Paul Pfeiffer ===
Paul Joshua Pfeiffer (Josh Saviano): is Kevin's long time best friend, a bright and excellent student and allergy sufferer. He is also Jewish and in one episode celebrates his bar mitzvah. Although Kevin and Paul are best friends in the series's early seasons, their relationship becomes somewhat strained later. Kevin begins to spend more time with Chuck and Jeff, causing tension with Paul. Paul also attends a private prep school for one season, leaving Kevin alone to start public high school. In another episode Kevin tattles on Paul after Paul loses his virginity. In the final episode it is revealed that Paul eventually attends Harvard and studied law and become a lawyer. He was born on March 14, 1956.

=== Winnie Cooper ===
Gwendolyn "Winnie" Cooper (Danica McKellar) is Kevin's main love interest and neighbor for the first three seasons (she and her family move across town at the end of Season 3). Their first kiss, and her older brother's death in Vietnam, play an important part in the pilot. In another episode, Winnie's parents separate in grief over the death of their son. In the epilogue of the final episode, it is revealed that Winnie travels overseas to study art history in Paris. Kevin and Winnie write to each other every week for these eight years until she returns; in the concluding moments of the finale, Kevin says that when Winnie returned to the States, Kevin met her accompanied by his wife and first child—despite the hope among Wonder Years fans that Kevin and Winnie would themselves marry, as they seemed destined to do so throughout the series's run. "Like I said," says Kevin at the end, "things never turn out exactly the way you plan them." As suggested in an episode entitled "The Accident" and in the final episode of the series, every important event in Kevin's life has somehow involved Winnie. She was born in either September or October.

== Recurring characters ==
=== Introduced in Season 1 ===
- Brian Cooper (Bentley Mitchum): Winnie Cooper's older brother. He was seen in the opening scene of the pilot episode working on an El Camino car when Wayne and Kevin are fighting, ordering Wayne to cut it out, to which Wayne agrees as (in the words of Kevin) Brian "defined cool" for all the kids on the block, being the eldest of the neighborhood kids at 19. He was then conscripted into the US Army. When Kevin is disciplined by Mr. DiPerna for throwing food in the cafeteria at school, Mr. & Mrs. Arnold are called in. However Jack and Norma's attention turns to a more serious matter, as they are told Brian was killed in Vietnam, and go to comfort Mr. & Mrs. Cooper. Kevin is later seen with his family and the Coopers attending Brian's funeral, which Kevin recalls was the first funeral he attended which was "not for an old person". Brian's ghost then appears to Kevin at the wake, saying that he is fine with Kevin's growing relationship with Winnie; only for Kevin to give Winnie some space so she can help get over his loss.
- Ed Cutlip (Robert Picardo): Kevin's insecure gym teacher, who excels in bullying his students and always wears a red cap to hide his bald head, which has a steel plate in it. He enjoys drawing diagrams on the board that nobody can decipher, and Kevin describes him as having an inferiority complex. However, he is shown to be somewhat of a more sensitive person than usually indicated when he plays a department store Santa in a Christmas-related episode, where Kevin is the only student to know of Coach Cutlip's part-time job. Coach Cutlip is also aware of his mean personality towards the students, and admits to Kevin, "kids like me when I am Santa".
- Mr. Diperna (Raye Birk): the strict, by-the-book vice principal of Robert F. Kennedy Junior High and Kevin's nemesis. In the pilot episode, Kevin gets in trouble and is disciplined by Mr. Diperna. Mostly in the series, he usually gives Kevin and the students a hard time. He later fires Kevin's mom shortly after she is hired by the school as a receptionist. A more sympathetic portrayal of Mr. Diperna was shown in "Goodbye", where he privately confers with Kevin that Mr. Collins died and that he will replace him as Kevin's math teacher until they find a suitable hire.
- Miss White/Mrs. Heimer (Wendel Meldrum): Kevin's junior high English teacher. Kevin harbors a crush on her and sometimes imagines that she feels the same way. She gets married after the second season and becomes Mrs. Heimer, but Kevin continues calling her Miss White, which she always corrects. In one episode, a pregnant Mrs. Heimer needs Kevin to drive her to the hospital on the day of his junior high graduation as she's going into labor and can't find her husband.
- Lisa Berlini (Kathy Wagner): Kevin's junior high school classmate on whom he develops a strong crush. After Kevin works up the courage to call her on the phone to break the ice, a steady relationship between the two seems promising — until Lisa unceremoniously breaks a date with him to the Fall Dance to go to the same dance with another guy, revealing to Kevin that she only likes him as a friend.
- Carla Healey (Krista Murphy): Kevin's junior high school classmate and one-time girlfriend of Paul.
- Kirk McCray (Michael Landes): A popular 8th grader whom Winnie starts dating in 1968. She ultimately breaks up with him early the next year.

=== Introduced in Season 2 ===
- Rebecca "Becky" Slater (Crystal McKellar): Kevin's junior high school classmate and one-time girlfriend. He dates her purely to make Winnie jealous and she punches him when she finds out he still likes Winnie. Because of that, she holds a grudge against Kevin and becomes a recurring, physically violent aggressive nuisance throughout Kevin's junior high school years.
- Randy Mitchell (Michael Tricario) is Kevin's friend, described as loyal and brave, though noticeably lacking Paul's intelligence. (He gets a 730 combined score on his SAT.) Though he appeared throughout the entire series, he usually had only minor parts in episodes. Randy and Paul are the only characters to remain on throughout the series as Kevin's friends in both junior high and high school.
- Mr. Cantwell (Ben Stein): Kevin's junior high school science teacher. He often shows filmstrips to the class while speaking in a monotone voice.
- Doug Porter (Brandon Crane): Kevin's junior high school classmate and friend. He also becomes part of Kevin's entourage. In one episode, he briefly replaces Paul as Kevin's best friend after the two have a falling-out. Doug is very agreeable and loves to eat junk food. In later episodes Doug befriends both Kevin and Paul where they engage in activities such as touch football or sneaking to a sleepover attended by older teenage girls.
- Debbie Pfeiffer (Torrey Ann Cook): Paul Pfeiffer's little sister who has a crush on Kevin. Kevin takes Debbie to a cotillion dance in one episode, as Paul went to the football game.

=== Introduced in Season 3 ===
- Arthur Collins (Steven Gilborn): Kevin's math teacher in junior high. Despite his difficulty, and some misunderstandings between them, Kevin grows to have a respect for him and more than once regards him as a hero-figure. He dies of a heart condition in 1970.
- Craig Hobson (Sean Baca): Kevin's junior high school classmate. He often teases Kevin and Paul over their emotional hang-ups resulting from girlfriend problems, only to accidentally start a relationship himself by falling for Becky Slater when she hits him with her bicycle (her intended victim was Kevin). Craig's relationship with Becky stops her from harassing Kevin and allows the couples to happily co-exist. However, Hobson ends the relationship with Becky when his family enrolls him in a military academy for his ninth grade year, reviving her hatred of men and blaming Kevin.
- Albert Arnold (David Huddleston): Kevin's paternal grandfather, a loving but stubborn old man who constantly annoys his son, Jack. Though their relationship is strained, Kevin's father and grandfather have a strong bond that has a lasting effect on Kevin as he grows older. Grandpa gifted Kevin with a beagle dog, which Kevin named Buster, and sold Kevin his very first car—for one dollar. He also appeared in one episode being less jovial, when he announces the death of a family member named Rose and escorts the entire family to her funeral. Grandpa is also a widower, as Kevin's paternal grandmother was only seen in flashback scenes of family films.
  - Buster: Kevin's dog, a loving and loyal brown and white beagle. Buster was a gift given to Kevin by his grandfather Albert, much to Jack's disapproval. Eventually the family all fall in love with the dog, especially when it is feared that he is lost after running away in the park. Though physically appearing in only four episodes throughout the entire series, Kevin reminisces that Buster would always be there happily waiting for him throughout the most important events in his young life, including his graduations from high school and college.

=== Introduced in Season 4 ===
- Mr. Nestor (Charles Tyner): Kevin's hard-of-hearing elderly shop teacher.
- Tommy Kisling (Jay Lambert): Kevin's junior high school classmate and friend who finds a copy of Becky Slater's election speech and tempts Kevin to use it.
- Madeline Adams (Julie Condra): Kevin's junior high classmate whom he develops a crush on after Winnie attends another school after moving. Romantic tension develops between the two, and after Kevin and Winnie break up, he starts dating Madeline. It's short lived, however, as Kevin still has feelings for Winnie and dumps Madeline after she badmouths her.
- Michael (David Schwimmer): Karen's live-in boyfriend, and eventually, her husband. Kevin looks up to him as a role model and friend. Though a hippie like Karen, he's less opinionated, more level-headed and seemingly more mature than Karen. He and Karen move into the same place together before marriage, which upsets Jack greatly. Michael eventually wins Jack's approval and respect when he takes a job in Alaska, proving himself to be a hard worker who puts family first.

=== Introduced in Season 5 ===
- Wart (Scott Menville): Wayne's best friend. Wart early in the series is much like Wayne: immature and dimwitted. He later joins the Army and is shipped off to Vietnam. He returns much more mature and serious. He receives accolades and respect from people like Wayne, Kevin and Jack, but also receives threats and verbal abuse from other people. Wart is hinted at suffering from PTSD after his time in Vietnam, in particular Kevin notices him shirtless and crying by himself during a football game.
- Cara (Lisa Paige Robinson): Kevin's girlfriend during his summer vacation at the lake. Unlike other girls he has dated, Cara is a bit rebellious (smokes cigarettes, etc.). She and Kevin keep in touch by writing letters to each other after he leaves. On a spur-of-the-moment decision, Kevin ditches a workday to visit Cara the following summer, but is disappointed when he finds out she has another boyfriend.
- Chuck Coleman (Andy Berman): One of Kevin's high school friends, who often appears with a "nervous tic". Chuck dates Alice Pedermeir and, on one episode, confides that he may have gotten her pregnant. However, much to his relief, the pregnancy test turns out negative. On another episode, Chuck punches Kevin in the face after he catches Kevin in a compromising position with Alice, who was helping Kevin to get a good deal on a used car. But they patch things up.
- Ricky Halsenbach (Scott Nemes): Kevin's classmate and friend. He also becomes a member of Kevin's entourage. He was Kevin's first friend to get a driver's license. He fell in love with a new student named Haley but broke it off with her after Kevin and Jeff made fun of the size of her nose.
- Alice Pedermeir (Lindsay Sloane): One of Kevin and Winnie's high school friends, and Chuck's girlfriend. In the episode "Alice in Autoland", after breaking up with Chuck, she tells Kevin that she has had a crush on him forever, but then she comes back with her boyfriend. Everybody says she has an annoying voice.

=== Introduced in Season 6 ===
- Jeff Billings (Giovanni Ribisi): Kevin's good friend. His parents are divorced and he lives with his mother, which is the reason that he moves in late. He has a girlfriend from his old town but breaks it off with her midway through the final season.
- Bonnie Douglas (Paula Marshall): A 23-year-old divorcee with a six-month-old son whom Wayne meets at NORCOM and starts a relationship with. However, she eventually realizes she still has feelings for her ex-husband and breaks up with Wayne to reconcile with her ex.
