= AppHarvest =

American food production company

AppHarvest, Inc.
- Company type: Public
- Traded as: OTC Pink Limited: APPHQ; Nasdaq: APPH (2020–2023)
- Industry: Vertical farming; Hydroponics
- Founded: 2017; 9 years ago
- Headquarters: Morehead, Kentucky
- Key people: Jonathan Webb (CEO); Martha Stewart; Jeffrey Ubben; JD Vance
- Website: appharvest.com

AppHarvest, Inc. is an American hydroponics and vertical farming company in Appalachia.

== History ==
AppHarvest was founded by Jonathan Webb in 2017 and has board members including Martha Stewart, Jeffrey Ubben and JD Vance.

The company became publicly listed via a merger with special-purpose acquisition company (SPAC) Novus Capital Corp in 2020. On July 24, 2023, AppHarvest filed for Chapter 11 bankruptcy. As part of the bankruptcy proceedings, AppHarvest's greenhouses were sold off. Its Morehead and Richmond facilities were sold to Equilibrium Capital, a long-time investor in the company, while its Somerset facility was sold to Bosch Growers and its Berea facility was sold to Mastronardi.

AppHarvest, Inc. was covered in a Grist investigative report and was found to host an unsafe work environment where workers faced extreme heat inside the greenhouses, with temperatures sometimes reaching 155 degrees Fahrenheit, causing health issues. Contract workers outnumbered local employees and had fewer benefits, contrary to the company's original pledge to help the local economy. Multiple safety complaints were filed about the heat, mold, and broken equipment in the workplace, but workers said issues were not adequately addressed.

As of November 2022, five federal lawsuits have been filed against AppHarvest by its shareholders due to dissatisfaction with the significant decline in the company's stock price and allegations of fraud. Shareholders claim that AppHarvest's executives misrepresented the company's preparedness for its launch to investors and regulators, including the U.S. Securities and Exchange Commission. Additionally, the lawsuits allege that while these misleading actions took place, top executives were awarded substantial compensation in the form of millions of dollars.

In an August 2024 investigation CNN states that "Despite promising local jobs, the company eventually began contracting migrant workers from Mexico, Guatemala and other countries." The report quotes Shelby Hester, an AppHarvest crop care specialist, saying "They brought Mitch McConnell into the greenhouse, and they sent every single Hispanic worker home before he got there. He then proceeded to have a speech about how we were taking the jobs from the Mexicans."

== Locations ==
- Morehead (60 acres)
- Berea (15 acres)
- Richmond (60 acres)
- Somerset (30 acres)
