= MagForce =

German company

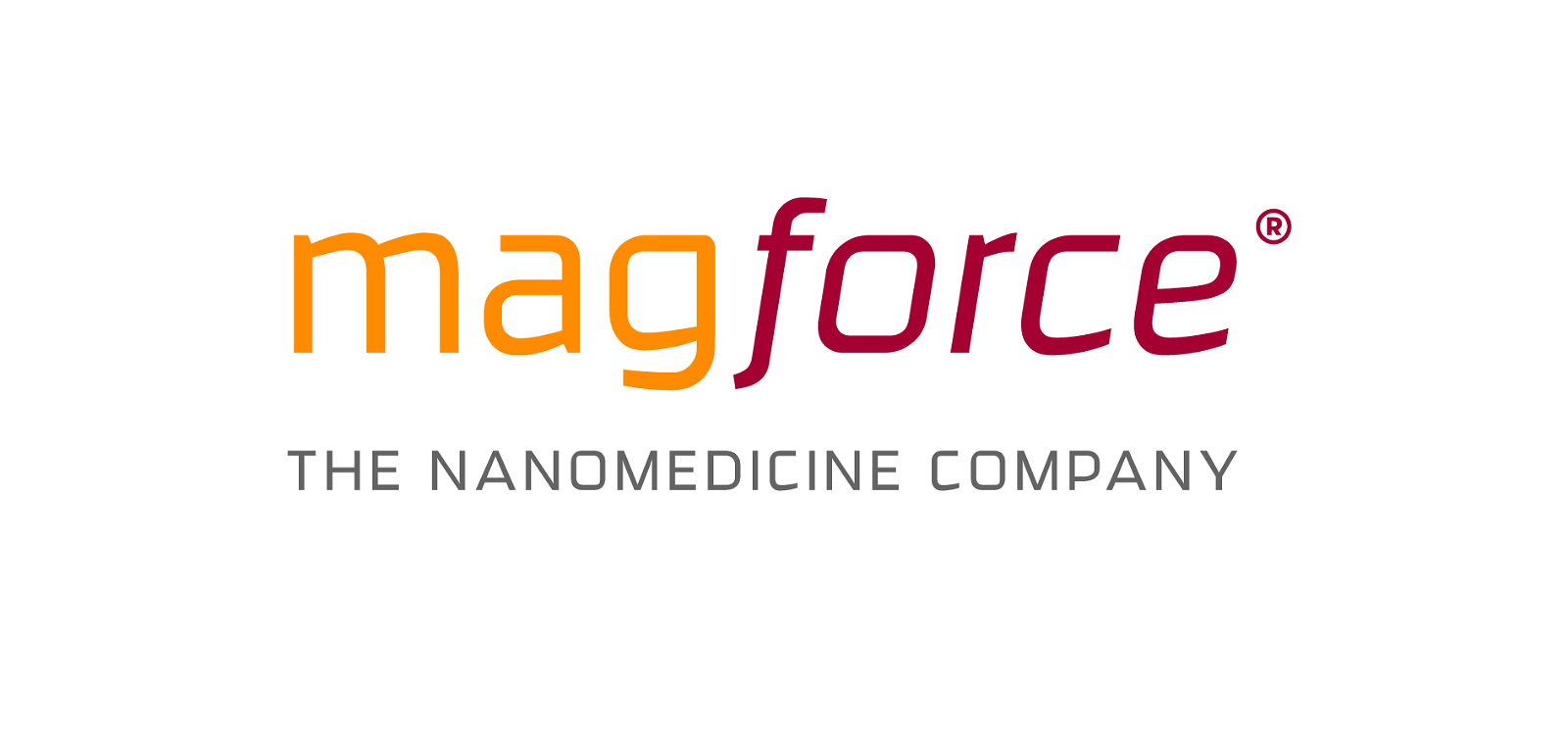
- Type: Joint-stock company
- Traded as: XETRA: MF6
- ISIN: DE000A0HGQF5
- Industry: Biomedical engineering
- Founded: 1997
- Headquarters: Berlin, Germany
- Key people: Ben J. Lipps (CEO) Hoda Tawfik (CMO) Christian von Volkmann (CFO)
- Products: Health care services, especially cancer therapy
- Number of employees: 25 (2017)
- Website: www.magforce.de

MagForce AG is a publicly traded German company based in Berlin, Germany that develops medical devices that generate magnetic hyperthermia to treat cancer. The company was founded in 1997 as a spin-off from Charité.

The medical technology company conducts research in the field of nano medicine. It was the first company to receive European authorisation for a medical device containing nanoparticles, in 2010.

== History ==
MagForce was founded in 1997 by Berlin biologist Andreas Jordan and biology engineer Regina Scholz, with Peter Heinrich later stepping in to manage the company.

MagForce AG was listed on the Frankfurt Stock Exchange in 2007. Having developed their NanoTherm, NanoPlan, and NanoActivator treatment systems, they received EU-wide certification (CE mark) and their first authorisation, specifically for the treatment of glioblastoma in 2010,

By 2013, sales of the system were poor; one reason for that was that the company had been run with little money, raising only about 11 million euros by 2010, and had scant clinical trial with which to convince oncologists that its system was effective and safe. The CEOs, Hoda Tawfik and Christian von Volkmann, re-evaluated the company's strategy, and raised 33.3 million euros, and used about half of that to retire debt. In September 2013, American Ben Lipps, who had previously led the DAX-listed Fresenius Medical Care Group, took over as the company's CEO. Lipps had played a crucial role in the widespread market adoption of dialysis procedures and was drawn to MagForce by his enthusiasm for innovative technology. In an interview with Die Welt, Lipps expressed optimism about MagForce's future, stating the company was" on the path to becoming a successful and highly profitable global player in oncology, with the potential to significantly improve the lives of cancer patients".

The company established a US subsidiary, which raised around $15M in 2014 to pursue US approval. The FOCUS reports in 2018 on the company's US strategy: with the specially founded subsidiary Magforce USA, Inc. is to be granted in the United States for the treatment of prostate cancer, which in the case of greater patient volume for faster refinancing of the research and would cause development costs. In 2018, the corresponding approval study was approved by the responsible authority Food and Drug Administration and is currently in the implementation. Ben Lipps: “FDA approval was a much greater success than the capital market has so far realized. It is important to understand that the FDA was classified as a medical technology product some time ago. The FDA requirements for a medical device are significantly less stressful and risky. If we can provide our forecast results in the upcoming study, which refers to the treatment of prostate cancer, we will quickly receive the commercial approval.”

In 2017, MagForce obtained a €35M euro investment from the European Investment Bank under the Juncker Plan.

In July 2022, the Management Board, in consultation with the Supervisory Board, began insolvency proceedings.

== Products & services ==
=== Nanotherm process ===
MagForce has developed a cancer treatment known as NanoTherm, which specifically targets solid tumours. The procedure involves a solution of iron oxide nanoparticles with superparamagnetic properties that is directly injected into the tumor. A couple of days later, the person with the tumor is placed inside a large piece of equipment similar to an MRI machine, also manufactured by MagForce, which creates a strong, fast-changing magnetic field. When exposed to an alternating magnetic field, the nanoparticles to oscillate at an extremely high speed, which in turn generates heat causing the temperature within the cancer cells to rise to as much as 70 degrees Celsius. This intense heat destroys the cancerous tissue, or significantly weakens it to a point that it is made more vulnerable to other treatments, like radiation. Typically, there are six such treatment sessions in the machine.

The equipment necessary to generate the alternating magnetic field was installed in clinics across German cities including Berlin, Cologne, Münster, Kiel, and Frankfurt. In early 2019, a mobile version of the apparatus was introduced in Lublin, eastern Poland. However, the relatively high acquisition costs of the technology have so far proved prohibitive for its commercial breakthrough. Another obstacle to the acceptance of the method is the lack of automatic reimbursement by health insurance companies. Reimbursements have, up to date, only been authorised throughout Europe, after patients have made private advance payments.
