= Task Force on New Americans =

The Task Force on New Americans is an interagency initiative to help immigrants learn English, embrace the common core of American civic culture, and fully become American. It was created in June 2006 by President George W. Bush. Established within the Department of Homeland Security, Secretary Michael Chertoff serves as Chair of the Task Force. Membership includes representatives from 12 Cabinet-level departments and a technical working committee of eight additional federal agencies. Alfonso Aguilar, Chief of the Office of Citizenship at U.S. Citizenship and Immigration Services (USCIS), serves as Chair of the Task Force's technical committee. The Task Force has worked to develop interagency initiatives to help immigrants settle in their new country and maximize the use of federal resources in promoting integration. By providing technical resources to communities and organizations, encouraging volunteerism, developing effective training methods, conducting targeted research efforts, and providing recommendations to the President, the Task Force has sought to encourage successful immigrant assimilation in a comprehensive manner. In December 2022 the Biden Administration announced it would relaunch the White House Task Force on New Americans.

== Activities ==
As a major Task Force initiative, the New Americans Project, seeks to encourage volunteerism among both U.S. citizens and new immigrants. The Task Force accomplished this through, among other projects, a zip code-based search engine listing volunteer opportunities to work with immigrants and a series of outreach events to promote volunteerism. In addition, the New Americans Project aims to provide opportunities for immigrants themselves to integrate into their communities by volunteering. The Task Force worked closely with the White House Office of USA Freedom Corps on this initiative.

The Task Force has provided public libraries, adult educators, and volunteers with training and resources to assist them in establishing programs to help immigrants settle in and learn about the United States.

- During 2007–2008, the Task Force began offering grants of educational materials, in the form of the Civics and Citizenship Toolkit, to immigrant-serving organizations. Initially provided to public libraries, the Toolkit is now available free of charge to all established immigrant-serving organizations through the website www.citizenshiptoolkit.gov. Since September 2007, more than 15,000 copies of the Toolkit have been distributed across the country. In addition, the Government Printing Office has distributed the Toolkit to the nearly 1,300 members of the Federal Depository Library Program.
- U.S. Civics and Citizenship Online: Resource Center for Instructors is a web-based tool hosted by USCIS offering teachers and volunteers a single source to locate resources to incorporate civics into English as a Second Language (ESL) instruction and prepare adult students for naturalization. The website includes links to curricula, lesson plans, teacher assessments, and other instructional material.
- In October 2007, USCIS and the Department of Education introduced EL/Civics Online, a web-based electronic training module for volunteers and adult educators. This valuable training resource includes courses and materials in U.S. government, U.S. history, the naturalization process, and civic engagement.
- To complement EL/Civics Online, USCIS convened more than 25 training conferences and workshops to help refine skills and prepare adult civics and citizenship instructors and volunteers for teaching American history, civics, and the naturalization process to immigrant students. More than 2,000 volunteers and adult educators have received this important training.

In February 2007, the Task Force began holding a series of roundtable discussions across the United States to learn more about successful immigrant integration practices. These roundtables helped gather input from immigrant-serving organizations, businesses, state and local governments, academia, community and faith-based organizations, adult educators, public libraries, foundations, and traditional civic organizations. Following these discussions, and with the collective experience and research of its members, the Task Force released a report entitled, Building an Americanization Movement for the Twenty-first Century: A Report to the President of the United States from the Task Force on New Americans. The report recommends strengthening assimilation efforts across the nation and among all sectors of society. The integration efforts described in this report are a federal call to action that defines a modern-day Americanization movement.

== Task Force membership ==
The Task Force consists of 12 cabinet-level departments and a technical working committee of eight federal agencies. They include: Department of Agriculture, Department of Commerce, Department of Defense, Department of Education, Department of Health and Human Services, Department of Homeland Security, Department of Housing and Urban Development, Department of the Interior, Department of Justice, Department of Labor, Department of State, Department of the Treasury, Corporation for National and Community Service, Federal Trade Commission, General Services Administration, Government Printing Office, Institute of Museum and Library Services, National Endowment for the Arts, National Endowment for the Humanities, and the Small Business Administration.
