= Fractyl Health =

American metabolic disease treatment company

Fractyl Health, Inc.
- Formerly: Fractyl Laboratories
- Company type: Public
- Traded as: Nasdaq: GUTS
- Industry: Metabolic diseases; Pharmaceutical
- Founded: 2010; 16 years ago
- Founders: Jay Caplan; Harith Rajagopalan
- Headquarters: Burlington, Massachusetts
- Key people: Harith Rajagopalan (CEO); Jay Caplan (President and Chief Product Officer)
- Number of employees: 88 (2024)
- Website: fractyl.com

Fractyl Health is a Burlington, Massachusetts-based healthcare company focused on metabolic diseases like obesity and type 2 diabetes. The company developed Revita, an outpatient endoscopic procedure to modify duodenal dysfunction, and Rejuva, a gene therapy platform in preclinical development to enable the pancreas to produce glucagon-like peptide-1 (GLP-1).

== History ==
Harith Rajagopalan, MD, PhD, and Jay Caplan established Fractyl Health, initially named Fractyl Laboratories, in 2010. The company's Revita device gained CE marking in April 2016 and became commercially available in the UK in January 2020. In April 2021, the US Food and Drug Administration (FDA) gave Revita breakthrough device designation to treat type 2 diabetes. The company changed its name to Fractyl Health in June 2021.

In April 2022, the FDA approved an investigational device exemption trial for Revita. It became available commercially in Germany in early 2023. The FDA issued additional breakthrough device designation to Revita in July 2024 for weight maintenance in certain people with type 2 diabetes or obesity.

Fractyl had an initial public offering on the Nasdaq in February 2024. As of February 2025, the company's REMAIN-1 study is evaluating Revita for patients with obesity to support weight maintenance after use of a GLP-1 drug. In January 2025, Fractyl announced it would focus research for Revita on obesity and people on GLP-1s, citing rising demand driven by the popularity of GLP-1s. The company also laid off some employees focused on type 2 diabetes treatment.

== Products ==
Fractyl's therapies focus on the root causes of metabolic diseases like obesity.

=== Revita ===
Revita is an outpatient endoscopic procedure that resurfaces the mucosal lining of the duodenum using ablation with water and heat. The duodenal lining can thicken with chronic high-fat and high-sugar diets; this can damage signaling mechanisms in the gastrointestinal tract and lead to metabolic disease. After resurfacing, a healthy mucosal layer can regrow over time, potentially improving blood sugar regulation and insulin sensitivity.

=== Rejuva ===
Rejuva is an adeno-associated virus (AAV)-based gene therapy platform to enable the pancreas to produce GLP-1 on an ongoing basis as a treatment for obesity and type 2 diabetes. The therapy targets dysfunctional beta islet cells in the pancreas. Delivery is done with a needle catheter to deliver viral vectors into the pancreas.

In January 2025, Rejuva completed Clinical Trial Application-enabling preclinical in vivo studies, beginning its first-in-human studies in the first half of 2025.
