= Family of JD Vance =

Extended family and heritage of JD Vance

Vance family
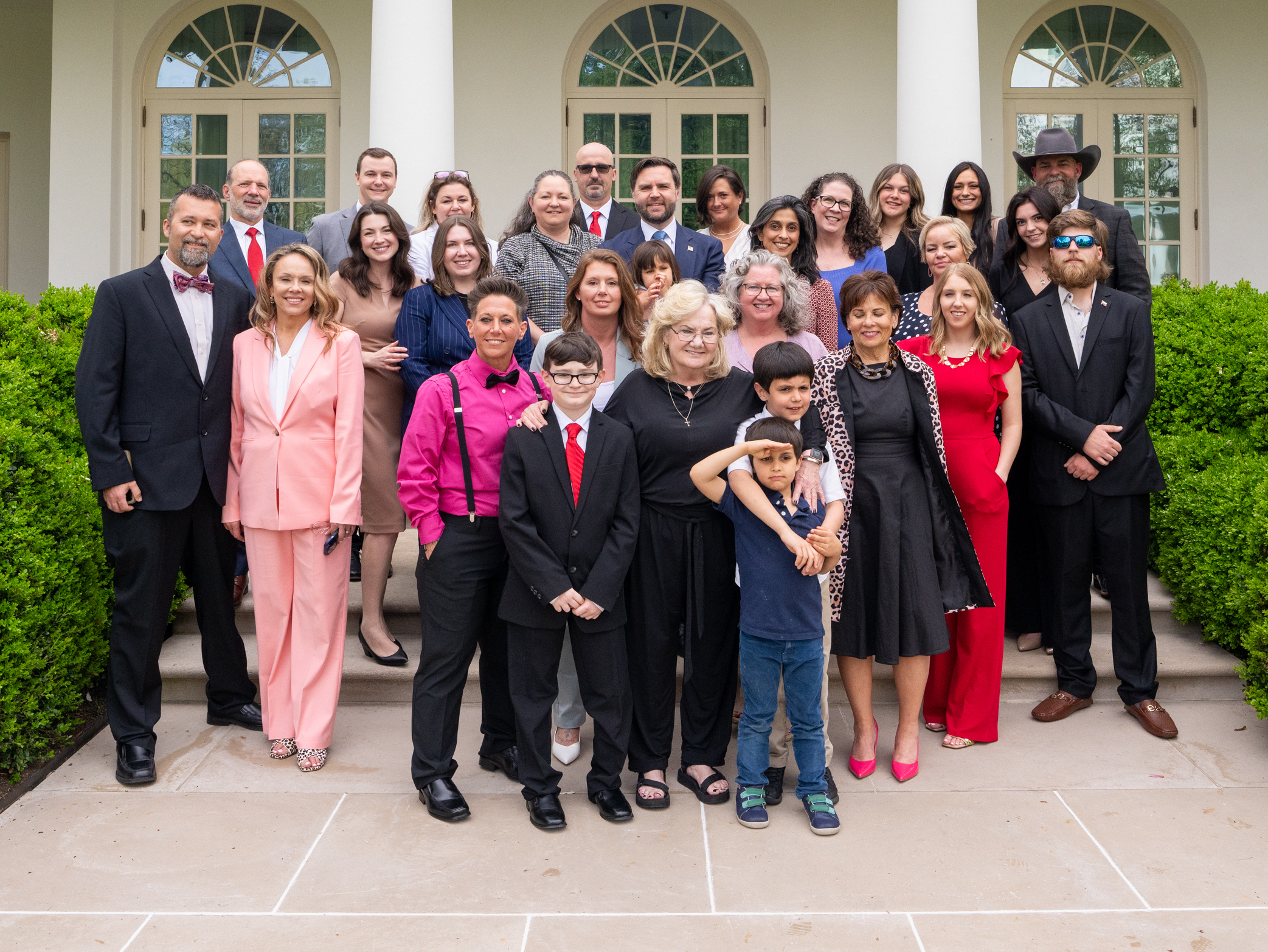
- JD Vance with his family in 2025
- Current region: Middletown, Ohio, U.S.
- Origin: Appalachian area of Kentucky, U.S.; Andhra Pradesh, India
- Titles: List: Vice President of the United States; Second Lady of the United States; Finance Chair of the Republican National Committee; United States Senator from Ohio
- Members: JD Vance; Usha Vance; Beverly Aikins; Donald Bowman
- Connected members: Beverly Aikins (mother); Donald Bowman † (father); Nate Vance (cousin)

JD Vance is an American politician and author who is the 50th vice president of the United States since 2025. Vance was formerly the junior United States senator from Ohio, and served in the U.S. Marine Corps as a military journalist in public affairs. His family is the second family of the United States since 2025 during Vance's vice presidency under Donald Trump.

Vance's ancestry comes from the Appalachian area of Kentucky. He is married to American lawyer Usha Vance.

== Ancestors ==
=== Abner Vance ===
Abner Vance (1760 or 1770 – July 16, 1819) was an American Revolutionary War veteran and murderer. He was also reportedly a preacher. He reportedly killed a man in 1817 and fled to Tug Fork. A few years later he was hanged for murder.

After he was hanged a folk song was made about him. The murder and subsequent execution is considered a founding an event for the Vances' settlement in Tug Fork Valley. Many of his descendants would be involved in the Hatfield-McCoy Feud. He is an ancestor of Vice President JD Vance.

== Immediate family ==
=== Usha Chilukuri ===
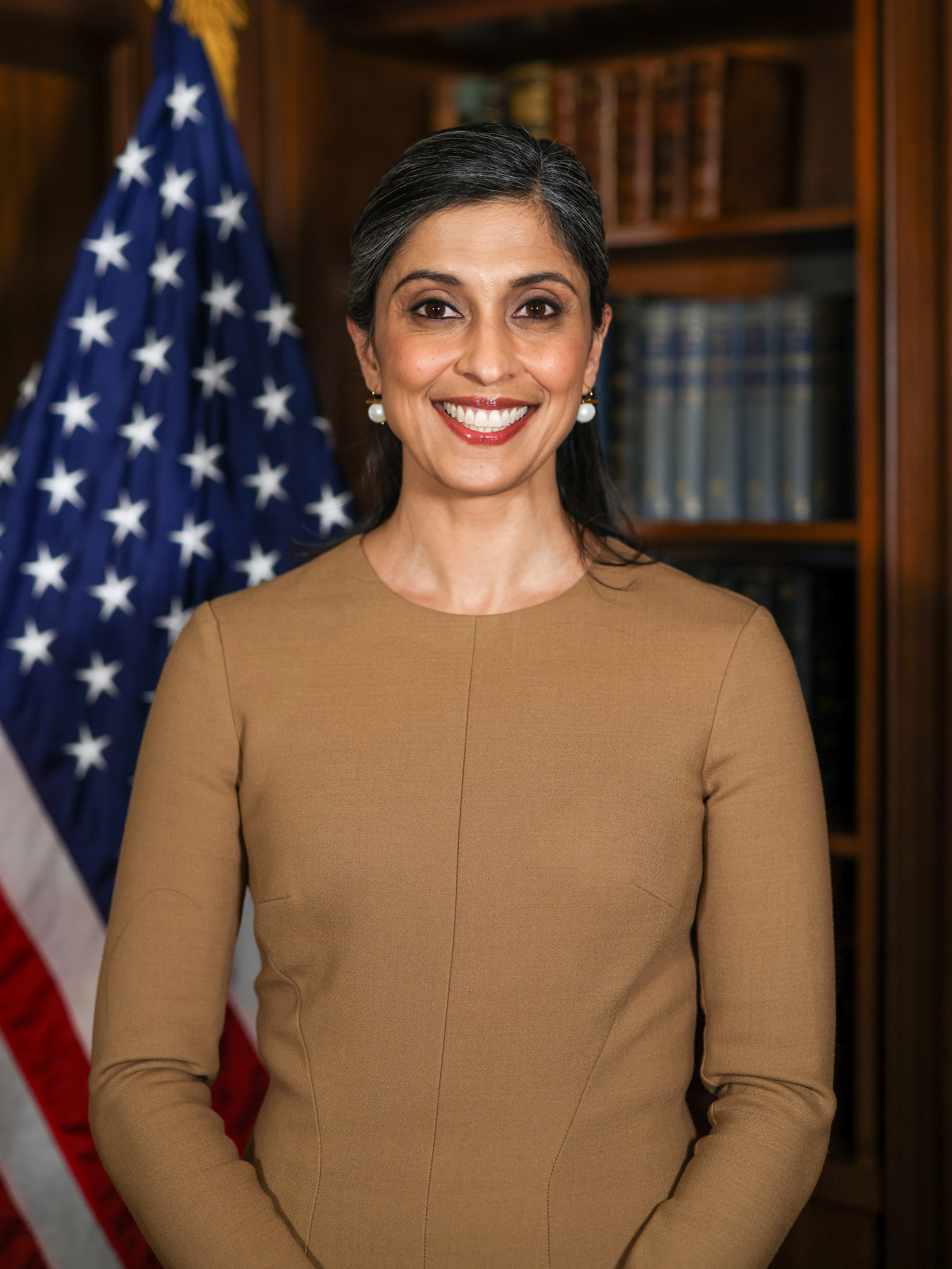
Second Lady of the United States Usha Vance in 2025

Usha Bala Vance (Note: Pronounced /ˈuːʃə/ OO-shə. Usha Vance's family originates from Telugu-speaking areas of India; in Telugu names the family name is usually put before the given name. Her name in Telugu order would be "Chilukuri Usha", and several relatives of hers have their names customarily in Telugu order.) (née Chilukuri) is the wife of JD Vance. She was born on January 6, 1986 in San Diego County, California, to Hindu parents, Lakshmi (née Yechuri) and Radhakrishna "Krish" Chilukuri, both Telugu Indian immigrants who immigrated to the U.S. in the 1980s from Andhra Pradesh.

She attended Yale University, graduating summa cum laude in 2007 with a bachelor's degree in history, with membership in Phi Beta Kappa. After graduating, she taught English and American history at Sun Yat-sen University. Vance then attended Clare College, Cambridge, in England, receiving a Master of Philosophy in early modern history in 2010. In 2013, Vance obtained her Juris Doctor from Yale Law School, where she met her future husband JD Vance. They married on June 14, 2014, and have four children.

=== Ewan Vance ===
Ewan Blaine Vance is the eldest son of JD and Usha Vance. He was born on June 4, 2017. He is being raised Christian alongside his brothers and sister.

=== Vivek Vance ===
Vivek Vance is the second son of JD and Usha Vance. He was born on February 12, 2020. On February 12, 2024, Vivek's 4th birthday, his father addressed the U.S. Senate expressing regret that he couldn't be with Vivek at his "birthday dinner," but assured his son "Daddy loves [him] very much" before reading the Dr. Seuss book Oh, The Places You'll Go! out loud.

=== Mirabel Vance ===
Mirabel Rose Vance is the only daughter of JD and Usha Vance. She was born in December 2021. She and her parents travelled to the Taj Mahal in April 2025.

=== Alec Vance ===
Alec Neel Vance is the youngest son of JD and Usha Vance. He was born on July 19, 2026.

== Parents ==
=== Beverly Vance ===
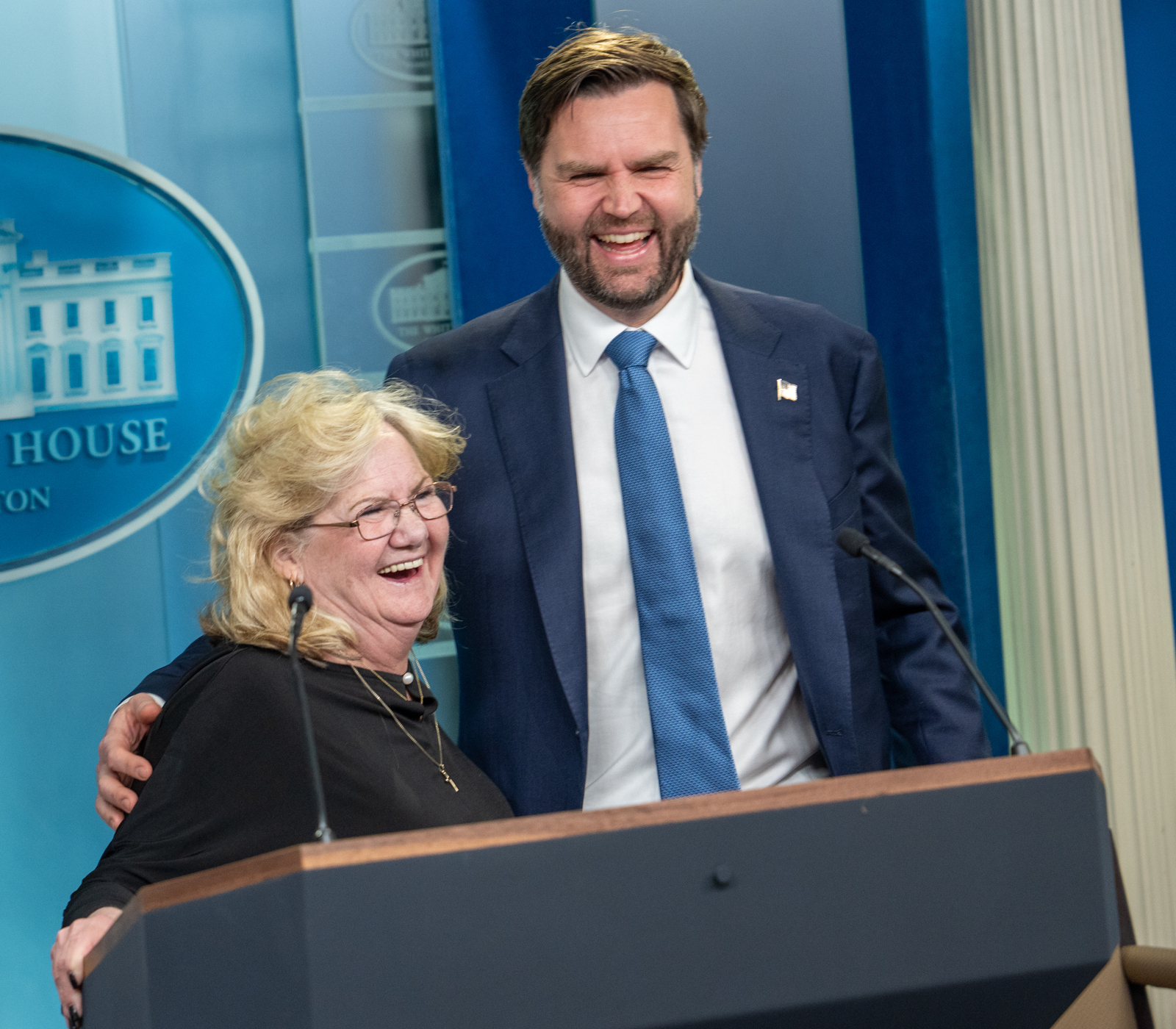
Beverly Vance with her son JD in 2025

Beverly Carol Aikins (née Vance) is the mother of JD Vance. She was born to Bonnie Eloise Blanton and James Lee Vance. She struggled with poverty and drug addiction most of her life. She worked as a licensed practical nurse, before she began to struggle with prescription substance abuse after one of her co-workers offered her drugs. She was fired and lost her nursing license after she got caught stealing morphine soon after. In 1979, at the age of 19, she had JD Vance's half-sister, Lindsay. She married Donald Bowman in 1983, a year before JD Vance was born. They divorced when JD Vance was only three years old. She eventually married her third husband, Bob Hamel, who adopted JD, renaming him James David Hamel, replacing her ex-husband's first name with her uncle’s name to preserve the "JD" nickname. After they divorced, she was married and divorced two more times, the last with a man surnamed Aikins.

When JD Vance was 12 years old, he was riding with Beverly in her car before she threatened to crash into a tree to kill them both. When the car came to a stop, JD successfully jumped out of the backseat window and ran to a nearby neighbor's house, who called the police. She was arrested and JD and his sister Lindsay were placed into the care of their grandparents, James Lee Vance and Bonnie Blanton. She began her journey to beating her addiction in 2015, and in 2025, she celebrated 10 years being sober with her son at the White House.

=== Donald Bowman ===
Donald Bowman
- Born: Donald Ray Bowman; August 15, 1959; Hamilton, Ohio, US
- Died: November 4, 2023 (aged 64); Hamilton, Ohio, US
- Other name: Big Don
- Occupation: Machinist
- Known for: Father of JD Vance
- Spouses: Beverly Vance (m. 1983, divorced); Cheryl McCarty (m. 1988)
- Children: 4

Donald Ray Bowman (August 15, 1959 – November 4, 2023) was the father of the 50th vice president of the United States, JD Vance.

Bowman died in 2023 at the age of 64, one year before his son was elected Vice President.

==== Early life and career ====
Bowman was born on August 15, 1959, to Donald C. Bowman and Melva Shepherd (née Baker). His father died when he was 16 months old, and his mother remarried Joseph Shepherd, who raised him.

Bowman graduated from Edgewood High School in 1979. He then worked as a machinist for over 13 years, for Hamilton Tool. After the company closed he became self-employed and ran a construction business, Bowman Construction & Excavating, for 30 years. He moved to Florida briefly in 2005 and obtained his Residential Contractor’s license. He built custom homes for the next three years in Auburndale, Florida. He then returned to Ohio in 2008.

==== Religion ====
Bowman was a member of River Church Cincinnati. His obituary reads, "He loved to pray, study the Word, worship and to be in the presence of God. He was a spiritual father and mentor to many, encouraging and praying for others, always looking for someone that he could help in any way."

==== Marriages ====
Bowman married Beverly in 1983 when he was 24 years old; he then became a stepfather to Lindsey Vance whom Vance had in her previous marriage which lasted a year. The following year the couple had a son, James Donald Bowman. The pair divorced when James was a toddler. Bowman and his wife Beverly had a custody battle over their son and then he gave his son up for adoption and Beverly had custody. He then did not see his son again until he was 12. His son later took "James David Vance" as his full name.

Bowman married Cheryl McCarty in 1988. The couple had several children including Ryan Green, JD, Cory Bowman, who ran in the 2025 Cincinnati mayoral election, and Chelsea Deal. The couple remained married until Bowman's death in 2023, a marriage of over 35 years.

==== Relationship with JD Vance ====
Bowman had a very complex relationship with his son. JD had talked about never really having a stable father figure, with his mother's repeated marriages and divorces.

JD's memoir includes how his dad gave him up for adoption when he was 6 years old, then disappeared for the next 6 years. JD also wrote about having a few memories of Bowman: he loved Kentucky and its beautiful mountains, and the rolling green horse country. He also knew Bowman drank RC Cola and that he had a very clear Southern accent.

He drank, but he stopped after he converted to Pentecostal Christianity. I always felt loved when I spent time with him, which was why I found it so shocking that he 'didn't want me anymore,' as Mom and Mamaw told me. He had a new wife with two small children, and I'd been replaced."

Bowman and his son reunited five years later and gained a closer relationship with time, particularly after Bowman told JD he had hired lawyers and tried to keep him. On June 26, 2021, on the social media network X, JD posted a picture of him and his dad at a political event with the caption, "Hanging with my dad at the Trump rally!"

==== Death ====
Bowman died on November 4, 2023, aged 64 from esophageal cancer. Bowman is buried at the Warrens Chapel Cemetery in Vincent, Kentucky. JD Vance and all his family attended his funeral service.

==== Legacy ====
In 2016, JD Vance published his memoir Hillbilly Elegy, in which he portrays his father as an absent man who gave up his 6-year-old son and parental rights. Vance shares how he felt a sense of abandonment, and describes how he had to frequently mold his own personality with no real father figure, with his mom repeatedly having new husbands and boyfriends. JD had spent years believing his father simply walked out on him with no care for him.

JD Vance's birth certificate

Years after the book was written, Bowman sat down with his son and gave his perspective. Bowman explained that the adoption was not about abandonment but it was a last resort to step back during an intense custody battle that was destroying Vance. After hearing this, the emotional wound between Bowman and his son could heal.

== Other relatives ==
=== Lindsay Lewis ===
Lindsay Leigh Ratliff (née Lewis) is the elder half-sister of JD Vance. She was born in 1979. Amid their mother’s abuse, JD Vance noted that Lindsay was a source of "comfort and protection" for him. Later in life, she got married and had three children. She is an aunt to JD Vance's four children.

=== Cory Bowman ===
Cory Bowman (born November 1988) is the younger half-brother of JD Vance. He was born to Donald Bowman and his second wife, Cheryl McCarty. Bowman was also the Republican nominee in the 2025 Cincinnati mayoral election, losing to the incumbent mayor. Bowman and Vance had not met until they were teenagers as a result of his fathers adoption with JD. Bowman is married and has four children. He is uncle to JD Vance's four children.

=== Bonnie Blanton ===
Bonnie Eloise Vance (née Blanton; April 16, 1933 – April 24, 2005) was the maternal grandmother of JD Vance. She was born on April 16, 1933 to Blaine Blanton and Hattie Blanton (née Hounshell), along with her three brothers. At the age of 13, she and her family moved to Ohio. She married James Lee Vance in 1947.

Bonnie and James primarily raised JD Vance and his half-sister due to Beverly's drug addiction. On April 24, 2005, she died of pneumonia in Butler County, Ohio.

=== Nate Vance ===
Nate Vance is JD Vance's first cousin. He was born in 1978 to James "Jim" Vance (maternal uncle of JD Vance and son of James Lee Vance and Bonnie Eloise Blanton). He enlisted in the U.S. Marine Corps at age 17 in 1995.

Following Russia's full-scale invasion of Ukraine in February 2022, Vance traveled to Lviv to help. He was formally discharged from Ukrainian service in January 2025.

=== Lakshmi Chilukuri ===
Lakshmi Chilukuri is Second Lady Usha Vance's mother and JD Vance's mother-in-law. She is the provost of Sixth College and a Biological Sciences professor at the University of California, San Diego.

== See also ==
- Family of Donald Trump
- Family of Barack Obama
- Family of Joe Biden
- Family of Mike Pence
- Family of Kamala Harris
