= Kutumba Rao =

Kutumba Rao or Kutumbarao is an Indian (Telugu) name and may refer to:

- Kodavatiganti Kutumba Rao, prolific Indian writer
- Turlapaty Kutumba Rao, Indian writer

== See also ==
- Kutumbam (disambiguation)
