= Yechuri =

Yechuri (Telugu: ఏచూరి) or Yechury is a Telugu surname. Notable people with the surname include:

- Lakshmi Chilukuri (née Yechuri) (born 1961), Indian-American microbiologist, educator, and academic administrator
- Sitaram Yechury (1952–2024), Indian politician
