= Sarvepalli Gopal =

Indian historian

- Born: 23 April 1923; Chennai, India
- Died: 20 April 2002 (aged 78); Chennai, Tamil Nadu, India
- Occupation: Historian
- Spouse: Kaveri/Indira Ramaswami (1949)
- Parent(s): Sarvepalli Radhakrishnan (father); Sarvepalli Sivakamu (mother)
- Writing career
- Subject: Indian History
- Notable awards: Padma Vibhushan, 1999 (for his contribution to Indian history)

Sarvepalli Gopal (Note: In this Telugu name, the surname is Sarvepalli.) (Note: In this Telugu name, the person is referred to by his given name, Gopal, and not by his surname, Sarvepalli.) (23 April 1923 – 20 April 2002) was a well-known Indian historian. He was the son of Sarvepalli Radhakrishnan, the first Vice-President and the second President of India. He was the author of the Radhakrishnan: A Biography and Jawaharlal Nehru: A Biography.

== Early life and education ==
Sarvepalli Gopal was born in Madras, India, on 23 April 1923 into a middle-class family. He was the only son of S. Radhakrishnan, the first vice-president and second president of independent India, and Sivakamu. He had five sisters.

Gopal was educated at Mill Hill School in London and at the Madras Christian College. He was an undergraduate student of history at Balliol College, Oxford, where he won the Curzon Prize. He continued as a student at Balliol earning his PhD on the viceroyalty of Lord Ripon in 1951.

== Career ==
Subsequently, he was appointed as a Director in the Ministry of External Affairs, Government of India, in the 1950s, where he worked closely with Prime Minister Jawaharlal Nehru. In the 1960s, he was a Reader in Indian History at St Antony's College, Oxford. When the new Jawaharlal Nehru University was founded by the then Prime Minister, Indira Gandhi, he was appointed as a Professor of History at the Centre for Historical Studies, which he helped in setting up. In the 1970s, he was a Chairman of the National Book Trust, New Delhi.

== Death ==
Gopal died due to kidney failure in Chennai on 20 April 2002, three days before his 79th birthday.

== Publications ==
=== Books ===
- History of Humanity: Scientific and Cultural Development, Vol. 7: The Twentieth Century, (Paris: UNESCO, Routledge, 2008) (co-author Tichvinskii, Sergei Leonidovich)
- Jawaharlal Nehru: A Biography, (Delhi: Oxford University Press, 2004)
- The Essential Writings of Jawaharlal Nehru, (New Delhi: Oxford University Press, 2003) (co-author Uma Iyengar)
- Anatomy of Confrontation: The Babri Masjid Ramjanmabhumi Issue, (New Delhi: Viking, 1991)
- Radhakrishnan: A Biography, (Delhi: Oxford University Press, 1992)
- Economy, Society and Development: Essays and Reflections in Honour of Malcolm Adesheshiah, (New Delhi: Sage, 1991) (co-authors Kurien, C.T., E.R. Prabhakar)
- Jawaharlal Nehru: An Anthology, (Delhi: Oxford University Press, 1983)
- Selected Works of Jawaharlal Nehru, (New Delhi: Orient Longman, 1972–82) (co-authors Chalapatti Rau, M., Sharada Prasad, H.Y., Nanda, B.R.)
- British Policy in India, 1858-1905, (Cambridge: Cambridge University Press, 1965)
- Modern India, (London: Historical Association, 1967)
- The Viceroyalty of Lord Irwin, 1926-1931, (Oxford: Clarendon Press, 1957)
- The Viceroyalty of Lord Ripon, 1880-1884, (London: Oxford University Press, 1953)
- The Permanent Settlement in Bengal and its Result, (London, G.Allen and Unwin, 1949)
