= Beverly Vance =

Mother of U.S. vice president JD Vance

Beverly Aikins
- Aikins in 2025 at the White House
- Born: Beverly Carol Vance; January 20, 1961 (age 65); Middletown, Ohio, U.S.
- Other names: Beverly Hamel; Beverly Lewis; Beverly Bowman
- Occupation: Registered nurse
- Known for: Mother of Vice President JD Vance
- Political party: Independent
- Other political affiliations: Republican
- Spouses: Jeffrey Lewis (m. 1980; div. 1981); Donald Bowman (m. 1983; div. 1985); Robert Hamel (m. 1988; div. 1995); Ken Walker (m. 2000, divorced); Terry Aikins (m. 2006; div. 2014)
- Children: 2, including JD
- Parents: James Vance; Bonnie Blanton
- Relatives: Vance family

Beverly Carol Aikins (née Vance; born January 20, 1961) is an American registered nurse who is the mother of the 50th vice president of the United States, JD Vance. While well known by her maiden name, Vance, she now goes by the name Beverly Aikins.

Aikins has married and divorced five times. Through her marriages she had two children, Lindsay, and JD Vance, who would serve as a United States senator from Ohio from 2023 to 2025 and later as vice president of the United States. Aikins struggled with addiction and lost custody of her children after allegedly attempting to crash a car and kill her son. She said that the incident is what caused her to want to change. She became clean in 2015 and has been drug and alcohol-free for over ten years. She celebrated this achievement at the White House in 2025 with her family.

In 2016, Aikins' son JD had his book Hillbilly Elegy published, which describes his relationship with his mother and what she went through. In 2020, a film by the same name was released, based on the book; Aikins is portrayed in the film by Amy Adams.

== Early life, education and career ==
Beverly Vance was born on January 20, 1961 the day of the Inauguration of John F. Kennedy. She was born to James Lee Vance and Bonnie Blanton. When she was younger her father was an alcoholic and constantly came home drunk. This created a chaotic upbringing and childhood while growing up. When she was younger her mother had allegedly set her father on fire when he came home drunk one night.

== Marriages and family ==
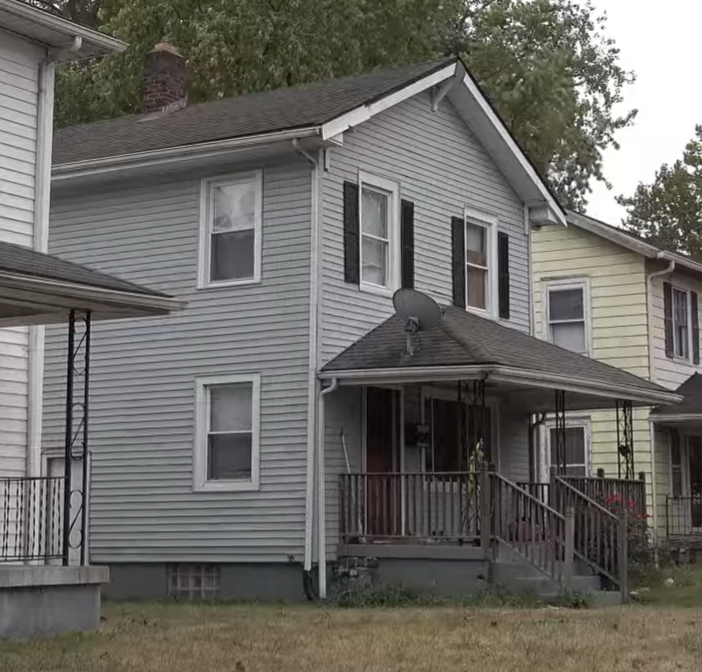
Home where Beverly lived with her parents in between her marriages

Aikins has been married five times and divorced five times. She was first married in 1980 to Jeffrey James Lewis when she was 19 years old, in a relationship during which Lindsay Lewis was born. Beverly then married Donald Bowman and they had one son: James Donald Bowman, better known as JD Vance, born when she was 24 years old. Aikins and Bowman divorced while JD was a toddler. Aikins then married Bob Hamel, and had her children's last names changed to his. After they divorced, Aikins married and divorced two more times, the last with a man named Terry Aikins. Between marriages, she and her children lived with her parents in Ohio or her sister Lori.

== Addiction and recovery ==
=== Addiction ===
Aikins relates her story to the national opioid epidemic, in which drug dependency often ruins a family unit. As a licensed practical nurse, Aikins had access to prescription painkillers while working in a hospital. After taking prescription opioids, she developed an escalating dependency. According to National Institute on Drug Abuse, the progression from misuse to illicit substances like heroin is an established trajectory of the opioid epidemic. Beverly experienced this progression, which affected her whole life. She recalls how she lost trust in her family and they never wanted to see her, and how she lost her job as a nurse. This addiction went on for decades.

=== Recovery ===
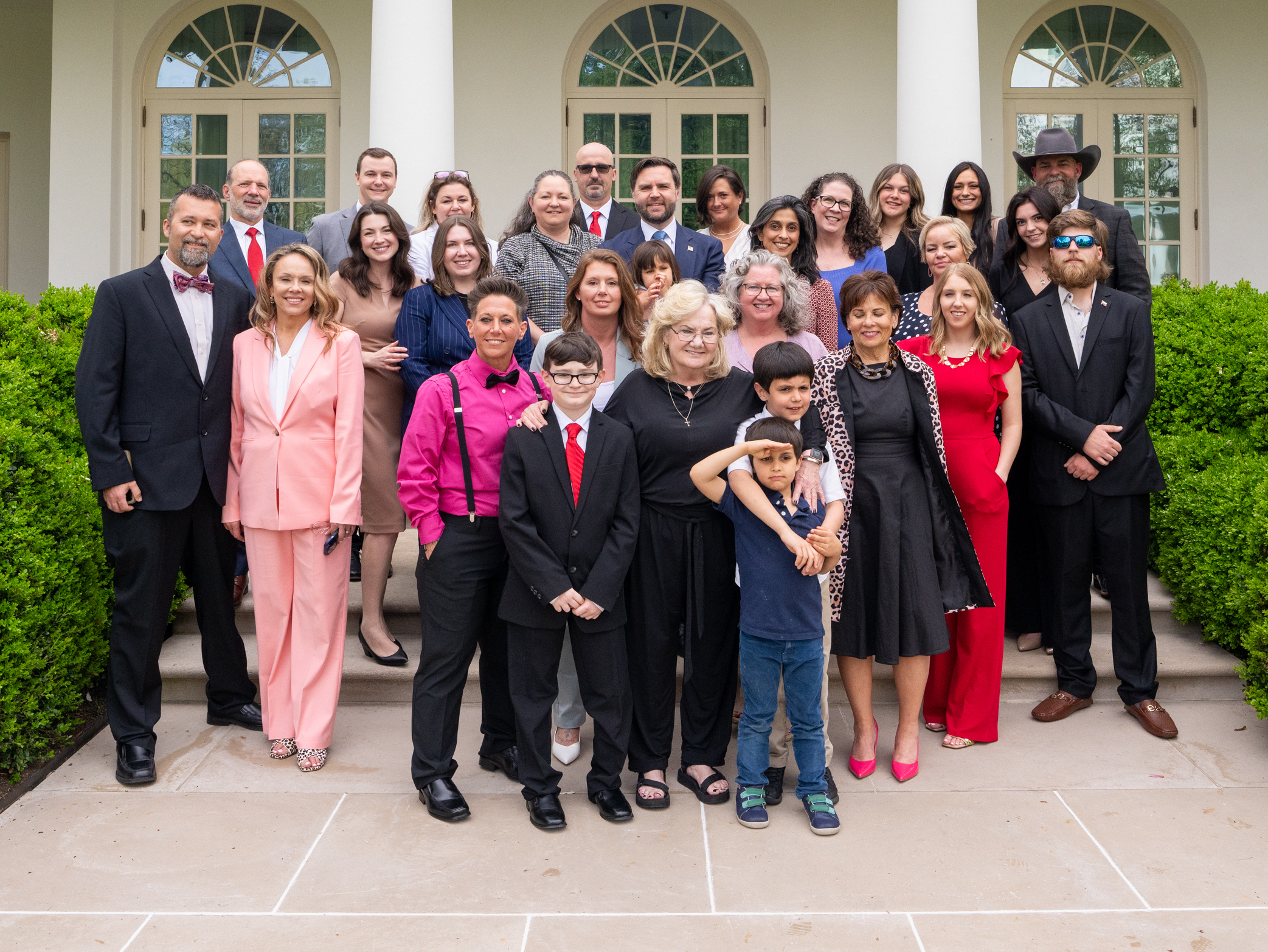
Beverly Vance Aikins celebrates her 10th year of sobriety in a Roosevelt Room ceremony.

Recovery for Aikins from substance use disorder was not fast and often failed. Her recovery was supported by attending sobriety meetings and moving into a sober living house. Many in Aikins' family had to deal with addiction, and her recovery broke a multi-generational pattern.

Aiming to transform her personal recovery into professional purpose, she successfully regained her nursing credentials and began working as a nurse at an addiction treatment facility in the Cincinnati metropolitan area. Through her recovery she has helped others, cited as a representation that recovery was possible. She also attends programs with the intention of helping attendants. She has said that some family members, such as cousins, still do not forgive her but both her kids and all her grandkids do and that she wants to help prevent her grandchildren from making the choices she did.

In April 2025, Aikins celebrated 10 years of sobriety in the Roosevelt Room of the White House.

=== Relationship with JD and current life ===
Aikins with her son in 2025

JD Vance and his mother used to have a rough relationship. After attempting to kill a young JD in a car accident, Aikins lost custody of her children and JD and Lindsay were placed with her parents. Their relationship improved with time after Aikins went to recovery, before which they had no relationship. In JD's book Hillbilly Elegy, he writes that he had wished he had never met his mother, though the two went on to mend their relationship.

While writing his memoir, JD asked his mother for permission to publish it, to which she agreed, explaining she wanted her son to get the sense of relief he sought through writing the book. When Vance was selected as the nominee for Vice President of the United States at the 2024 Republican National Convention, he had a speech written about his mother and asked if he could use it. Once more, she agreed, claiming that she wanted people to see that recovery is possible. Aikins has said that she and her daughter speak every day, but that she speaks less than she would like with her son due to his busy schedule. She said her son occasionally texts 'I love you', which brightens her day. She said that while she and JD do not agree on everything politically, they do not let this get in the way of their relationship.

JD Vance said of his mother at the 2024 Republican National Convention: "Our movement is about single moms like mine who struggled with money and addiction but never gave up."

In 2026. Aikins said that her daughter-in-law Usha Vance was one of the nicest people she had ever met in her life.

== Legacy and recognition ==
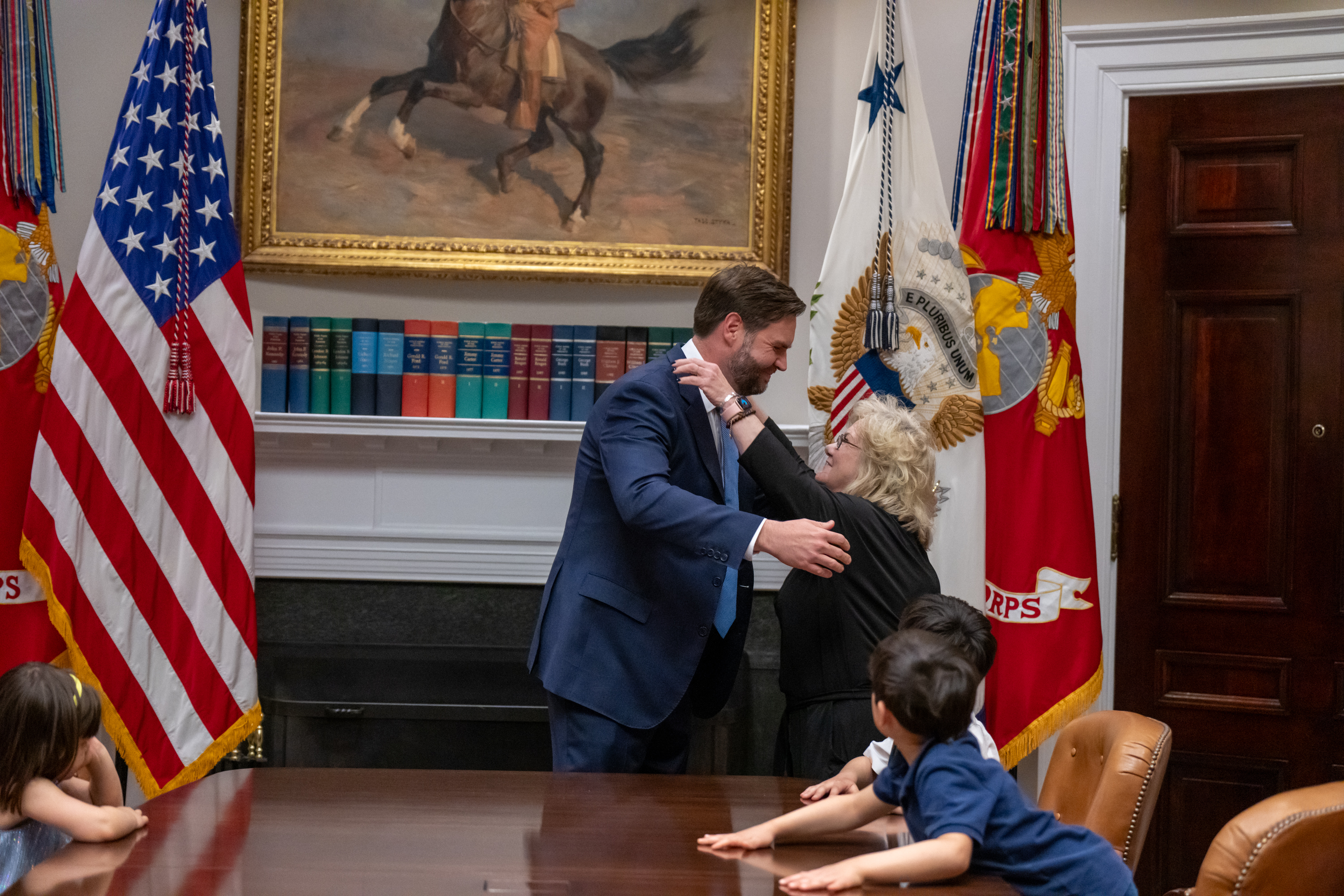
Aikins hugging her son, JD Vance

Aikins' son wrote a 2018 memoir Hillbilly Elegy and sold rights to a same-named film (2020) about his life and the impact his mother's addiction and recovery had on him. She gave JD permission to publish the book, knowing the book would not be favorable toward her, but felt hurt that she was not invited to a party he held to celebrate the book's best seller status with The New York Times.

In the film adaptation of the book, her character is portrayed by Amy Adams, whom Aikins praised for her performance. Aikins negotiated payment for permission to include her character.

== See also ==
- Usha Vance (daughter-in-law)
