= Kutumbam =

Kutumbam means "family" in Sanskrit and may refer to:

- Manchi Kutumbam, a 1965 Indian Telugu-language film by V. Madhusudan Rao
- Ummadi Kutumbam, a 1967 Indian Telugu-language film by D. Yoganand

== See also ==
- Kudumbam (disambiguation)
- Kutumba Rao (disambiguation), an Indian personal name
- Kutumba (Vidhan Sabha constituency), electoral constituency in Bihar, India
- Kutumba, a 2003 Indian film
- Kutumb (TV series), an Indian TV series
- Kutumb The Family, a 2017 Indian film
