= Padma Shri =

Fourth highest civilian award of India

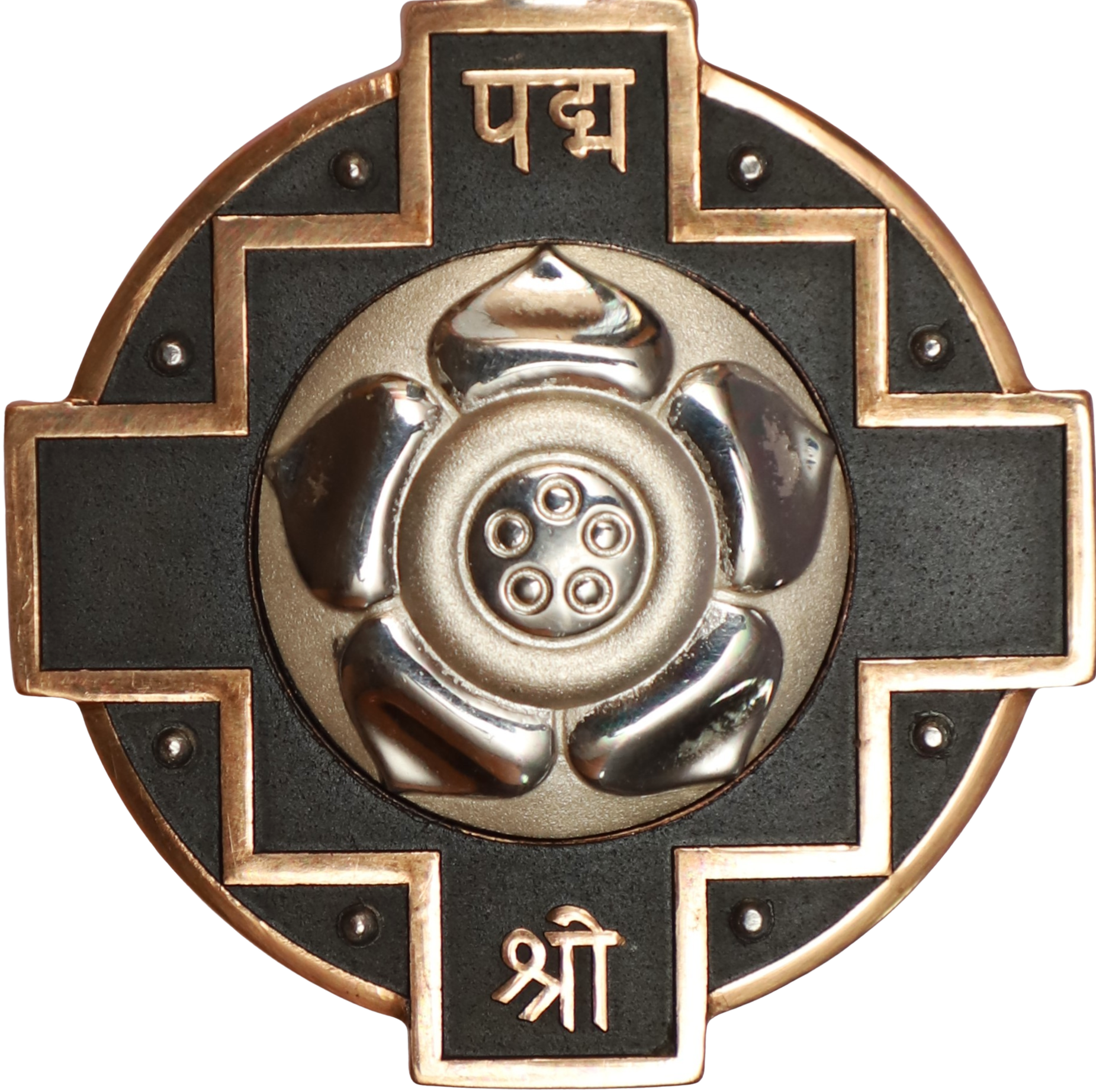
- Medallion of Padma Shri
- Type: National Civilian
- Country: India
- Presented by: Government of India
- Ribbon
- Obverse: A centrally located lotus flower is embossed and the text "Padma" written in Devanagari script is placed above and the text "Shri" is placed below the lotus.
- Reverse: A platinum State Emblem of India placed in the centre with the national motto of India, "Satyameva Jayate" (Truth alone triumphs) in Devanagari Script
- Established: 1954; 72 years ago
- First award: 1954
- Final award: 2026

Highlights
- Total: 3759
- Website: padmaawards.gov.in

Precedence
- Next (higher): Kirti Chakra (military); Padma Bhushan (civilian)
- Next (lower): Sarvottam Jeevan Raksha Padak

The Padma Shri (Sanskrit: Padma Śrī, lit. 'Lotus Honour') is the fourth-highest civilian award of the Republic of India, after the Bharat Ratna, the Padma Vibhushan and the Padma Bhushan. Instituted on 2 January 1954, the award is conferred in recognition of "distinguished contribution in various spheres of activity including the arts, education, industry, literature, science, acting, medicine, social service and public affairs". It is awarded by the Government of India every year on India's Republic Day.

== History ==
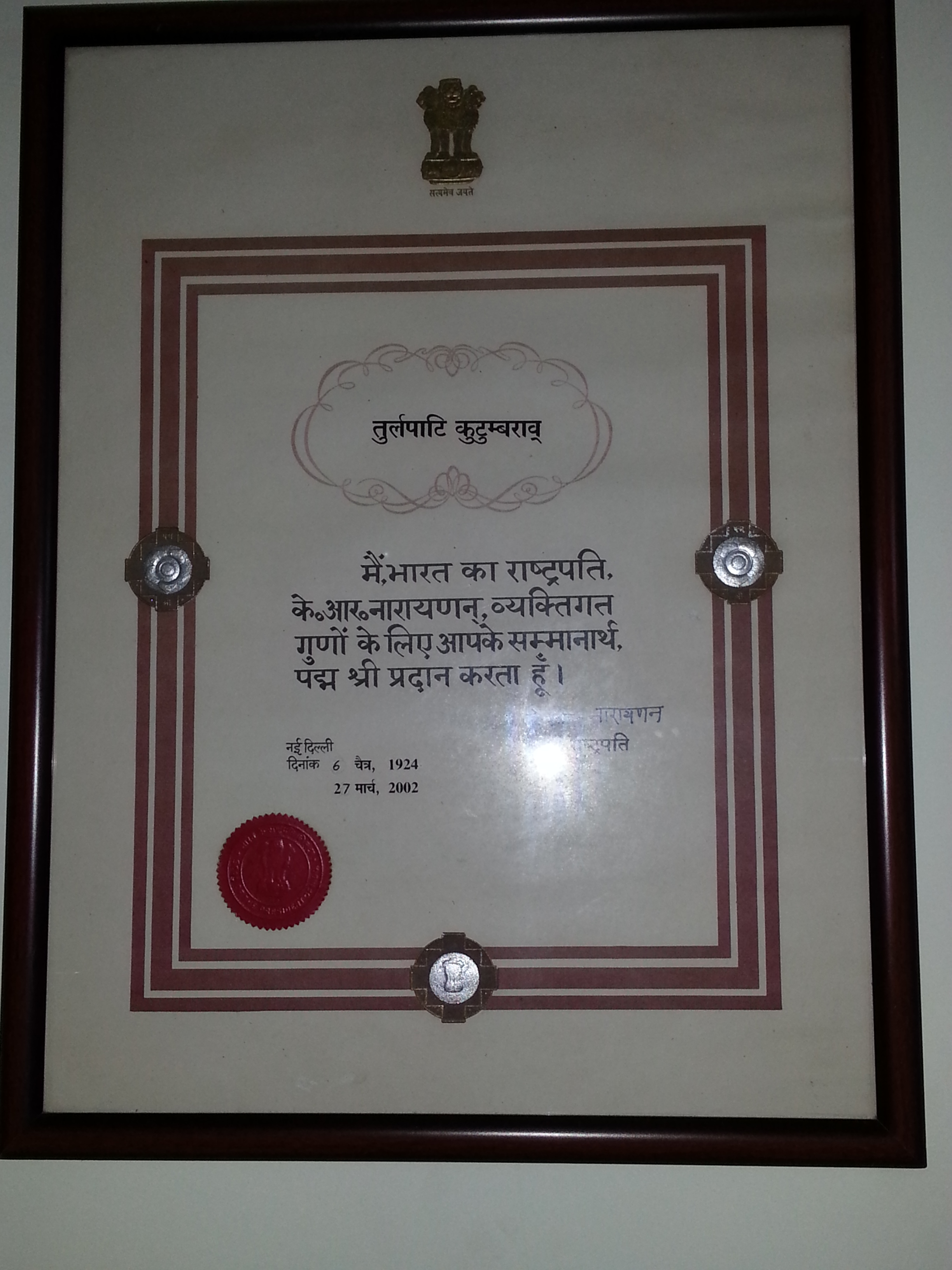
Padma Shri certificate during the presidency of K. R. Narayanan awarded to Telugu journalist Turlapaty Kutumba Rao

Padma Awards were instituted in 1954 to be awarded to citizens of India in recognition of their distinguished contribution in various spheres of activity including the arts, education, industry, literature, science, acting, medicine, social service and public affairs. It has also been awarded to some distinguished individuals who were not citizens of India but did contribute in various ways to India.

The selection criteria have been criticised in some quarters with the claim that many highly deserving artists have been left out in order to favour certain individuals. India has now created an online nomination platform for the common citizens to recommend the nomination for the annually given civilian "Padma" awards.

On its obverse, the words "Padma", meaning lotus in Sanskrit, and "Shri", a Sanskrit-derived honorific equivalent to 'Mr.' or 'Ms.' (i.e., "Noble One in Blossom"), appear in Devanagari above and below a lotus flower. The geometrical pattern on either side is in burnished bronze. All embossing is in white gold.

As of 2025, 3448 people have received the award. In 2025, 113 people received the Padma Shri.

== Refusals ==
Several intended recipients, including musician Hemanta Kumar Mukherjee, sitar player Vilayat Khan, academic and author Mamoni Raisom Goswami, journalist Kanak Sen Deka and noted Bollywood screenwriter Salim Khan, have declined the Padma Shri for various reasons. Some intended recipients, such as environmental activist Sunderlal Bahuguna and English billiards champion Michael Ferreira, have refused the honour but have subsequently accepted a more prestigious one such as the Padma Bhushan or Padma Vibhushan. Other individuals, such as film-maker Aribam Syam Sharma, author Phanishwar Nath 'Renu', Punjabi author Dalip Kaur Tiwana and noted poet Jayanta Mahapatra, have returned the honour after initially accepting it.

In 2022, Bengali singer "Gitashri" Sandhya Mukhopadhyay, aged 90, turned down her offer for the Padma Shri award on the eve of the 73rd Republic Day (India). As per media reports, the veteran singer turned down the offer since she believes that her career spanning eight decades deserved a higher award than the Padma Shri. "Padma Shri is more deserving for a junior artiste", her daughter said. Based on her refusal, her name was not included in the Padma awardees list for 2022.

== See also ==
- Lists of Padma Shri award recipients
