= Usha Vance =

Second Lady of the United States since 2025

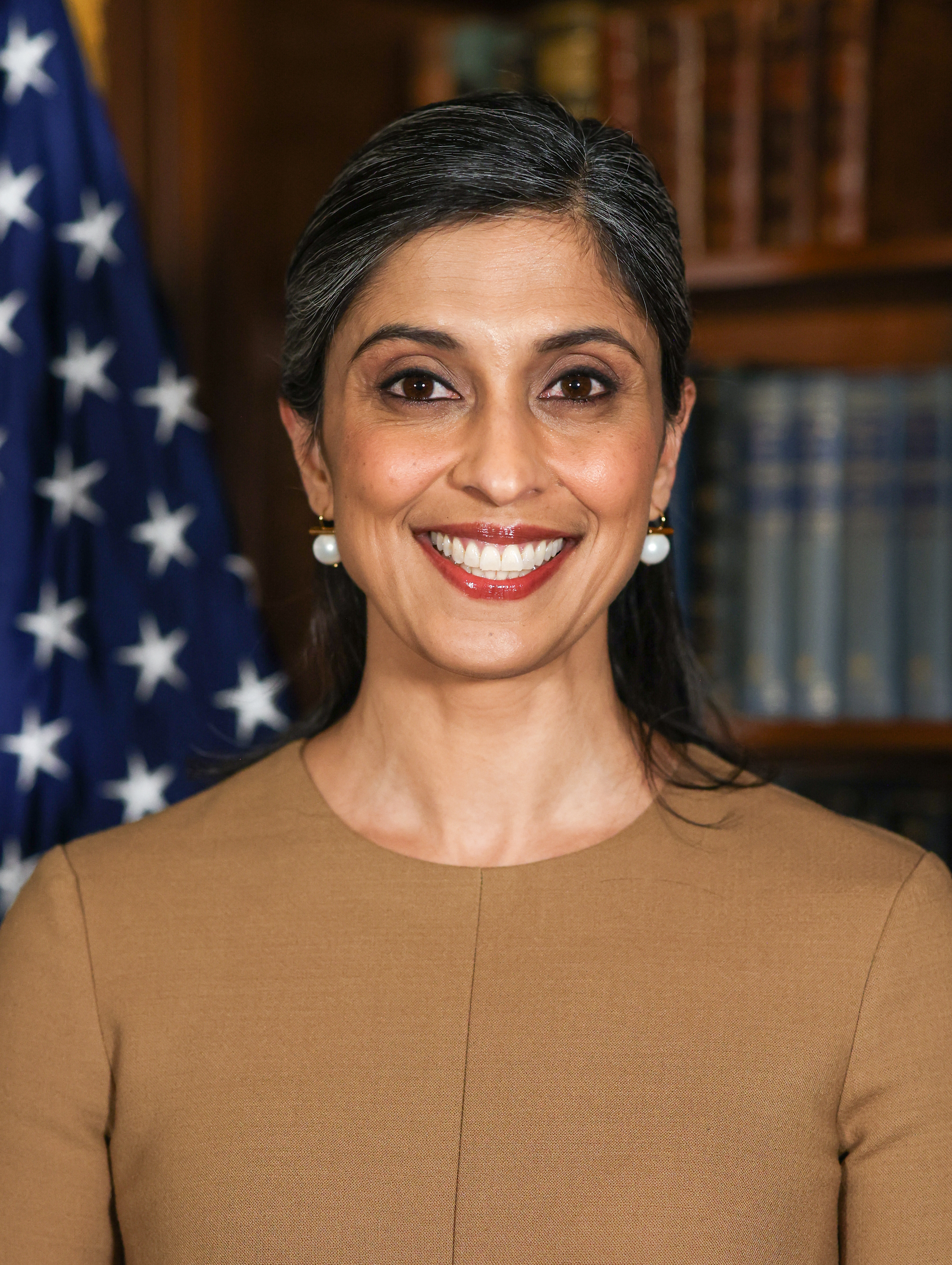
- Official portrait, 2025

Second Lady of the United States
- Current
- Assumed role January 20, 2025
- Vice President: JD Vance
- Preceded by: Doug Emhoff (Note: as second gentleman)

Personal details
- Born: Usha Bala Chilukuri; January 6, 1986 (age 40) San Diego County, California, U.S.
- Party: Republican (since 2022)
- Other political affiliations: Democratic (until 2014); Independent (2014–2022)
- Spouse: JD Vance (m. 2014)
- Children: 4
- Parent: Lakshmi Yechuri (mother)
- Relatives: Vance family (by marriage)
- Education: Yale University (BA, JD); Clare College, Cambridge (MPhil)
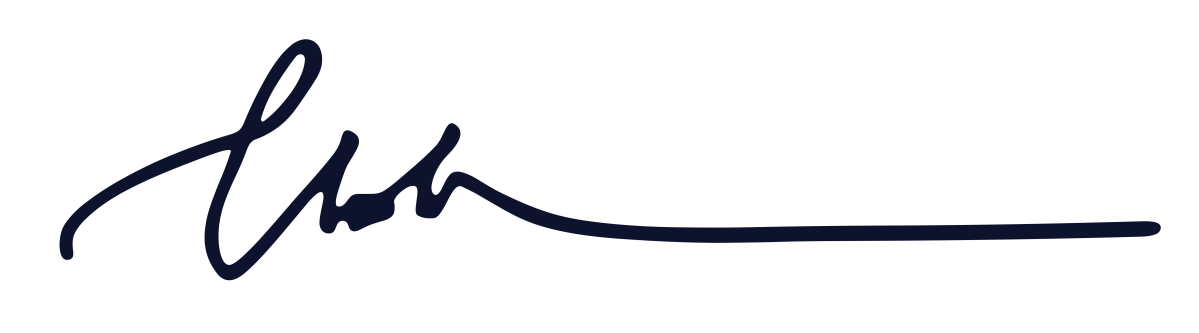
- Signature
- Vance's voice Vance reading The Tale of Peter Rabbit by Beatrix Potter; Recorded March 30, 2026

Usha Bala Vance (Note: Pronounced /ˈuːʃə/ OO-shə. Usha Vance's family originates from Telugu-speaking areas of India; in Telugu names the family name is usually put before the given name. Her name in Telugu order would be "Chilukuri Usha", and several relatives of hers have their names customarily in Telugu order.) (née Chilukuri; born January 6, 1986) is an American lawyer and second lady of the United States since 2025, being the wife of JD Vance, the 50th vice president of the United States. She is the first Asian American and Hindu American second lady of the US.

Vance was born in San Diego County, California, to Telugu immigrant parents and raised in an upper-middle-class suburb. She graduated from Yale University with a bachelor's degree in history and from Yale Law School with a Juris Doctor, after which she served as a law clerk for several senior federal judges—including Chief Justice John Roberts, Judge Brett Kavanaugh, and Judge Amul Thapar.

In 2019, Vance was admitted to the District of Columbia Bar, subsequently working for a law firm handling civil litigation and appeals in cases involving higher education, local government, entertainment, and technology. She resigned from the firm in July 2024. At the 2024 Republican National Convention, Vance delivered the introductory address for the election campaign of her husband and attended many of his campaign events—often appearing onstage in support of his bid for the vice presidency.

== Early life and education ==
Usha Bala Chilukuri was born on January 6, 1986 in San Diego County, California, to Hindu parents, Lakshmi (née Yechuri) and Radhakrishna "Krish" Chilukuri, both Telugu Indian immigrants who immigrated to the U.S. in the 1980s from Andhra Pradesh. Her father is a mechanical engineer from IIT Madras and a lecturer at San Diego State University, and her mother is a molecular biologist and provost at the University of California, San Diego. She was raised in San Diego's upper-middle-class Rancho Peñasquitos neighborhood. She has one sister, Shreya.

In 2003, Vance graduated from Mt. Carmel High School, where she performed on flute in the marching band. Childhood friends described her as a "leader" and a "bookworm". She attended Yale University, graduating summa cum laude in 2007 with a bachelor's degree in history, with membership in Phi Beta Kappa. During her time at Yale, Vance volunteered in local elementary schools, served as a Girl Scouts troop leader, and became the editor-in-chief of Our Education, an education policy publication. After graduating, she taught English and American history as a Yale–China Teaching Fellow at Sun Yat-sen University in Guangzhou, China. Vance then attended Clare College, Cambridge, in England, as a Gates Cambridge Scholar, receiving a Master of Philosophy in early modern history in 2010, studying the book trade and development of copyright.

In 2013, Vance obtained her Juris Doctor from Yale Law School, where she was the executive development editor of the Yale Law Journal, managing editor of the Yale Journal of Law & Technology, and an editor of the Yale Law & Policy Review. During her time at Yale Law, she participated in the Supreme Court Advocacy Clinic, the Media Freedom and Information Access Clinic, the Iraqi Refugee Assistance Project, and the Pro Bono Network. Her husband has called her "brilliant" and "way more accomplished than I am".

=== Family background ===
Usha Chilukuri Vance comes from a family of academic scholars and educators. Her parents are Telugu Brahmins from the West Godavari and Krishna districts of Andhra Pradesh, India. Her paternal ancestry can be traced to Chilukuri Buchipapayya Sastri (c. 18th century), who lived in Saipuram in Vuyyuru mandal of Krishna district. A branch of her family later migrated to Vadluru near Tanuku in West Godavari district. Usha's mother, Lakshmi, is from Pamarru in Krishna district. Her great-aunt Chilukuri Santhamma, whom she has never met, resides in Visakhapatnam, Andhra Pradesh, teaches physics at a private university, and has written an English interpretation of the Bhagavad Gita, a Hindu sacred text. Usha's paternal grandfather, Chilukuri Rama Sastri, taught physics at IIT Madras, and the institute now runs a student award in his memory, as endowed by the family specifically Chilukuri Veer Avadhani.

== Career ==
Vance served as a law clerk for Judge Amul Thapar of the District Court for the Eastern District of Kentucky from 2013 to 2014, Judge Brett Kavanaugh on the Court of Appeals for the District of Columbia Circuit from 2014 to 2015, and Chief Justice John Roberts from 2017 to 2018. During her clerkship at the Supreme Court, she was assigned to work on Azar v. Garza, a case regarding a juvenile undocumented immigrant in the custody of U.S. Immigration and Customs Enforcement who sought to have an abortion.

Vance worked for the law firm Munger, Tolles & Olson for its San Francisco and Washington, D.C. offices as an associate for almost six years, handling civil litigation and appeals in cases involving higher education, local government, entertainment and technology, until July 2024, when she resigned "to focus on caring for our family". Among her clients were Paramount Pictures, Regents of the University of California, Pacific Gas and Electric Company, and a division of The Walt Disney Company. Vance previously worked as a summer associate at Williams & Connolly, Taft Stettinius & Hollister, and Levine Sullivan Koch & Schulz. She was admitted to the District of Columbia, California, and Ohio bars.

== Second lady of the United States (2025–present) ==
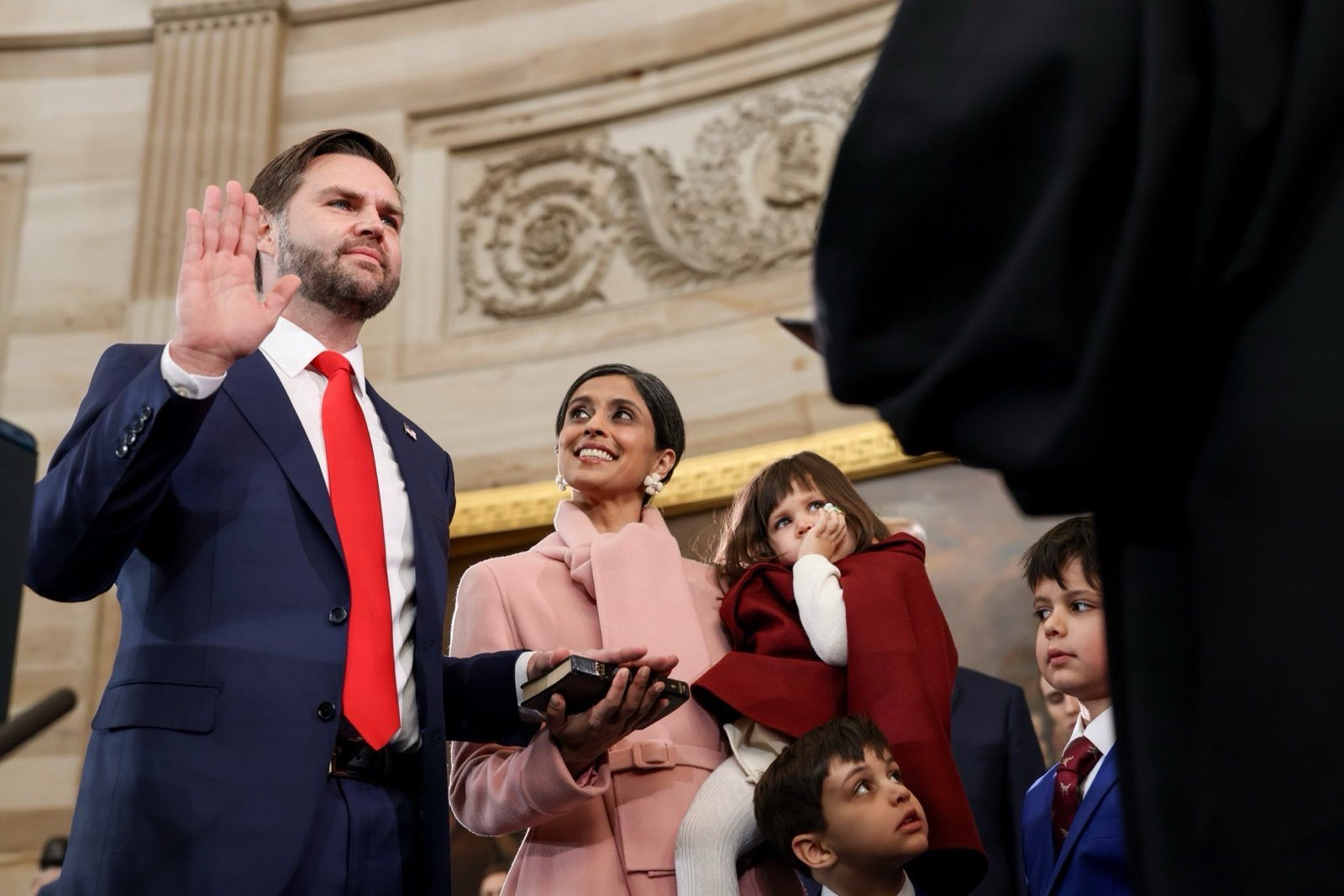
Vance looks on as her husband takes the vice presidential oath of office; January 20, 2025.

At the Republican National Convention in July 2024, Usha Vance delivered the introductory address for her husband, JD Vance. Since then, she has been an advisor to her husband, and often travels with him to campaign events, occasionally appearing onstage with him. According to some sources, she helped her husband prepare for the 2024 vice-presidential debate. JD Vance was declared the winner of the debate by several columnists, including some from The New York Times, The Wall Street Journal, and Los Angeles Times. Usha Vance also received some credit for her husband's debate performance.

In November 2024, as JD Vance became the vice president-elect of the United States, Usha Vance assumed the role of second lady of the United States designate. In January 2025, she became the first Indian American, first Telugu, and first Hindu second lady, while in a broader classification also being the first Asian American in this role.

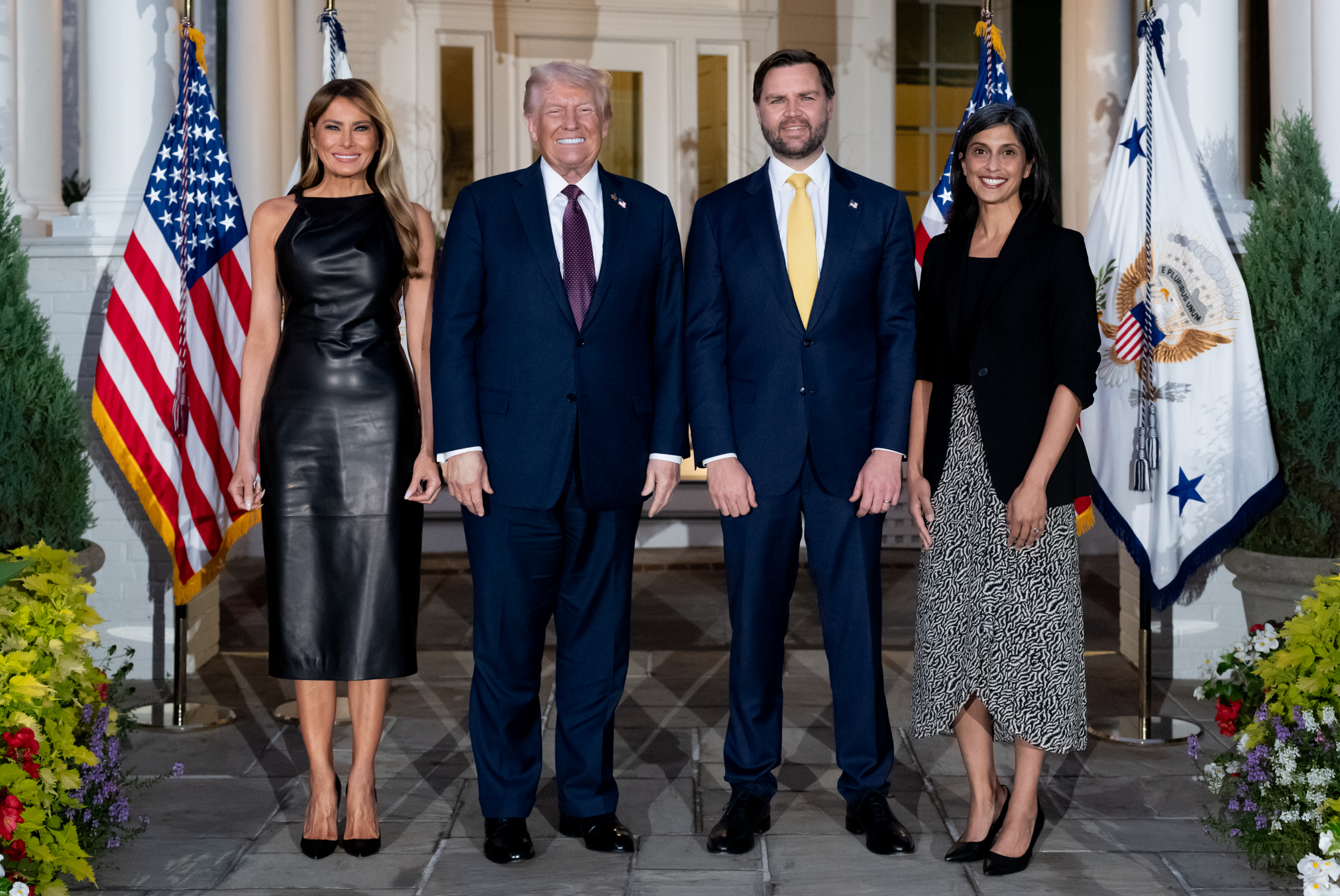
Vance with her husband, President Trump and First lady Melania Trump

Several political analysts have noted that Vance has played a key role in her husband's political career. In February 2025, Vance accompanied her husband on a visit to France and Germany. In the same month, President Trump appointed Usha Vance to serve as a member of the board of trustees of John F. Kennedy Center for the Performing Arts. In March 2025, Vance was selected to lead the United States presidential delegation to Italy for the 2025 Special Olympics World Winter Games.

In March 2025, she went on a visit to Greenland, which caused a diplomatic spat. Prime minister Mute Egede called the visit "a provocation", and said she is not welcome in Greenland, noting that "until recently, we could trust the Americans, who were our allies and friends, and with whom we enjoyed working very closely, but that time is over." The government condemned the visit as "highly aggressive." The Greenland government has accused the United States of foreign interference in its affairs. Usha Vance had been invited by American Daybreak, a group led by Tom Dans, who was an Arctic commissioner in the first Trump administration. In November 2025, Vance made her first joint visit with First Lady Melania Trump at Marine Corps Base Camp Lejeune where they spent time with military members and their families to show appreciation for those who serve during the holiday season. In February 2026, Vance and her husband attended the 2026 Winter Olympics. The two of them then visited Prime Minister Nikol Pashinyan in Armenia, making them the first sitting second lady and U.S. vice president to visit the country.

== Politics ==
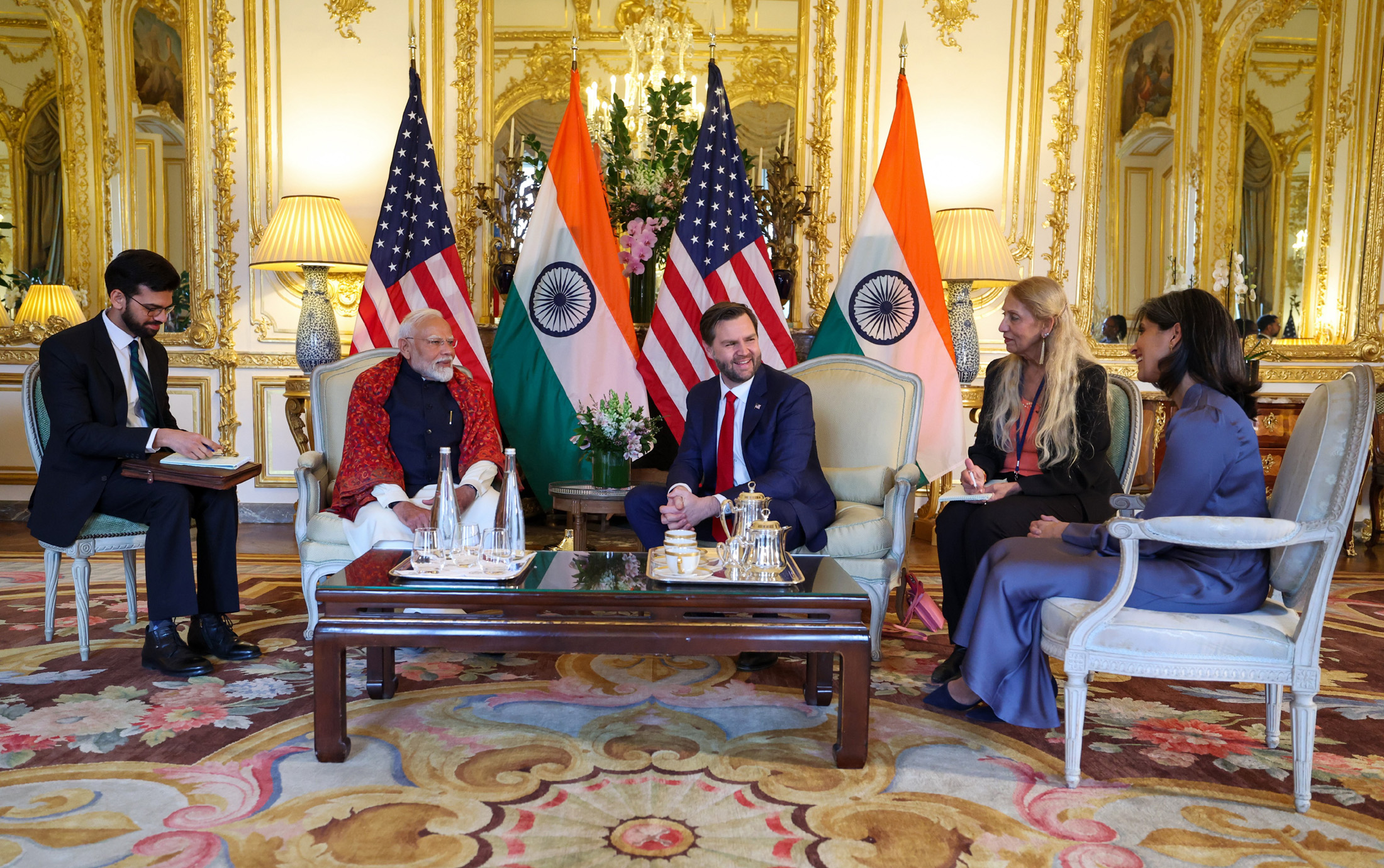
JD and Usha Vance with Indian prime minister Narendra Modi in Paris, France in February 2025

In 2014 Chilukuri voted in the Democratic primaries, but in 2022, she voted in the Republican primary in which her husband was a candidate. She clerked for conservative judges, such as Roberts and Kavanaugh, but has also practiced at a California law firm with a progressive work culture. According to The New York Times, her political views seem to have changed over the years, as in 2021, she made a political contribution to national conservative Blake Masters in his campaign to represent Arizona in the U.S. Senate.

== Public image and style ==
In Hillbilly Elegy (2020), a film about the life of her husband, she was portrayed by actress Freida Pinto.

In July 2024, after Trump chose JD Vance as his running mate, The New York Times reported that Usha Vance "models a new kind of Republican image-making". Newsweek said Vance's fashion choices were "different from that of the typical women in Trump's circle, who take on a Miss America type of look". American fashion media widely praised her fashion choices at the 2025 presidential inauguration.

White supremacists, including prominent far-right figures such as Nick Fuentes and Jaden McNeil, have made racist comments about Vance, targeting her for her Indian heritage. JD Vance defended his wife against what he called "ridiculous" attacks in an interview with ABC News, and he further defended her during an appearance on The Megyn Kelly Show.

== Personal life ==
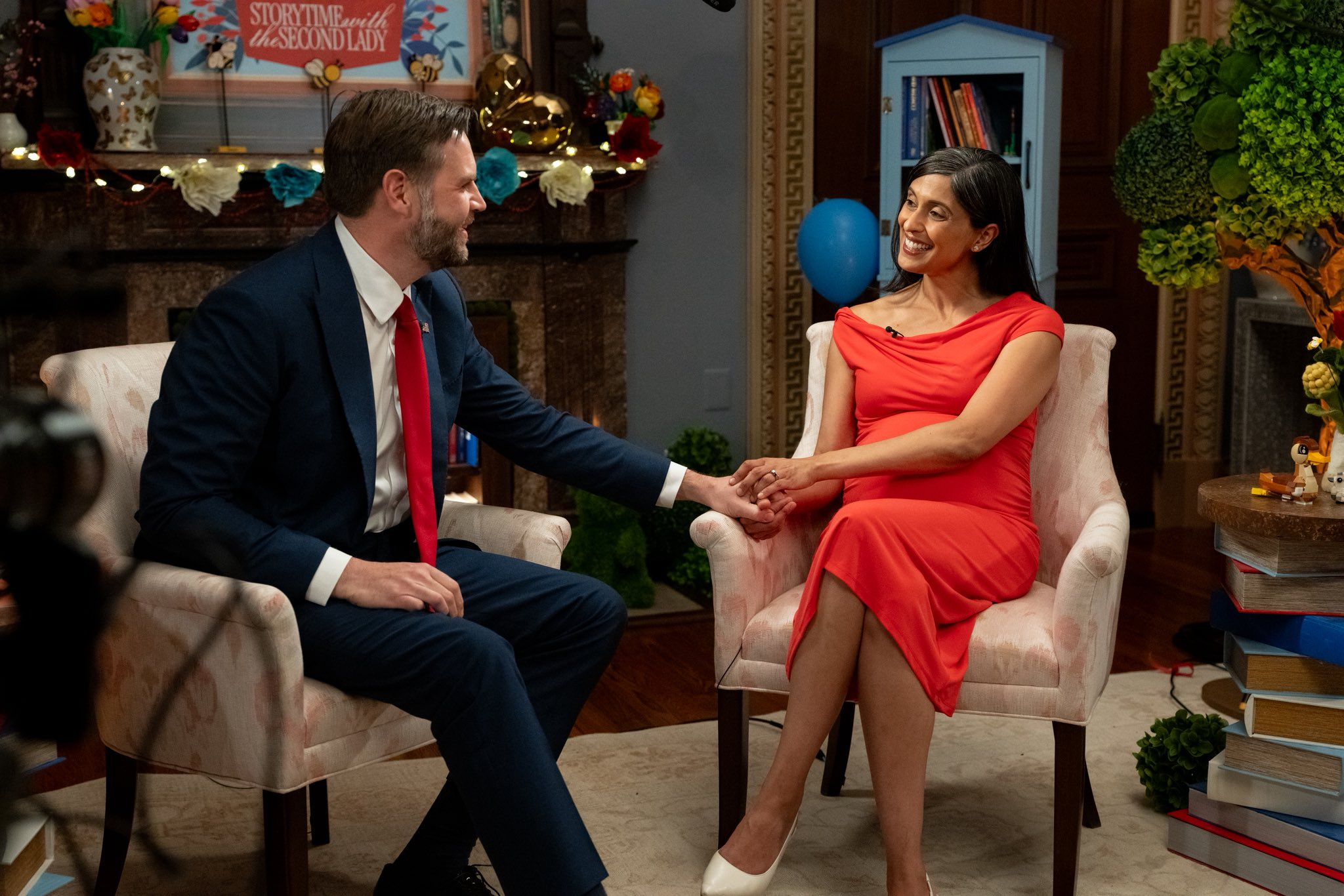
Vance with her husband in June 2026

While at Yale Law School, Usha Chilukuri met her future husband, JD Vance, a relationship encouraged by their professor Amy Chua. Chua has called their relationship "extremely unlikely, almost opposites of personality". In 2013, Chilukuri and Vance collaborated to organize a discussion group at Yale focused on "social decline in white America". Vance often called Chilukuri his "Yale spirit guide".

Chilukuri and Vance married on June 14, 2014, in Kentucky in an interfaith marriage ceremony. Her husband's friend Jamil Jivani read from the Bible and a Hindu pandit blessed the couple. She is a Hindu, while her husband is a Christian who was raised unaffiliated with any particular church, became an atheist in his twenties, and converted to Catholicism in 2019. They have four children, whom they have decided to raise as Christian. Their fourth child was born on July 19, 2026, making her the first sitting second lady to give birth since Ellen Maria Colfax in 1870. (Note: Several sources, including The Hill, incorrectly state that no second lady has been pregnant since Floride Calhoun, who gave birth in 1829. However, Ellen Maria Colfax gave birth while second lady in 1870.)

Vance is a trustee of the Washington National Opera. She has served on the board of the Gates Cambridge Alumni Association and as secretary of the board of the Cincinnati Symphony Orchestra.

== Notes ==
Honorary titles
Preceded by Doug Emhoff as Second Gentleman	Second Lady of the United States; 2025–present	Current holder
