= Hillbilly Elegy (film) =

2020 film by Ron Howard

- Official release poster
- Directed by: Ron Howard
- Screenplay by: Vanessa Taylor
- Based on: Hillbilly Elegy by JD Vance
- Produced by: Brian Grazer; Ron Howard; Karen Lunder
- Starring: Amy Adams; Glenn Close; Gabriel Basso; Haley Bennett; Freida Pinto; Bo Hopkins; Owen Asztalos
- Cinematography: Maryse Alberti
- Edited by: James D. Wilcox
- Music by: Hans Zimmer; David Fleming
- Production company: Imagine Entertainment
- Distributed by: Netflix
- Release dates: November 11, 2020 (United States); November 24, 2020 (Netflix)
- Running time: 115 minutes
- Country: United States
- Language: English
- Budget: $45 million
- Box office: $38,852

Hillbilly Elegy is a 2020 American biographical drama film directed by Ron Howard from a screenplay by Vanessa Taylor, based on the 2016 memoir of the same name by the 50th vice president of the United States JD Vance. The film stars Amy Adams and Glenn Close, with Gabriel Basso, Haley Bennett, Freida Pinto, Bo Hopkins in his final film appearance, and Owen Asztalos starring in supporting roles.

After buying the rights to Vance's book in 2017, Imagine Entertainment announced Howard as the film's director. In January 2019, Netflix acquired the distribution rights, with much of the cast joined in April and filming taking place from June through August in Georgia and Ohio.

Hillbilly Elegy had a limited theatrical release on November 11, 2020, before its streaming release on November 24, by Netflix. The film was negatively reviewed by critics, and received three nominations at the Golden Raspberry Awards: Worst Director, Worst Screenplay, and Worst Supporting Actress (Close). However, the film was also nominated for Best Makeup and Hairstyling and Best Supporting Actress (Close) at the 93rd Academy Awards. Close was also nominated for the Golden Globe and Screen Actors Guild Awards, while Adams's performance earned her a Screen Actors Guild Award nomination for Outstanding Performance by a Female Actor in a Leading Role.

== Plot ==
JD Vance looks back on his childhood in Middletown, Ohio, where he was raised by his mother Beverly "Bev" and her parents from Jackson, Kentucky. In 1997, then 13-year-old JD and his older sister, Lindsay, struggle with their mother's drug addiction and unstable behavior.

After an argument while driving, Bev threatens to crash the car before attacking JD, causing him to flee to a nearby house. After Bev breaks through the door to drag JD away; he lies to keep her from being arrested. Soon afterwards, Bev's father, Papaw, dies. She is later fired for her erratic behavior and for stealing pills during work hours, causing her to have a violent breakdown in front of the entire neighborhood. After a series of boyfriends, Bev marries her new boss but is unable to detox.

JD often spends time with his maternal grandmother, Bonnie "Mamaw" Vance, who struggles to keep her daughter in line. She reluctantly convinces JD to give his mother clean urine for a drug test to keep her job. Mamaw is later hospitalized with pneumonia while JD's grades start to slip as he begins acting out with his new stepbrother and their friends. JD joins them in drinking, drugs, and vandalism, before they crash Mamaw's car. Lindsay informs Mamaw, who discharges herself from the hospital and takes in JD to live with her.

Stern but well-meaning, Mamaw attempts to curb JD's outbursts after he is caught shoplifting a graphing calculator for school, warning JD that someone will need to care for the family when she is gone, and that he has the choice to make something of himself. Realizing how much Mamaw is struggling to support them both, JD finds a job and begins to excel in school, later joining the United States Marine Corps. He returns home when Mamaw dies, before serving in Iraq. After his tour, JD uses the "new GI bill" to attend college.

In 2011, an adult JD (age 27 at this point) works three jobs to put himself through Yale Law School. He hopes to secure a summer internship in Washington, D.C., with his girlfriend Usha, but Lindsay calls him with the news that Bev has overdosed on heroin. Driving home to Middletown, JD struggles to find a rehab facility for his mother, and is offered a last chance for a job interview the following morning. Despite feeling overwhelmed, JD refuses Usha's offer to come and help.

Bev refuses to return to rehab, causing her most recent boyfriend to throw Bev out of his apartment. With Lindsay raising her own family, JD takes Bev to a motel, but discovers her using heroin in the bathroom. Wrestling the needle away from Bev, JD urges her not to give up, and leaves his mother with Lindsay as he departs for New Haven. He calls Usha, who keeps him company on the phone as he drives through the night. Surprising her in the morning, JD arrives in time for his interview.

An epilogue reveals that JD graduated from Yale and published his memoir. He and Usha married and had children, moving to Ohio to be near his family, including Lindsay and Bev, who has been sober for six years.

== Cast ==
- Gabriel Basso as JD Vance
  - Owen Asztalos as young JD
- Amy Adams as Beverly "Bev" Vance, JD's mother
  - Tierney Smith as young Bev
- Glenn Close as Bonnie "Mamaw" Vance, JD's grandmother
  - Sunny Mabrey as young Bonnie
- Haley Bennett as Lindsay Vance, JD's older sister
- Freida Pinto as Usha Vance
- Bo Hopkins as Papaw Vance, JD's grandfather

== Production ==
Imagine Entertainment won the rights to the memoir in an April 2017 auction, and Ron Howard decided to direct the film. In February 2018, Vanessa Taylor was set to adapt the memoir into a screenplay. In March 2018, Ron Howard was spotted at the Buckingham Coal Mine near Corning, Ohio, scouting possible locations in Perry County. In October 2018 and March 2019, Howard was spotted in Middletown, Ohio, again scouting filming locations.

In January 2019, Netflix won the rights to the film after bidding $45 million on the project. Glenn Close, Amy Adams, Gabriel Basso and Haley Bennett joined the cast in April. In June 2019, Freida Pinto, Bo Hopkins and Owen Asztalos were added.

Principal photography began on June 12, 2019, in Atlanta, Georgia, and wrapped up on August 8, 2019, in Middletown, Ohio, after a 43-day shooting schedule. Several days of filming took place in the book's setting of Middletown, Ohio, though much of the filming was done in Atlanta, Clayton, and Macon, Georgia, using the production code-name "IVAN". Hans Zimmer and David Fleming composed the film's music.

By January 2020, the film was in post-production.

== Release ==
Hillbilly Elegy began a limited theatrical release in the United States on November 11, 2020, then streamed on Netflix starting November 24.

It was the most-watched film on the site on its first day of release, before finishing third in its debut weekend.

== Reception and legacy ==
=== Critical response ===
Critical response to Hillbilly Elegy was negative. On Rotten Tomatoes, 24% of 260 critics and 81% of 2,500 audience reviews gave the film a positive review. The website's critics consensus reads, "With the form of an awards-season hopeful but the soul of a bland melodrama, Hillbilly Elegy strands some very fine actors in the not-so-deep South." According to Metacritic, which calculated a weighted average score of 38 out of 100 based on 43 critics, the film received "generally unfavorable" reviews.

Richard Roeper from the Chicago Sun-Times gave the film a 4 out of 4 star rating, praising Adams's and Close's "exceptional work", describing Adams as a "tour de force" and Close as "masterful, screen-commanding, pitch-perfect."

The Independent reported that the film was widely criticized for "perpetuating stereotypes about the poor". Katie Rife of The A.V. Club called it "bootstrapping poverty porn" and said that it "reinforces the stereotypes it's meant to be illuminating."

Owen Gleiberman of Variety wrote, "As long as Close is acting up an award-worthy storm (her performance is actually quite meticulous), Hillbilly Elegy is never less than alive. Amy Adams does some showpiece acting of her own, but as skillful as her performance is, she never gets us to look at Bev with pity and terror." For IndieWire, David Ehrlich gave the film a "C−" and wrote "Hillbilly Elegy hinges on Mamaw's hope that she'll leave her family better off than she found them, and it's clear that Vance's story has fulfilled that wish almost as soon as this movie starts. But the process of watching him cut his losses and recommit to his own success is rendered in a way that it isn't just dramatically unsatisfying in the extreme, but also on the verge of sociopathic."

Peter Travers of Good Morning America thought Close's performance was "sensational", but concluded, "With greater emphasis on simplicity instead of Hollywood showboating, Hillbilly Elegy might have been more than a missed opportunity." In her positive review, Sandra Hall from The Sydney Morning Herald praised Howard's "high-end brand of commercial movie-making" and opined that he's "to be applauded just for inviting Close, with her wealth of imagination and technique, to give us everything she has."

=== Accolades ===
Glenn Close became the third performer in history to be nominated for an Academy Award and a Golden Raspberry Award for the same performance.

Year	Award	Category	Recipient(s)	Result	Ref.
2020	San Francisco International Film Festival	Award for Acting	Glenn Close	Won	
2021	AARP Movies for Grownup Awards	Best Supporting Actress	Glenn Close	Nominated	
2021	AARP Movies for Grownup Awards	Best Intergenerational Film	Hillbilly Elegy	Nominated	
2021	Academy Awards	Best Supporting Actress	Glenn Close	Nominated	
2021	Academy Awards	Best Makeup and Hairstyling	Eryn Krueger Mekash, Patricia Dehaney and Matthew W. Mungle	Nominated	
2021	Artios Awards	Feature Big Budget – Drama	Carmen Cuba, Tara Feldstein Bennett, Chase Paris, D. Lynn Meyers and Judith Sunga	Nominated	
2021	British Academy Film Awards	Best Makeup and Hair	Eryn Krueger Mekash, Patricia Dehaney and Matthew Mungle	Nominated	
2021	Critics' Choice Awards	Best Supporting Actress	Glenn Close	Nominated	
2021	Critics' Choice Awards	Best Hair & Makeup	Eryn Krueger Mekash, Patricia Dehaney and Matthew Mungle	Nominated	
2021	Detroit Film Critics Society Awards	Best Supporting Actress	Glenn Close	Nominated	
2021	Gold Derby Awards	Supporting Actress	Glenn Close	Nominated	
2021	Gold Derby Awards	Makeup/Hair	Eryn Krueger Mekash, Patricia Dehaney and Matthew Mungle	Nominated	
2021	Golden Globe Awards	Best Supporting Actress – Motion Picture	Glenn Close	Nominated	
2021	Golden Raspberry Awards	Worst Director	Ron Howard	Nominated	
2021	Golden Raspberry Awards	Worst Supporting Actress	Glenn Close	Nominated	
2021	Golden Raspberry Awards	Worst Screenplay	Vanessa Taylor; Based on the memoir by JD Vance	Nominated	
2021	Hollywood Critics Association Awards	Best Supporting Actress	Glenn Close	Nominated	
2021	Hollywood Critics Association Awards	Best Hair & Makeup	Eryn Krueger Mekash, Patricia Dehaney and Matthew Mungle	Nominated	
2021	Make-Up Artists and Hair Stylists Guild Awards	Best Period and/or Character Make-Up in a Feature-Length Motion Picture	Eryn Krueger Mekash, Jamie Hess, Devin Morales and Jessica Gambardella	Nominated	
2021	Make-Up Artists and Hair Stylists Guild Awards	Best Period and/or Character Hair Styling in a Feature-Length Motion Picture	Patricia Dehaney, Tony Ward, Martial Corneville and Stacey Butterworth	Nominated	
2021	Make-Up Artists and Hair Stylists Guild Awards	Best Special Make-Up Effects in a Feature-Length Motion Picture	Eryn Krueger Mekash, Matthew Mungle and Jamie Hess	Nominated	
2021	Screen Actors Guild Awards	Outstanding Performance by a Female Actor in a Leading Role	Amy Adams	Nominated	
2021	Screen Actors Guild Awards	Outstanding Performance by a Female Actor in a Supporting Role	Glenn Close	Nominated	
2021	Set Decorators Society of America Awards	Best Achievement in Décor/Design of a Contemporary Feature Film	Merissa Lombardo and Molly Hughes	Nominated	

=== Post-release ===
In September 2024, the film's director, Ron Howard, expressed disappointment and "surprise" over JD Vance's rhetoric and role as the 2024 United States vice presidential candidate for the Republican ticket, saying "we didn't talk a lot of politics when we were making the movie because I was interested in Vance's upbringing and that survival tale. That's what we mostly focused on. However, based on the conversations that we had during that time, I just have to say I'm very surprised and disappointed by much of the rhetoric that I'm reading and hearing. People do change, and I assume that's the case. When we spoke around the time that I knew him, he was not involved in politics or claimed to be particularly interested."

Following Donald Trump's announcement that JD Vance would be his running mate, viewership of Hillbilly Elegy surged by 1,179% compared to the previous day.
