= Kudumbam =

Kudumbam (lit. 'Family') may refer to these Indian films:

- Kudumbam (1954 film), a Tamil-language film directed by Jampana
- Kudumbam (1967 film), a Malayalam-language film directed by M. Krishnan Nair
- Kudumbam (1984 film), a Tamil-language film directed by S. A. Chandrasekhar

== See also ==
- Kutumbam (disambiguation)
