= Sixth College =

College at the University of California, San Diego

- University of California, San Diego
- Logo introduced in June 2025
- Coordinates: 32.8804748°N 117.2421702°W
- Motto: Cultivating curious minds to tackle the complex challenges of our times
- Established: 2001 (Sixth)
- Former names: Conan O'Brien College
- Status: Undergraduate, liberal arts
- Colors: Sixth Teal
- Provost: Lakshmi Chilukuri
- Deans: Dean of students Diane LeGree Dean of academics Christine Fraser Resident dean Anthony Jakubisin
- Undergraduates: 4,262
- Core course: Culture, Art, and Technology (CAT)
- Major events: Festival: Chocolate Festival, Kuncocshun, Spirit of the Masters
- Residential Area: North Torrey Pines Living & Learning Neighborhood (as of Fall 2020)
- Website: sixth.ucsd.edu

Sixth College is an undergraduate residential college at the University of California, San Diego. The college was established in September 2001.

== Name ==
Sixth College is named after the order of the college because it is the sixth undergraduate college at UC San Diego. As per university tradition, it uses a numerical name until it gets a proper name. In 2005, the name "Richard Atkinson College" was considered, to be named after Richard C. Atkinson. Atkinson is a professor Emeritus of Cognitive Science, former chancellor of UC San Diego, and former President of the University of California. However, he withdrew his name from consideration. The College was briefly named Conan O'Brien College for one day on April 20, 2012 to commemorate their tenth anniversary.

== Ethos and philosophy ==
=== Experiential learning ===
Beginning in 2012, Sixth College has hosted the biannual Experiential Learning Conference. Sixth College is also the only college at UC San Diego with an explicit upper division Practicum requirement which can be satisfied by many different types of experiential learning opportunities including: study abroad programs, study at UCDC, various types of service-learning in the community, directed research with faculty members, internship programs, and specially designed independent study programs.

== Student life ==
The student council at Sixth College is known as SCSC. This Sixth College Student Council heads the many committees that are responsible for many major Sixth events in the academic year. These include Spirit of the Masters (Arts Committee), CHAOS (Culture Committee), Kuncocshun (Festival Committee), Winter Game Fest (Tech Committee), and Spirit Night (Spirit Committee). The SCSC also has positions for members of the Sixth College Judicial Board.

Other student organizations include Action Vibe, Community Board (Co-Board), Sixth College Television (SCTV), The Sixth Sense (an investigative journal), Sixer Tritons and Recreation for Transfers (START), and Video Production Club (VPC). Sixth College also has an ambassador program, for students who strive to increase Sixth College students' sense of belonging and connectedness to the community.

=== Academic buildings, on-campus housing, and other facilities ===
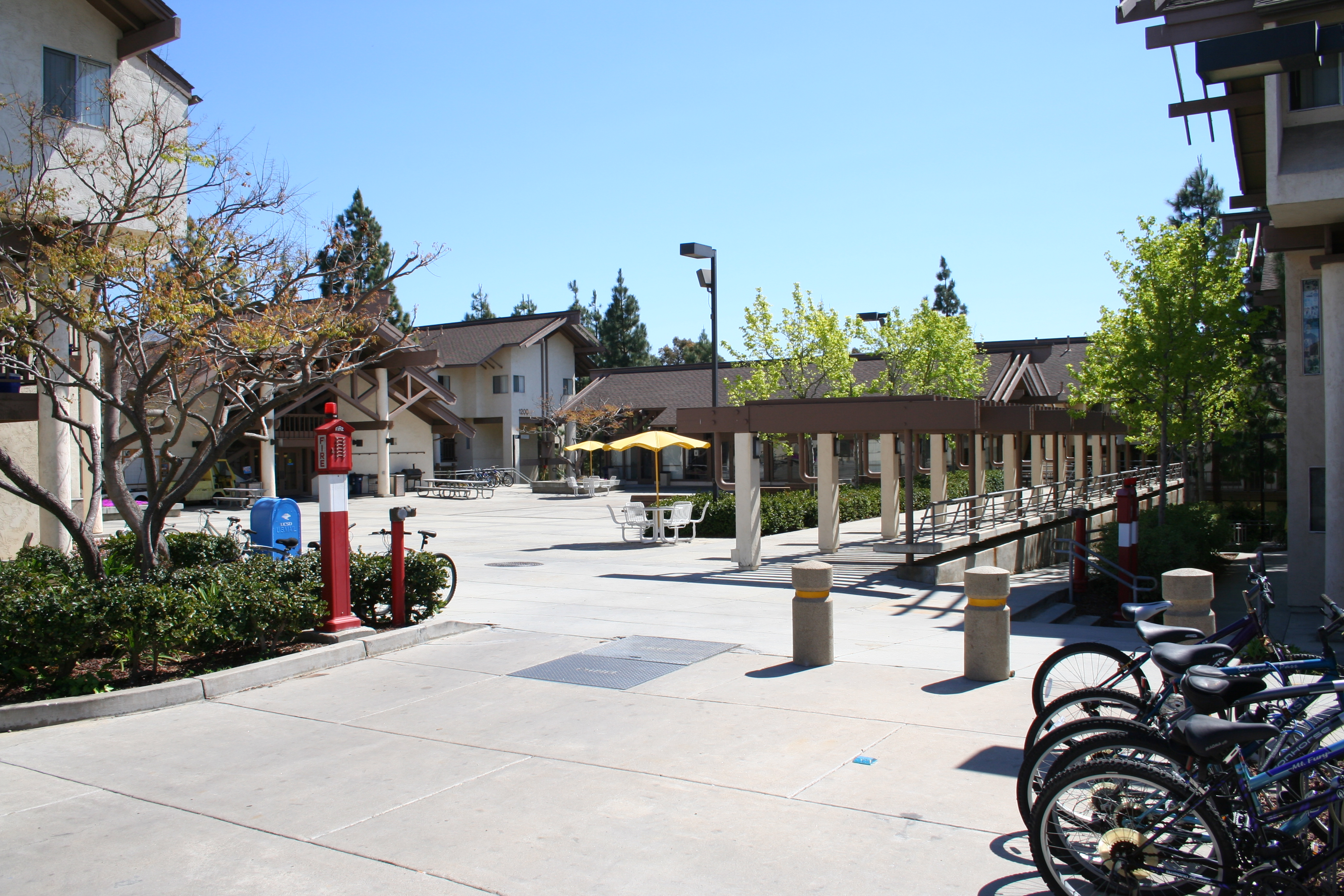
The courtyard of the old Sixth Apartments, now Pepper Canyon Apartments.

On-campus housing is available at Sixth College for two years. The original Sixth College dormitories are located near Pepper Canyon Hall, and are now used for transfer student housing. These dorms are nicknamed "Camp Snoopy" as the trees, central lawn, and cabin-like dormitory buildings all contribute to the appearance of a youth summer camp. The dorms are arranged in multiple two-story buildings, with approximately sixty students per building (thirty per floor). Each floor is further divided into two suites, each consisting of five rooms and a common room. A shared bathroom connects the two suites. Each building also features a kitchen and study room for use by residents of that building.

The other former on-campus housing option are the old Sixth's apartments (sometimes referred to by their old name from when they were part of Fifth College, "Pepper Canyon Apartments").

Slight variations of the old Sixth College logo were in use from 2001 until a major redesign in 2025.

Sixth College has been moved twice within UC San Diego's Campus since its establishment in September 2001, first to the Pepper Canyon area and Camp Snoopy (where some remnants like the street naming, e.g. Sixth Ln, still exist) (Camp Snoopy has since been demolished after Sixth's move to NTPLLN, but Pepper Canyon East and Matthews Apartments are now serving transfer students before their eventual replacement). Finally, in 2020, the college transitioned to then-newly opened facilities in a different part of campus, the North Torrey Pines Living and Learning Neighborhood (NTPLLN) (which has been planned to be the eventual home of Sixth College since before its construction), built on former parking lots (Muir Parking Lots P207 and P208, which closed permanently on June 18, 2018 to allow for its construction), on Ridge Walk (overlooking the coast) immediately north of Muir College. The transition process was staggered due to the COVID-19 pandemic, with some students living in the completed facilities, and the remaining buildings were expected to finish construction later than expected, by 2020 or early 2021.

The North Toreey Pines Living & Learning Neighborhood hosts a number of Living-Learning Communities (LLCs). For fall Quarter 2025, this includes the Multicultural Living-Learning Community for students of various backgrounds (mainly students of color) and the African Black Diaspora LLC for students of African descent, which is open for any student with a housing contract to apply for (during their housing application) and allows non-Sixth College and transfer students, who typically live in specific transfer housing areas rather than and regardless of their assigned colleges of registration, to select a room in Sixth to participate in these programs, which offer some light extra programming and activities related to their theme, if their applications are selected. Additionally, Sixth College also currently hosts Gender Inclusive Housing, which is open for all students at UC San Diego to opt-into on their housing application/forms on the campus-wide HDH housing portal, as well as the OASIS LLC designed specifically for first-generation college students from under-served high schools who are already participating in the OASIS Program, including OASIS Summer Bridge, to live together in order to continue building their supportive relationships from earlier in the program and receive support and advice from each other as well as student staff (e.g. the RA in charge of the OASIS LLC program/floor(s)).

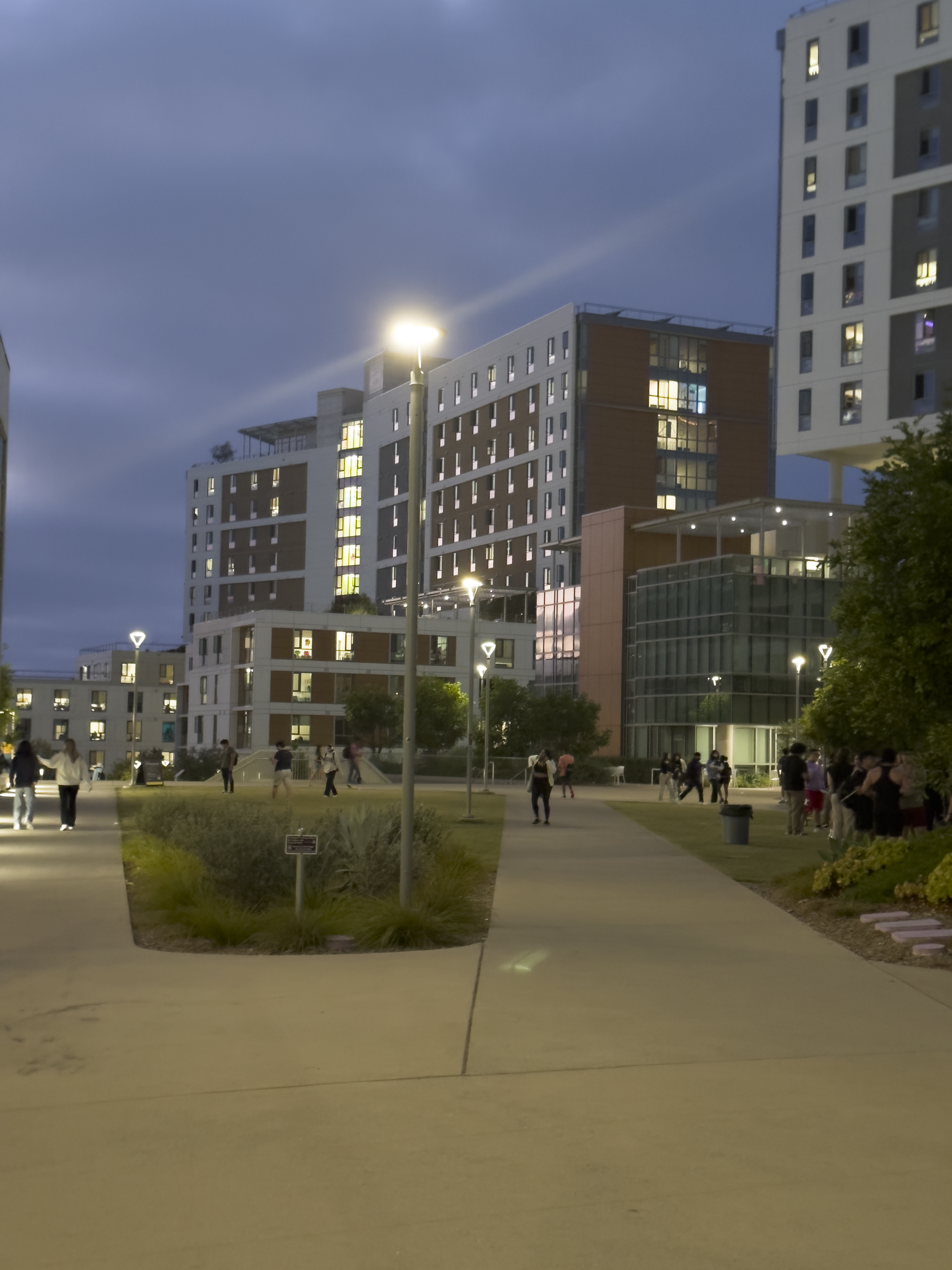
An image of the Kaleidoscope building at the North Torrey Pines living & learning community, the new residence halls of Sixth College.

=== Commuter life ===
Sixth College has several resources for commuters. Sixth College commuter students have unlimited access to the Commuter Center located in Pepper Canyon Hall, which features lockers, WiFi, and kitchen facilities. Sixth College also has a commuter student organization known as Commuters in Action, or CIA. Each quarter, Sixth College also hosts Commuter and Transfer social events.

== Notable events ==
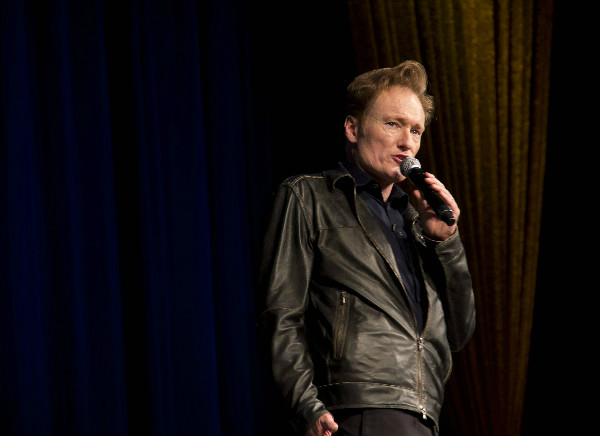
Conan O'Brien during his visit to Sixth College in 2012.

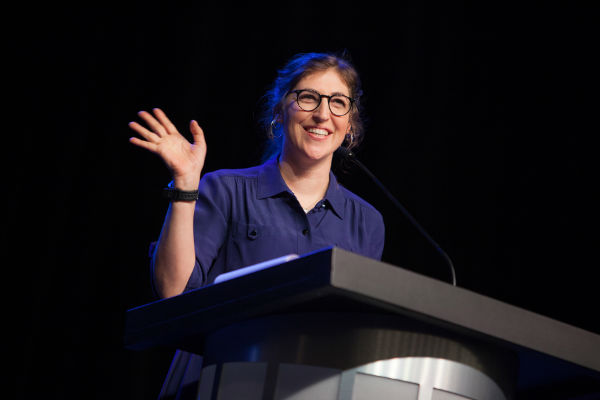
Mayim Bialik during her visit to Sixth College in 2015.

On April 20, 2012, late-night talk show host Conan O'Brien visited Sixth College in honor of its tenth anniversary. To celebrate the occasion, and in the absence of a permanent name, Sixth College renamed itself to Conan O'Brien College for the day of April 20.

On May 27, 2015, actress Mayim Bialik visited Sixth College in honor of its thirteenth anniversary.

=== Experiential Learning Conference ===
The Experiential Learning Conference is a biannual event occurring in early Winter quarter (late January), and is free and open to the public. The first conference was organizers by former acting Provost Jim Lin and Director Diane Forbes Berthoud, and hosted jointly by Sixth College and Warren College on January 26, 2012, in the Cross Cultural Center located in Price Center East. The theme of the inaugural conference was Education in Action: Mobilizing the next generation for social reform. Over 165 presenters participated in panels, with representation from multiple universities in San Diego and across the UC Community. Notable presenters included David Kirsh and Lev Manovich.

The second conference was sponsored by Provost Dan Donoghue, organized by Director Diane Forbes Berthoud, and hosted by Sixth College. The event was held in Price Center West as well as the Cross Cultural Center on Friday, January 31, 2014.

The keynote speaker was Mizuko Ito, who gave a special noon session talk on 'Connected Learning.' Other notable presenters included Associate Vice Chancellor Barbara Sawrey, Michael Trigilio, STEM and STEAM programming, Elizabeth Losh, K. Wayne Yang, Teddy Cruz, Bud Mehan, Michael Cole, Ashley Trinh, and Mirle Bussell.

The third conference was sponsored by Provost Dan Donoghue, organized by Director Diane Forbes Berthoud, and hosted by Sixth College. The event was held in the Cross Cultural Center on Thursday, March 31, 2016.

=== Commencement ===
UC San Diego hosts separate graduation ceremonies for each undergraduate college. Sixth College has had such commencement speakers as:

- Sev Ohanian, '08 Sixth alum, co-writer/producer of Searching
- Wesley Chan, '06 Sixth alum, member of Wong Fu Productions
- Kim Stanley Robinson, science fiction writer
- Naomi Oreskes, history professor and co-author of Merchants of Doubt
