= Turlapaty Kutumba Rao =

Indian writer (1933–2021)

- Born: August 10, 1933; Vijayawada, Andhra Pradesh, India
- Died: 11 January 2021 (aged 87); Vijayawada, India
- Occupations: Journalist, Orator
- Children: Jawahar Lal
- Awards: Padma Shri; Pratibha Puraskar; Kalaprapoorna title Guardian of Telugu; International Man of the Year; World Lifetime Achievement Award; National Citizen Award; President's Gold Medal

Turlapaty Kutumba Rao (August 10, 1933 – 11 January 2021) was an Indian journalist and orator, known for his service to journalism in Telugu language. He is reported to have written over 4000 biographies and delivered over 16000 public speeches which has been recorded by the Telugu Book of Records as a world record.

== Biography ==
Kutumba Rao was born in 1933 at Vijayawada in the South Indian state of Andhra Pradesh. He was a secretary to T. Prakasham, former Chief Minister of the state and was known to have mooted the idea of demarcating states on the basis of language in 1947, when India became independent. He was also a chairman of the Andhra Pradesh Grandhayala Parishad, a policy making body of the Government of Andhra Pradesh. The journey of his life is recorded in his autobiography, Naa Kalam - Naa Galam, released in 2012.

He was a recipient of the Pratibha Puraskar from the Telugu University, Kalaprapoorna title from Andhra University and the title of Guardian of Telugu from C. Rajagopalachari, then Governor of Andhra Pradesh. Rao received the President's Gold Medal. He was honored by the Government of India, in 2002, with the fourth highest Indian civilian award of Padma Shri making him the first journalist from the state of Andhra Pradesh to receive the award. He was also a nominee for Padma Bhushan for the year 2014.
