= Lakshmi Chilukuri =

Indian-American microbiologist and academic administrator (born 1961)

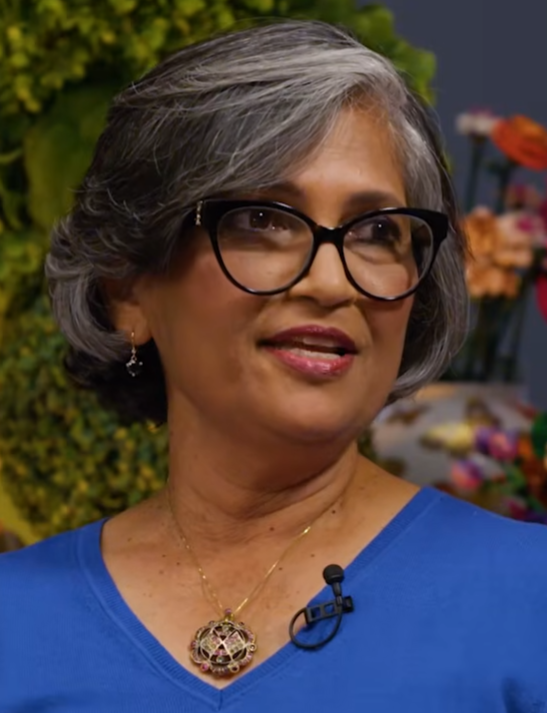
- Chilukuri in 2026

Provost of Sixth College
- Incumbent
- Assumed office July 1, 2018
- Preceded by: Ann Craig

Personal details
- Born: Lakshmi N. Yechuri; 1961 (age 64–65) Hyderabad, India
- Citizenship: American
- Spouse: Radhakrishna "Krish" Chilukuri
- Children: 2, including Usha
- Relatives: JD Vance (son-in-law)
- Scientific career
- Education: University of Madras (BSc, MSc); University of California, San Diego (MS, PhD)
- Fields: Microbiology
- Workplaces: University of California, San Diego
- Thesis: The effect of pressure on DNA-binding proteins from piezosensitive and piezophilic bacteria (1998)
- Doctoral advisors: Douglas H. Bartlett; P.A. George Fortes

Lakshmi N. Chilukuri (née Yechuri; born 1961) is an Indian-American microbiologist, educator, and academic administrator. She is the Provost of Sixth College and a Teaching Professor in the Division of Biological Sciences at the University of California, San Diego. Chilukuri is recognized for her contributions to undergraduate biology education, her leadership in diversity, equity, and inclusion (DEI) initiatives, and her curriculum development. Her son-in-law is Vice President JD Vance.

== Early life and education ==
Chilukuri was born in India and migrated to the United States in the 1980s. She pursued advanced degrees in the biological sciences after moving to the U.S. Her family traces its roots to the state of Andhra Pradesh in India, and maintains ties to their cultural heritage.

She obtained her doctorate degree in Marine Biology in 1998 from the University of California, San Diego, while working under the supervision of Douglas H. Bartlett and P.A. George Fortes at the Scripps Institution of Oceanography.

== Academic career ==
After receiving her doctorate, Chilukuri has been a faculty member at UC San Diego for several decades, joining the Division of Biological Sciences and rising through the ranks to become Provost of Sixth College in 2018. As Provost, she oversees academic and student life for Sixth College, one of the university’s undergraduate colleges.

She is also a Teaching Professor in the Department of Molecular Biology, where she coordinates the undergraduate microbiology teaching laboratory and develops curriculum for laboratory courses. Her teaching emphasizes evidence-based instruction, critical and analytical thinking, and the development of quantitative reasoning skills.

Chilukuri has published peer-reviewed research in molecular biology and science education, including studies on protein synthesis and laboratory pedagogy.

=== Stance on Diversity, Equity, and Inclusion ===
Chilukuri is widely recognized for her leadership in advancing DEI initiatives at UC San Diego. She was a founding member of the Division of Biological Sciences Diversity Committee and played a central role in developing a pioneering course, "Exploring Issues of Diversity, Equity, and Inclusion in Relation to Human Biology" (BILD 60). This course examines race, ethnicity, and gender in biology and medicine, exploring the historical and contemporary intersections of science and social policy from a multicultural perspective.

Chilukuri has mentored first-generation and underrepresented students, serving as a Marshall Mentor (2008–2010), and has publicly advocated for equity and inclusion in higher education. In communications to students, she has emphasized the responsibility of the academic community to address systemic racism and promote an inclusive environment.

== Recognition and impact ==
Chilukuri has been described by UC San Diego Chancellor Pradeep K. Khosla as a "creative and dynamic educator" with a demonstrated record of commitment to undergraduate education, equity, and diversity. Her teaching methods and curricular leadership have been credited with improving student success and fostering a culture of inclusiveness.

Former students and colleagues have noted her ability to connect with students from diverse backgrounds and her lasting impact as a mentor and educator.

== Personal life ==
Lakshmi Chilukuri is married to Dr. Radhakrishna "Krish" Chilukuri, a professor of aerospace engineering at San Diego State University. They have two daughters, Shreya Chilukuri, an engineer, and Usha Chilukuri Vance, an attorney and the Second Lady of the United States, married to Vice President JD Vance.

== See also ==
- Family of JD Vance

== Selected publications ==
- Chilukuri, Lakshmi N.; Fortes, P.A.George; Bartlett, Douglas H. (1997). "High Pressure Modulation of Escherichia coli DNA Gyrase Activity". Biochemical and Biophysical Research Communications. 239 (2): 552–556. Bibcode:1997BBRC..239..552C. doi:10.1006/bbrc.1997.7503. PMID 9344868.
- Chilukuri, Lakshmi N.; Bartlett, Douglas H. (1997). "Isolation and characterization of the gene encoding single-stranded-DNA-binding protein (SSB) from four marine Shewanella strains that differ in their temperature and pressure optima for growth". Microbiology. 143 (4): 1163–1174. doi:10.1099/00221287-143-4-1163. PMID 9141679.
- Chilukuri, Lakshmi (2013). "The Benefits of Peer Instruction and Collaborative Study in Acquisition of Data Analysis Skills". Tested Studies for Laboratory Teaching. 34. Association for Biology Laboratory Education: 436–438.
