= Telugu names =

Naming convention

Telugu names refer to the naming conventions used by Telugu people, primarily from the Indian states of Andhra Pradesh, Telangana, and the Yanam district of Puducherry. Traditional Telugu names use the Eastern name order.

== Naming structure ==
The Telugu naming structure follows Eastern name order, placing the family name (or iṇṭipēru, lit. 'house name') first, followed by the given name. This order contrasts with Western naming practices, which typically place the family name last. This can sometimes lead to confusion outside the Telugu-speaking regions.

=== Family names ===
Telugu family names are often derived from a place, occupation, or historical event associated with the family. Examples include Kondaveeti (from Kondaveedu), and Kandukuri (from Kandukuru). Family names may also end with suffixes such as wada, palli (village), veedhi (street), or giri (hill). Additionally, family names may indicate a profession, such as Vungrala ("ring maker") or Gurram ("horse"), or signify wealth, as with Kasu ("coin"), potentially referring to jewellers. Unlike in Western cultures, where family names are prominent, Telugu people are often better known by their given names.

Telugu family names are frequently abbreviated. For instance, the former Prime Minister of India P. V. Narasimha Rao is commonly referred to by the initials of his family name and given names.

=== Given names ===
Telugu given names often reflect cultural and religious significance, with many derived from Hindu deities. Given names are sometimes compound words; in such cases, only the final word before the caste suffix is used in everyday address. For example, in the name "Venkata Satyanarayana Naidu", "Satyanarayana" would be used informally.

=== Caste suffixes ===
Occasionally, a caste suffix, such as Naidu, Sastri, Rao, Chowdary, Raju, Varma, Reddy, Yadav, Goud, Setty, or Gupta, follows the given name. In the name Devula Rama Naidu, "Devula" is the family name, "Rama" the given name, and "Naidu" the caste suffix.

== Cultural and linguistic parallels ==
The Telugu convention of placing the family name first shares similarities with the naming systems of other cultures, such as Koreans, Japanese, Chinese, and Hungarians.
