= List of accolades received by The Social Network =

The Social Network accolades
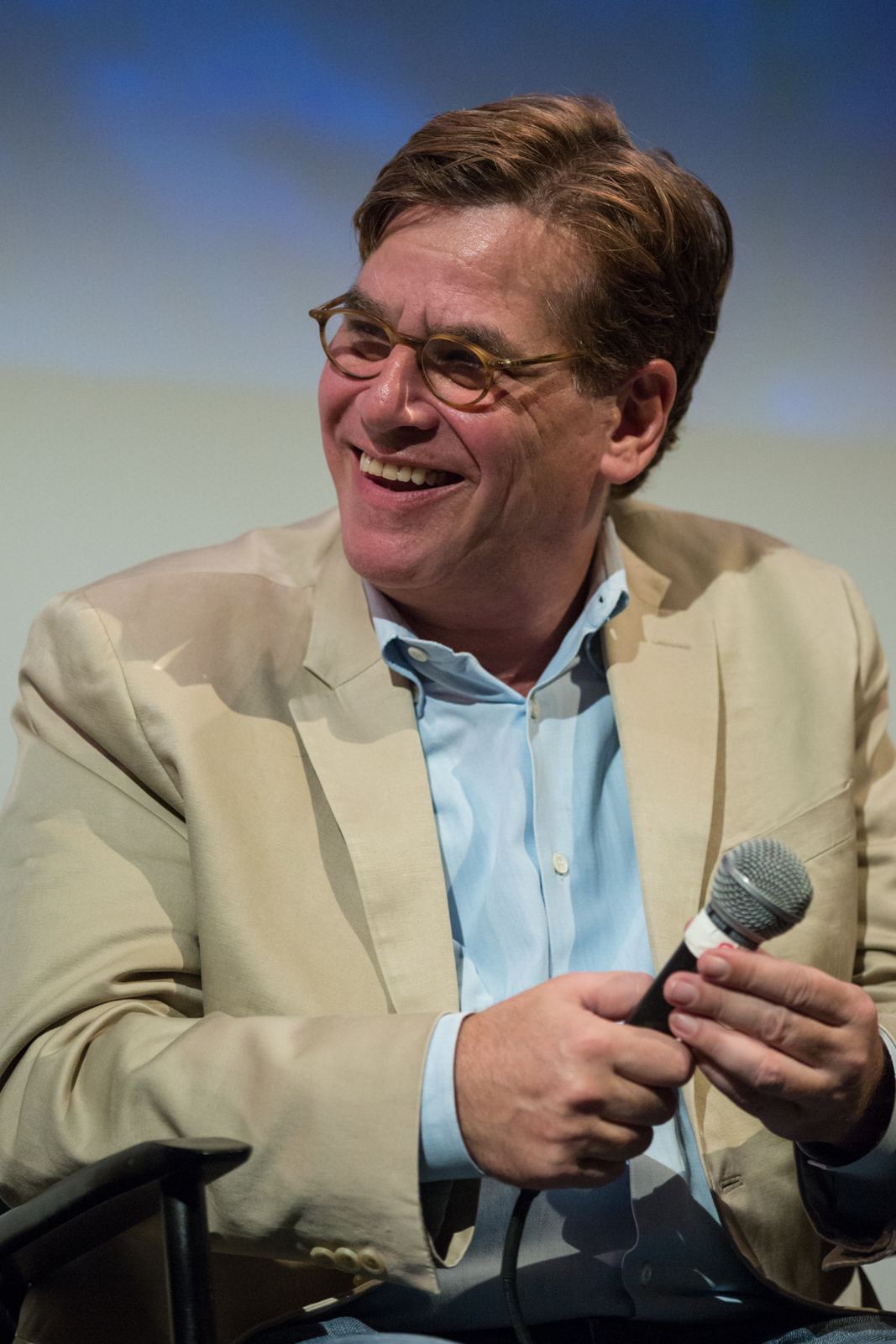
- Aaron Sorkin received many accolades for writing the film, including the Academy Award for Best Adapted Screenplay.
Awards and nominations
Award	Wins	Nominations
Académie des Arts et Techniques du Cinéma	1	1
Academy Awards	3	8
Alliance of Women Film Journalists	4	8
American Film Institute	1	1
British Academy Film Awards	3	7
Hollywood Film Festival	1	1
Golden Globe Awards	4	6
Satellite Awards	3	7
National Board of Review	4	4
People's Choice Awards	0	1
USC Scripter Award	1	1
World Soundtrack Awards	1	1
American Cinema Editors	1	1
American Society of Cinematographers Awards	0	1
ADG Excellence in Production Design Awards	0	1
Cinema Audio Society Awards	0	1
Costume Designers Guild Awards	0	1
Directors Guild of America Awards	0	1
Motion Picture Sound Editors	1	2
Producers Guild of America Awards	0	1
Screen Actors Guild Awards	0	2
Writers Guild of America Awards	1	1
African-American Film Critics Association	2	2
Austin Film Critics Association	2	2
Boston Society of Film Critics	5	6
Critic's Choice Movie Awards	4	9
Chicago Film Critics Association	3	8
Dallas-Fort Worth Film Critics Association	3	3
Detroit Film Critics Society	1	5
Florida Film Critics Circle	3	3
Houston Film Critics Society	4	6
London Evening Standard	1	1
London Film Critics' Circle	4	5
Los Angeles Film Critics Association	4	4
National Society of Film Critics	4	4
New York Film Critics Circle	2	2
New York Film Critics Online	3	3
Online Film Critics Society	3	6
San Diego Film Critics Society	1	7
San Francisco Film Critics Circle	3	3
St. Louis Gateway Film Critics Association	4	5
Toronto Film Critics Association	5	5
Vancouver Film Critics Circle	3	4
Washington D.C. Area Film Critics Association	3	8

Totals (Note: Certain award groups do not simply award one winner. They acknowledge several different recipients, have runners-up, and have third place. Since this is a specific recognition and is different from losing an award, runner-up mentions are considered wins in this award tally. For simplification and to avoid errors, each award in this list has been presumed to have had a prior nomination.)
- Wins: 94
- Nominations: 158

The Social Network is a 2010 American biographical drama film directed by David Fincher and written by Aaron Sorkin, based on the 2009 book The Accidental Billionaires by Ben Mezrich. The film portrays the founding of social networking website Facebook. It stars Jesse Eisenberg as Facebook founder Mark Zuckerberg, with Andrew Garfield as Eduardo Saverin, Justin Timberlake as Sean Parker, Armie Hammer as Cameron and Tyler Winklevoss, and Max Minghella as Divya Narendra. Neither Zuckerberg nor any other Facebook staff were involved with the project, although Saverin was a consultant for Mezrich's book.

The Social Network premiered at the New York Film Festival on September 24, 2010. Produced on a budget of $40 million, the film grossed $224 million worldwide during its original theatrical run. On the review aggregator website Rotten Tomatoes, the film holds an approval rating of 96% based on 334 reviews. It is considered one of the best films of 2010, and of the decade. (Note: Attributed to multiple references:)

== Awards and nominations ==
=== Organizations ===
Awards
Ceremony	Award	Category	Recipient(s)	Result
Académie des Arts et Techniques du Cinéma	César Awards	Best Foreign Film		Won
Academy of Motion Picture Arts and Sciences	Academy Award	Best Picture	Dana Brunetti, Ceán Chaffin, Michael De Luca and Scott Rudin	Nominated
Academy of Motion Picture Arts and Sciences	Academy Award	Best Director	David Fincher	Nominated
Academy of Motion Picture Arts and Sciences	Academy Award	Best Actor	Jesse Eisenberg	Nominated
Academy of Motion Picture Arts and Sciences	Academy Award	Best Adapted Screenplay	Aaron Sorkin	Won
Academy of Motion Picture Arts and Sciences	Academy Award	Best Cinematography	Jeff Cronenweth	Nominated
Academy of Motion Picture Arts and Sciences	Academy Award	Best Film Editing	Angus Wall and Kirk Baxter	Won
Academy of Motion Picture Arts and Sciences	Academy Award	Best Original Score	Trent Reznor and Atticus Ross	Won
Academy of Motion Picture Arts and Sciences	Academy Award	Best Sound Mixing	Ren Klyce, David Parker, Michael Semanick and Mark Weingarten	Nominated
Alliance of Women Film Journalists	EDA Award	Best Film		Won
Alliance of Women Film Journalists	EDA Award	Best Director	David Fincher	Won
Alliance of Women Film Journalists	EDA Award	Best Actor	Jesse Eisenberg	Nominated
Alliance of Women Film Journalists	EDA Award	Best Adapted Screenplay	Aaron Sorkin	Won
Alliance of Women Film Journalists	EDA Award	Best Cinematography	Jeff Cronenweth	Nominated
Alliance of Women Film Journalists	EDA Award	Best Editing	Kirk Baxter and Angus Wall	Nominated
Alliance of Women Film Journalists	EDA Award	Best Music in a Film	Trent Reznor and Atticus Ross	Won
Alliance of Women Film Journalists	EDA Award	Best Ensemble Cast		Nominated
American Film Institute	AFI Awards	Movies of the Year (1 of 10 listed)		Won
British Academy of Film and Television Arts	British Academy Film Awards	Best Film		Nominated
British Academy of Film and Television Arts	British Academy Film Awards	Best Direction	David Fincher	Won
British Academy of Film and Television Arts	British Academy Film Awards	Best Actor	Jesse Eisenberg	Nominated
British Academy of Film and Television Arts	British Academy Film Awards	Best Supporting Actor	Andrew Garfield	Nominated
British Academy of Film and Television Arts	British Academy Film Awards	Best Adapted Screenplay	Aaron Sorkin	Won
British Academy of Film and Television Arts	British Academy Film Awards	Best Editing	Kirk Baxter and Angus Wall	Won
British Academy of Film and Television Arts	British Academy Film Awards	Rising Star Award	Andrew Garfield	Nominated
Hollywood Film Festival	Hollywood Film Award	Ensemble of the Year		Won
Hollywood Foreign Press	Golden Globe Award	Best Motion Picture – Drama		Won
Hollywood Foreign Press	Golden Globe Award	Best Director	David Fincher	Won
Hollywood Foreign Press	Golden Globe Award	Best Screenplay	Aaron Sorkin	Won
Hollywood Foreign Press	Golden Globe Award	Best Actor – Motion Picture Drama	Jesse Eisenberg	Nominated
Hollywood Foreign Press	Golden Globe Award	Best Supporting Actor	Andrew Garfield	Nominated
Hollywood Foreign Press	Golden Globe Award	Best Original Score	Trent Reznor and Atticus Ross	Won
International Press Academy	Satellite Award	Best Film – Drama		Won
International Press Academy	Satellite Award	Best Director	David Fincher	Won
International Press Academy	Satellite Award	Best Actor in a Motion Picture, Drama	Jesse Eisenberg	Nominated
International Press Academy	Satellite Award	Best Actor in a Supporting Role	Andrew Garfield	Nominated
International Press Academy	Satellite Award	Best Screenplay, Adapted	Aaron Sorkin	Won
International Press Academy	Satellite Award	Best Film Editing	Kirk Baxter and Angus Wall	Nominated
International Press Academy	Satellite Award	Best Original Score	Trent Reznor and Atticus Ross	Nominated
National Board of Review of Motion Pictures	NBR Award	Best Film		Won
National Board of Review of Motion Pictures	NBR Award	Best Director	David Fincher	Won
National Board of Review of Motion Pictures	NBR Award	Best Actor	Jesse Eisenberg	Won
National Board of Review of Motion Pictures	NBR Award	Best Adapted Screenplay	Aaron Sorkin	Won
People's Choice Awards	People's Choice Award	Favorite Drama Movie		Nominated
University of Southern California	USC Scripter Award		Aaron Sorkin	Won
World Soundtrack Awards	World Soundtrack Academy	Best Original Soundtrack of the Year	Trent Reznor & Atticus Ross	Nominated

=== Guild awards ===
Awards
Ceremony	Award	Category	Recipient(s)	Result
American Cinema Editors	ACE Award	Best Edited Feature Film - Dramatic	Kirk Baxter, Angus Wall	Won
American Society of Cinematographers	ASC Award	Outstanding Achievement in Cinematography in Theatrical Releases	Jeff Cronenweth	Nominated
Art Directors Guild	ADG Award	Excellence in Production Design for a Contemporary Film		Nominated
Cinema Audio Society	CAS Award	Outstanding Achievement in Sound Mixing for a Motion Picture	Mark Weingarten; Ren Klyce, David Parker, Michael Semanick	Nominated
Costume Designers Guild	CDG Award	Excellence in Contemporary Film	Jacqueline West	Nominated
Directors Guild of America	DGA Award	Outstanding Directorial Achievement in Feature Film	David Fincher	Nominated
Motion Picture Sound Editors	MPSE Award	Dialogue and ADR in a Feature Film		Won
Motion Picture Sound Editors	MPSE Award	Music in a Feature Film		Nominated
Producers Guild of America	Darryl F. Zanuck Producer of the Year Award	Best Theatrical Motion Picture	Dana Brunetti, Ceán Chaffin, Michael De Luca and Scott Rudin	Nominated
Screen Actors Guild	SAG Award	Outstanding Performance by a Cast in a Motion Picture	Jesse Eisenberg, Andrew Garfield, Armie Hammer, Max Minghella, Josh Pence, Justin Timberlake	Nominated
Screen Actors Guild	SAG Award	Outstanding Performance by a Male Actor in a Leading Role	Jesse Eisenberg	Nominated
Writers Guild of America	WGA Award	Best Adapted Screenplay	Aaron Sorkin	Won

=== Critics groups ===
Awards
Ceremony	Award	Category	Recipient(s)	Result
African-American Film Critics Association	AAFC Award	Best Picture		Won
African-American Film Critics Association	AAFC Award	Top 10 Films		Won
Austin Film Critics Association	AFCA Award	Top 10 Films		Won
Austin Film Critics Association	AFCA Award	Best Adapted Screenplay	Aaron Sorkin	Won
Boston Society of Film Critics	BSFC Award	Best Picture		Won
Boston Society of Film Critics	BSFC Award	Best Director	David Fincher	Won
Boston Society of Film Critics	BSFC Award	Best Actor	Jesse Eisenberg	Won
Boston Society of Film Critics	BSFC Award	Best Supporting Actor	Andrew Garfield	Runner-up
Boston Society of Film Critics	BSFC Award	Best Screenplay	Aaron Sorkin	Won
Boston Society of Film Critics	BSFC Award	Best Use of Music in Film	Trent Reznor and Atticus Ross	Won
Broadcast Film Critics Association	Critics Choice Award	Best Film		Won
Broadcast Film Critics Association	Critics Choice Award	Best Director	David Fincher	Won
Broadcast Film Critics Association	Critics Choice Award	Best Actor	Jesse Eisenberg	Nominated
Broadcast Film Critics Association	Critics Choice Award	Best Supporting Actor	Andrew Garfield	Nominated
Broadcast Film Critics Association	Critics Choice Award	Best Acting Ensemble		Nominated
Broadcast Film Critics Association	Critics Choice Award	Best Adapted Screenplay	Aaron Sorkin	Won
Broadcast Film Critics Association	Critics Choice Award	Best Score	Trent Reznor and Atticus Ross	Won
Broadcast Film Critics Association	Critics Choice Award	Best Editing	Angus Wall and Kirk Baxter	Nominated
Broadcast Film Critics Association	Critics Choice Award	Best Sound		Nominated
Chicago Film Critics Association	CFCA Award	Best Film		Won
Chicago Film Critics Association	CFCA Award	Best Director	David Fincher	Won
Chicago Film Critics Association	CFCA Award	Best Actor	Jesse Eisenberg	Nominated
Chicago Film Critics Association	CFCA Award	Best Supporting Actor	Andrew Garfield	Nominated
Chicago Film Critics Association	CFCA Award	Best Adapted Screenplay	Aaron Sorkin	Won
Chicago Film Critics Association	CFCA Award	Best Cinematography	Jeff Cronenweth	Nominated
Chicago Film Critics Association	CFCA Award	Best Original Score	Trent Reznor and Atticus Ross	Nominated
Chicago Film Critics Association	CFCA Award	Most Promising Performer	Armie Hammer	Nominated
Dallas-Fort Worth Film Critics Association	DFWFCA Award	Top 10 Films		Won
Dallas-Fort Worth Film Critics Association	DFWFCA Award	Best Director	David Fincher	Won
Dallas-Fort Worth Film Critics Association	DFWFCA Award	Best Screenplay	Aaron Sorkin	Won
Detroit Film Critics Society	Detroit Film Critics Society Award	Best Film		Won
Detroit Film Critics Society	Detroit Film Critics Society Award	Best Director	David Fincher	Nominated
Detroit Film Critics Society	Detroit Film Critics Society Award	Best Actor	Jesse Eisenberg	Nominated
Detroit Film Critics Society	Detroit Film Critics Society Award	Best Supporting Actor	Andrew Garfield	Nominated
Detroit Film Critics Society	Detroit Film Critics Society Award	Breakthrough Performance	Andrew Garfield	Nominated
Florida Film Critics Circle	FFCC Award	Best Film		Won
Florida Film Critics Circle	FFCC Award	Best Director	David Fincher	Won
Florida Film Critics Circle	FFCC Award	Best Adapted Screenplay	Aaron Sorkin	Won
Houston Film Critics Society	HFCS Award	Best Picture		Won
Houston Film Critics Society	HFCS Award	Best Director	David Fincher	Won
Houston Film Critics Society	HFCS Award	Best Actor	Jesse Eisenberg	Won
Houston Film Critics Society	HFCS Award	Best Supporting Actor	Andrew Garfield	Nominated
Houston Film Critics Society	HFCS Award	Best Screenplay	Aaron Sorkin	Won
Houston Film Critics Society	HFCS Award	Best Original Score	Trent Reznor and Atticus Ross	Nominated
London Evening Standard	LES Award	Best Actor	Andrew Garfield	Won
London Film Critics' Circle	LFCC Award	Film of the Year		Won
London Film Critics' Circle	LFCC Award	Director of the Year	David Fincher	Won
London Film Critics' Circle	LFCC Award	Actor of the Year	Jesse Eisenberg	Nominated
London Film Critics' Circle	LFCC Award	British Actor in a Supporting Role	Andrew Garfield	Won
London Film Critics' Circle	LFCC Award	Screenwriter of the Year	Aaron Sorkin	Won
Los Angeles Film Critics Association	LAFCA Award	Best Picture		Won
Los Angeles Film Critics Association	LAFCA Award	Best Director	David Fincher	Won
Los Angeles Film Critics Association	LAFCA Award	Best Screenplay	Aaron Sorkin	Won
Los Angeles Film Critics Association	LAFCA Award	Best Music/Score	Trent Reznor and Atticus Ross	Won
National Society of Film Critics	NSFC Award	Best Film		Won
National Society of Film Critics	NSFC Award	Best Director	David Fincher	Won
National Society of Film Critics	NSFC Award	Best Actor	Jesse Eisenberg	Won
National Society of Film Critics	NSFC Award	Best Screenplay	Aaron Sorkin	Won
New York Film Critics Circle	NYFCC Award	Best Film		Won
New York Film Critics Circle	NYFCC Award	Best Director	David Fincher	Won
New York Film Critics Online	NYFCO Award	Best Film		Won
New York Film Critics Online	NYFCO Award	Best Director	David Fincher	Won
New York Film Critics Online	NYFCO Award	Best Screenplay	Aaron Sorkin	Won
Online Film Critics Society	OFCS Award	Best Picture		Won
Online Film Critics Society	OFCS Award	Best Director	David Fincher	Won
Online Film Critics Society	OFCS Award	Best Actor	Jesse Eisenberg	Nominated
Online Film Critics Society	OFCS Award	Best Supporting Actor	Andrew Garfield	Nominated
Online Film Critics Society	OFCS Award	Best Adapted Screenplay	Aaron Sorkin	Won
Online Film Critics Society	OFCS Award	Best Editing		Nominated
San Diego Film Critics Society	SDFCS Award	Best Film		Nominated
San Diego Film Critics Society	SDFCS Award	Best Director	David Fincher	Nominated
San Diego Film Critics Society	SDFCS Award	Best Actor	Jesse Eisenberg	Nominated
San Diego Film Critics Society	SDFCS Award	Best Adapted Screenplay	Aaron Sorkin	Won
San Diego Film Critics Society	SDFCS Award	Best Editing		Nominated
San Diego Film Critics Society	SDFCS Award	Best Original Score	Trent Reznor and Atticus Ross	Nominated
San Diego Film Critics Society	SDFCS Award	Best Cast		Nominated
San Francisco Film Critics Circle	SFCC Award	Best Film		Won
San Francisco Film Critics Circle	SFCC Award	Best Director	David Fincher	Won
San Francisco Film Critics Circle	SFCC Award	Best Adapted Screenplay	Aaron Sorkin	Won
St. Louis Gateway Film Critics Association	SLFCA Award	Best Picture		Won
St. Louis Gateway Film Critics Association	SLFCA Award	Best Director	David Fincher	Won
St. Louis Gateway Film Critics Association	SLFCA Award	Best Actor	Jesse Eisenberg	Nominated
St. Louis Gateway Film Critics Association	SLFCA Award	Best Adapted Screenplay	Aaron Sorkin	Won
St. Louis Gateway Film Critics Association	SLFCA Award	Best Music (Soundtrack or Score)	Trent Reznor and Atticus Ross	Won
Toronto Film Critics Association	TFCA Award	Best Film		Won
Toronto Film Critics Association	TFCA Award	Best Director	David Fincher	Won
Toronto Film Critics Association	TFCA Award	Best Actor	Jesse Eisenberg	Won
Toronto Film Critics Association	TFCA Award	Best Supporting Actor	Armie Hammer	Won
Toronto Film Critics Association	TFCA Award	Best Adapted Screenplay	Aaron Sorkin	Won
Vancouver Film Critics Circle	VFCC Award	Best Film		Won
Vancouver Film Critics Circle	VFCC Award	Best Director	David Fincher	Won
Vancouver Film Critics Circle	VFCC Award	Best Actor	Jesse Eisenberg	Nominated
Vancouver Film Critics Circle	VFCC Award	Best Screenplay	Aaron Sorkin	Won
Washington D.C. Area Film Critics Association	WAFCA Award	Best Film		Won
Washington D.C. Area Film Critics Association	WAFCA Award	Best Director	David Fincher	Won
Washington D.C. Area Film Critics Association	WAFCA Award	Best Actor	Jesse Eisenberg	Nominated
Washington D.C. Area Film Critics Association	WAFCA Award	Best Supporting Actor	Andrew Garfield	Nominated
Washington D.C. Area Film Critics Association	WAFCA Award	Best Adapted Screenplay	Aaron Sorkin	Won
Washington D.C. Area Film Critics Association	WAFCA Award	Best Ensemble		Nominated
Washington D.C. Area Film Critics Association	WAFCA Award	Best Cinematography	Jeff Cronenweth	Nominated
Washington D.C. Area Film Critics Association	WAFCA Award	Best Score	Trent Reznor and Atticus Ross	Nominated
