= Dumb Money =

2023 film by Craig Gillespie

- Theatrical release poster
- Directed by: Craig Gillespie
- Written by: Lauren Schuker Blum; Rebecca Angelo
- Based on: The Antisocial Network by Ben Mezrich
- Produced by: Aaron Ryder; Teddy Schwarzman; Craig Gillespie
- Starring: Paul Dano; Pete Davidson; Vincent D'Onofrio; America Ferrera; Nick Offerman; Anthony Ramos; Sebastian Stan; Shailene Woodley; Seth Rogen
- Cinematography: Nikolas Karakatsanis
- Edited by: Kirk Baxter
- Music by: Will Bates
- Production companies: Black Bear Pictures; Ryder Picture Company; Winklevoss Pictures
- Distributed by: Columbia Pictures; Stage 6 Films (through Sony Pictures Releasing)
- Release dates: September 8, 2023 (TIFF); September 15, 2023 (United States)
- Running time: 104 minutes
- Country: United States
- Language: English
- Budget: $30 million
- Box office: $20.7 million

Dumb Money is a 2023 American biographical comedy-drama film, directed by Craig Gillespie and written by Lauren Schuker Blum and Rebecca Angelo. It is based on the 2021 book The Antisocial Network by Ben Mezrich and chronicles the GameStop short squeeze of January 2021. The film features an ensemble cast that includes Paul Dano, Pete Davidson, Vincent D'Onofrio, America Ferrera, Nick Offerman, Anthony Ramos, Sebastian Stan, Shailene Woodley, and Seth Rogen.

After being filmed in New Jersey from October to November 2022, Dumb Money premiered at the Toronto International Film Festival on September 8, 2023. It was released in the United States by Columbia Pictures (through Sony Pictures Releasing) in select theaters on September 15, 2023, and wide release on September 29, 2023. It received generally positive reviews from critics and grossed $20 million worldwide.

== Plot ==
Keith Gill is a middle-class man working as a financial analyst in Brockton, Massachusetts. During his spare time, he regularly frequents the stock market subreddit r/WallStreetBets, posting his opinions via YouTube live streams under the name Roaring Kitty. He struggles to provide for his family, and his brother Kevin constantly mocks his YouTube work as nerdy garbage.

In July 2020, at the height of the COVID-19 pandemic, Keith notices that video game retailer GameStop's stock is falling. He sinks his life savings into buying stock in it and regularly live-streams updates to his viewers. Despite Kevin and several peers claiming this is a waste of time, by January 2021, activity on r/WallStreetBets reveals that several hedge fund investment firms, including Melvin Capital Management and its founder Gabe Plotkin, have been short-selling stock in the chain on the assumption that GameStop would close. But, aggressive GameStop stock purchases by Keith and other online stock buyers – including struggling nurse Jennifer, GameStop retail employee Marcos, and lesbian UT Austin couple Riri and Harmony – caused a mass increase in GameStop's overall stock price. As a result, Plotkin and other investment CEOs lost hundreds of millions of dollars over the same period. Keith is heralded as a financial guru.

Things take a turn when r/WallStreetBets is temporarily shut down for "inflammatory and vulgar content", triggering a surge of panic selling in GameStop's stock in an attempt to prevent a perceived price drop. When the commission-free stock trading website Robinhood is unable to pay the money for the sales adequately, co-chairman Vlad Tenev, at the behest of Citadel LLC owner Ken Griffin, halts all purchasing of GameStop's stock until Robinhood shores up adequate capital to cover outstanding NSCC requirements created due to the level of purchases. They raise the $3–4 billion necessary, but the subsequent negative backlash results in an investigation by the United States House Committee on Financial Services, with Tenev, Griffin, Plotkin, and Keith all being subpoenaed, the former three for their roles in the fiasco and the latter on suspicion of using the situation to trick the public into making himself rich. As the investors struggle to defend their actions, Keith adamantly denies any wrongdoing, stating he was only doing what anyone with a passing awareness of investment banking would do in that situation.

In the aftermath, post text shows how several of the individuals were affected: Plotkin was forced to shut down Melvin Capital because of the net losses the incident caused; Robinhood was the target of several lawsuits following the fiasco and wound up starting in the stock market significantly lower than it was prior; Harmony was able to use the money she obtained to pay off her family's debt issues and continues her relationship with Riri; Marcos sold half of his GameStop stock and quit his position in the company; Jennifer remains in debt but has retained her shareholding; Keith retired from YouTube in late April to get out of the public eye and sold part of his stocks to get Kevin an expensive car as a way to stop his nagging about how he will not loan him his car for his food deliveries.

== Cast ==
- Paul Dano as Keith Gill
- Pete Davidson as Kevin Gill, Keith's brother
- Vincent D'Onofrio as Steve Cohen
- America Ferrera as Jenny, a viewer of Keith's YouTube channel
- Myha'la Herrold as Riri, a college student and investor
- Nick Offerman as Ken Griffin
- Anthony Ramos as Marcos Barcia, a GameStop store clerk
- Seth Rogen as Gabe Plotkin
- Talia Ryder as Harmony Williams, a college student and investor
- Sebastian Stan as Vlad Tenev
- Shailene Woodley as Caroline Gill, Keith's wife
- Kate Burton as Elaine Gill, Keith and Kevin's mother
- Clancy Brown as Steven Gill, Keith and Kevin's father
- Rushi Kota as Baiju Bhatt
- Larry Owens as Chris, Jennifer's co-worker
- Dane DeHaan as Brad, Marcos's boss
- Olivia Thirlby as Yaara Plotkin, Gabe's wife
- Deniz Akdeniz as Briggsy, Keith's financial colleague
- David Faber as himself, a financial journalist for CNBC

== Production ==
=== Development ===
In January 2021, it was announced that Metro-Goldwyn-Mayer Pictures (MGM) had bought the rights to a book proposal by Ben Mezrich about the then-recent GameStop short squeeze, entitled The Antisocial Network, with producers Michael De Luca—who also produced The Social Network (2010), the film adaptation of Mezrich's book The Accidental Billionaires—and Aaron Ryder attached. In May 2021, Lauren Schuker Blum and Rebecca Angelo were announced to write the screenplay, with Cameron and Tyler Winklevoss (who were subjects in The Accidental Billionaires and The Social Network) executive producing through their Winklevoss Pictures banner. In April 2022, Craig Gillespie signed on as director, with the intention of filming to start later that year around summer or fall. In September, it was announced that the film was retitled to Dumb Money, and production was set to commence in October, with De Luca and MGM dropping out, while Black Bear Pictures acquired financing and sought buyers at the annual Toronto International Film Festival. In October 2022, Sony Pictures bought distribution rights to the film in the United States, Latin America, Scandinavia, Eastern Europe, South Africa and India for $20 million.

=== Casting ===
In September 2022, Paul Dano, Seth Rogen, Sebastian Stan and Pete Davidson were set to star; Rogen and Stan previously collaborated with Gillespie on the miniseries Pam & Tommy (2022), with Stan also having starred in Gillespie's film I, Tonya (2017). The following month, Shailene Woodley, Anthony Ramos, Vincent D'Onofrio, Dane DeHaan, Myha'la Herrold, America Ferrera, Rushi Kota, Nick Offerman, and Talia Ryder joined the cast.

=== Filming ===
Principal photography occurred in New Jersey from October to November 2022. Filming was done in Morris, Essex, Monmouth and Hudson counties, with scenes filmed at Saint Elizabeth University.

== Music ==
Composed by Will Bates, the soundtrack was released on September 22, 2023.

== Release ==
Dumb Money premiered at the Toronto International Film Festival on September 8, 2023, with the cast unable to attend due to the 2023 SAG-AFTRA strike. It was released theatrically in the United States by Sony Pictures Releasing under the Columbia Pictures and Stage 6 Films labels, while Sony, Black Bear International and other local distributors released it internationally. The film was initially set to be distributed by MGM. A release date of October 20, 2023, was initially announced, before being moved up to September 22, 2023. It was later changed to a limited theatrical release on September 15, 2023, before expanding to a wide release on September 29, 2023.

Dumb Money was released on digital platforms on November 7, followed by a Blu-ray and DVD release on December 12.

== Reception ==
=== Box office ===
Dumb Money has grossed $13.9 million in the United States and Canada and $6.8 million in other territories, for a total of $20.7 million worldwide.

In the United States and Canada, Dumb Money was released alongside A Haunting in Venice and made $229,947 from eight theaters in its opening weekend. Expanding to 616 theaters in its second weekend, the film made $2.4 million, finishing in eighth. In its third weekend the film made $3.3 million from 2,837 theaters, finishing in seventh. It then made $2.1 million and $930,000 in the subsequent two weekends.

=== Critical response ===
On the review aggregator website Rotten Tomatoes, 84% of 232 critics' reviews are positive, with an average rating of 6.8/10. The website's consensus reads: "Dumb Money's crowd-pleasing dramatization of real-life stock hijinks may not tell the complete story, but it's rousingly entertaining nonetheless." Metacritic, which uses a weighted average, assigned the film a score of 66 out of 100, based on 53 critics, indicating "generally favorable" reviews.

=== Accolades ===
Award	Date of ceremony	Category	Recipient(s)	Result	Ref.
Celebration of Cinema & Television	December 4, 2023	Groundbreaker Award	America Ferrera (also for Barbie)	Won	
Cinema for Peace Awards	February 18–19, 2024	Cinema for Peace Dove for The Most Valuable Film of the Year 2024	Dumb Money	Nominated	
