= Sex on the Moon =

2011 book by Ben Mezrich

Sex on the Moon: The Amazing Story Behind the Most Audacious Heist in History
- Cover of the first edition
- Author: Ben Mezrich
- Language: English
- Subject: Stolen Moon rocks
- Genre: Non-fiction
- Publisher: Doubleday
- Publication date: July 12, 2011
- Publication place: United States
- Media type: Print
- Pages: 304
- ISBN: 978-0-385-53392-8
- OCLC: 666230411
- Preceded by: The Accidental Billionaires
- Followed by: Straight Flush

Sex on the Moon: The Amazing Story Behind the Most Audacious Heist in History is a 2011 book by Ben Mezrich, author of New York Times Best Seller Bringing Down the House and of The Accidental Billionaires. It retells the theft and attempted sale of lunar samples plus a Martian meteorite from a vault at NASA's Lyndon B. Johnson Space Center by a cooperative education student assisted by another co-op, an intern, plus an acquaintance.

The book received mainly negative reviews, criticized for its purple prose and overly sympathetic discussion of the ringleader.

== Summary ==
The story follows Thad Roberts, a University of Utah student and high-achieving NASA co-op in Houston, dreaming of doing great things such as becoming an astronaut; his love interest Rebecca; and his accomplices Sandra and Gordon McWhorter. The group stole lunar samples from Building 31, had sex on a bed covered by the precious stones, were arrested by the FBI during a sting operation in Orlando, and sentenced. The book also describes Thad's release from jail.

== Reception ==
In a review in The Globe and Mail, the book is described as "in the pulp-non-fiction genre, crafted with colour-saturated prose and hyperbolic plot points that have its screenplay in view", but was criticized for failing to identify or explore why Roberts undertook the theft in the first place, "other than sex". A review in The New York Times criticized Mezrich's writing style for being excessively elaborate and dramatic, and for both the book and Roberts repeating the themes and style of his previous works, most notably the biography of Facebook founder Mark Zuckerberg, The Accidental Billionaires.

The writing of Sex on the Moon was described as "cookie-cutter" and Roberts having a motivation of "a desire to be cool and attract hot babes". The review also criticized the book for highlighting the drama of the events without noting that Roberts' actions resulted in the destruction of 30 years’ worth of research notes regarding the Moon rocks by Roberts' NASA mentor, Everett K. Gibson. A review in The A.V. Club also compared the book to The Accidental Billionaires and Mezrich's portrayal of Roberts to his portrayal of Zuckerberg, stating that the novel-like approach to a nonfiction book was jarring at times, but had the advantage of providing a strong characterization of the central player, Roberts. A review in USA Today gave the book two out of four stars and stated that "Mezrich has a credibility gap that shines through writing that's overwrought, overstated, over-everything." The review criticized Mezrich's prose for being excessively flowery, and for recreating dialogue a decade after the conversations took place, which allowed for a more compelling narrative but raised serious questions about the book's resulting accuracy. A review for CNN also noted Mezrich's repeating choice of writing about "young geniuses, some with questionable ethics". A review written for The Daily Beast describes the choice to write from Roberts' perspective as a "narrative pitfall" given he appears to be "somewhat delusional", making it hard to differentiate fact from fiction, and notes that Mezrich takes frequent "creative liberties". The review also criticized Mezrich for being overly sympathetic to Roberts and his rationalizations for his actions. A review for Boston describes the book as containing "impressively hackneyed writing", but a fast read with many interesting details, though it does not deal with the moral dilemmas raised by Roberts' actions. The characterization of Roberts is seen as the main flaw, who is described as "off-putting" and unsympathetic with "glib rationalization" for his actions, ultimately coming off as a "sad sociopath". Kirkus Reviews describes the lead-up to the theft as the most interesting part of the book, but the prose as "overheated", and states that Mezrich fails in his efforts to portray Roberts, ultimately a "small-time crook", as a hero.

In 2011, the book was optioned by Sony Pictures Entertainment, who also produced The Social Network based on Mezrich's biography of Mark Zuckerberg.
