= Sexiest Bachelor in America Pageant =

- Date: October 2, 2000
- Hosts: Caroline Rhea
- Venue: Las Vegas, Nevada
- Broadcaster: Fox
- Winner: Tom Gill; Virginia

The Sexiest Bachelor in America Pageant was a male beauty pageant televised on Fox on October 2, 2000. It was held in Las Vegas, Nevada. It was the only male beauty pageant aired on American television. The pageant was only held once.

At the conclusion of the final competition, Tom Gill, a schoolteacher from Virginia, won the title.

Caroline Rhea hosted the event. The all-female panel of judges included soap star Kristian Alfonso, Miss USA 1997 Brook Lee, and model Roshumba Williams.

The pageant was also notable in that one of the contestants, Brian Lee Randone (Mr. Nebraska), was later arrested for the murder of his girlfriend, Felicia Tang Lee (a pornstar who performed under the name "Felicia Tang").

== Results ==
=== Placements ===
- Sexiest Bachelor in America 2000: Tom Gill of Virginia
- The runners-up were:
  - 1st runner-up - Matt Thomas (Illinois)
  - 2nd runner-up - Matt Funk (North Dakota)
  - 3rd runner-up - Reed Randoy (Arizona)
  - 4th runner-up - Blair Dickens (Louisiana)
- The remaining top ten semi-finalists were: Stephen Seebeck of Missouri, Billy Jeffrey of Idaho, Zack Leonard of Oklahoma, David Danho of New Jersey, and Raheem Bennett of Oregon.

=== Scores ===
State	Swimsuit
Arizona	8.74 (6)
Missouri	8.60 (8)
Oregon	9.04 (5)
North Dakota	8.66 (7)
Illinois	9.80 (1)
Idaho	8.38 (9)
Louisiana	9.04 (5)
Oklahoma	9.14 (3)
New Jersey	9.08 (4)
Virginia	9.50 (2)

Winner
First Runner-up
Second Runner-up
Third Runner-up
Fourth Runner-up
Top 10 Semifinalist
(#) Rank in round of competition

== Notes ==
- Mr. Massachusetts, Ben Mezrich, who did not place, wrote the book about Facebook that the movie The Social Network was based on.
- Top 10 semifinalist Billy Jeffrey later became a Chippendales dancer and was a contestant on season 1 of the show True Beauty.
- Mr. Maryland, Teddy Sears, later was an actor on One Life to Live.
