= The Antisocial Network =

2021 nonfiction book by Ben Mezrich

- Book cover
- Author: Ben Mezrich
- Language: English
- Genre: Non-fiction
- Publisher: Grand Central Publishing
- Publication date: September 7, 2021; 5 years ago
- Publication place: United States
- Pages: 304
- ISBN: 9781538707555

The Antisocial Network: The GameStop Short Squeeze and the Ragtag Group of Amateur Traders That Brought Wall Street to Its Knees (or simply The Antisocial Network) is a 2021 non-fiction book by Ben Mezrich about the GameStop short squeeze.

The 2023 film Dumb Money is based on the book.

== Background ==
The book covers the events of the GameStop short squeeze, which saw the collapse of Melvin Capital as users of r/wallstreetbets and other retail traders initiated a short squeeze on stocks like GameStop, AMC and Bed, Bath & Beyond.

It was published by Grand Central Publishing in the United States on September 7, 2021. HarperCollins published the book in the United Kingdom on September 16, 2021.

== Reception ==
The book had a mixed critical reception. Many critics including Publishers Weekly praised the book's pacing and exciting narrative, while other critics felt it sensationalized the events depicted. Giri Nathan of The New York Times criticized Mezrich's use of artistic license in recounting the events of the book. Kirkus Reviews described it as "touch long and wobbly but just the thing for alt-finance geeks".

== Film adaptation ==
Metro-Goldwyn-Mayer acquired the rights to Mezrich's book proposal prior to its publication. The film, titled Dumb Money, was directed by Craig Gillespie. It was released in the United States on September 22, 2023.
