= Straight Flush (disambiguation) =

A straight flush is a type of poker hand.

Straight Flush was a B-29 Superfortress.

Straight Flush may also refer to:

- Straight Flush (book)
- "Straight Flush" (FBI), a television episode
- "Straight Flush", the radar for the 2K12 Kub
