= Kirk Baxter =

Australian film editor

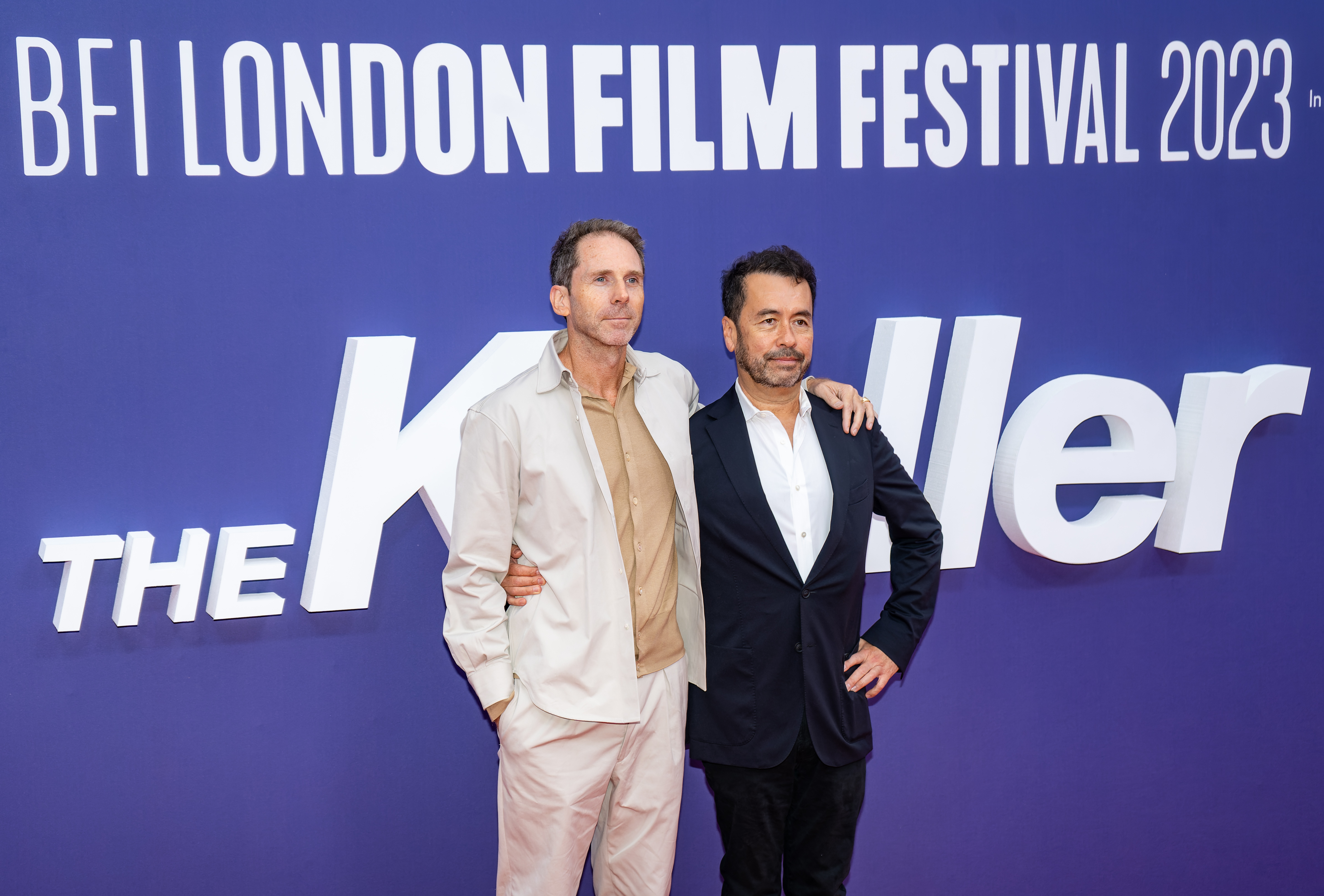
- Baxter and Ren Klyce on the red carpet for The Killer
- Born: 1972 (age 53–54); Sydney, Australia
- Occupation: Film editor
- Spouse: Susan Murphy
- Children: 1
- Awards: Academy Award for Best Film Editing: The Social Network (2010); The Girl with the Dragon Tattoo (2011)

Kirk Baxter (born 1972) is an Australian film editor. He has worked with director David Fincher and editor Angus Wall several times, winning Academy Awards for The Social Network and The Girl with the Dragon Tattoo.

== Early life ==
Baxter grew up on Sydney's Northern Beaches and attended Pittwater High School.

At age 17, Baxter's school gave him the chance to undertake work experience with a local production company, Ross Wood Productions. The company had a range of departments in both production and post-production, allowing Baxter to see how directors, cinematographers, editors, focus pullers, grips and gaffers operated. Baxter quickly fell in love with the editorial process and dropped out of school to pursue a career.

Baxter was a full-time assistant editor by the age of 18.

== Career ==
Due to a scarcity of work in the Australian film industry, Baxter focused primarily on editing commercials. He was an early adopter of Avid, a non-linear editing software. Due to his family's Scottish heritage, Baxter was able to secure a British Passport and moved to London at age 23. Baxter worked for the post-production house Final Cut (not to be confused with the software). He soon begin flying to the United States for projects with British directors abroad. Preferring both the lifestyle and wages, Baxter decided to emigrate to the US after six years in London. He led the newly opened Final Cut offices in New York. Baxter co-owns editorial company Exile Edit.

In 2004, Baxter joined Angus Wall's firm Rock Paper Scissors, which specialised in feature film and commercial work. Baxter then worked with Wall as an "additional editor" on David Fincher's film Zodiac. When Wall began to prepare to edit The Curious Case of Benjamin Button, he proposed to Fincher that Baxter be the co-editor.

Baxter and Wall were nominated for the Academy Award for Best Film Editing, the BAFTA Award for Best Editing, and the American Cinema Editors Eddie Award for their work on The Curious Case of Benjamin Button. For their work on The Social Network, Baxter and Wall won an Oscar and a BAFTA in 2011. The following year, they won a second Oscar for The Girl with the Dragon Tattoo. Baxter refutes that Fincher does "a thousand takes", saying "it is not the same angle getting repeated a thousand times, it is coverage. So there is always somewhere to be in the scene...It’s the volume of angles that really differentiates how information is presented in David’s work."

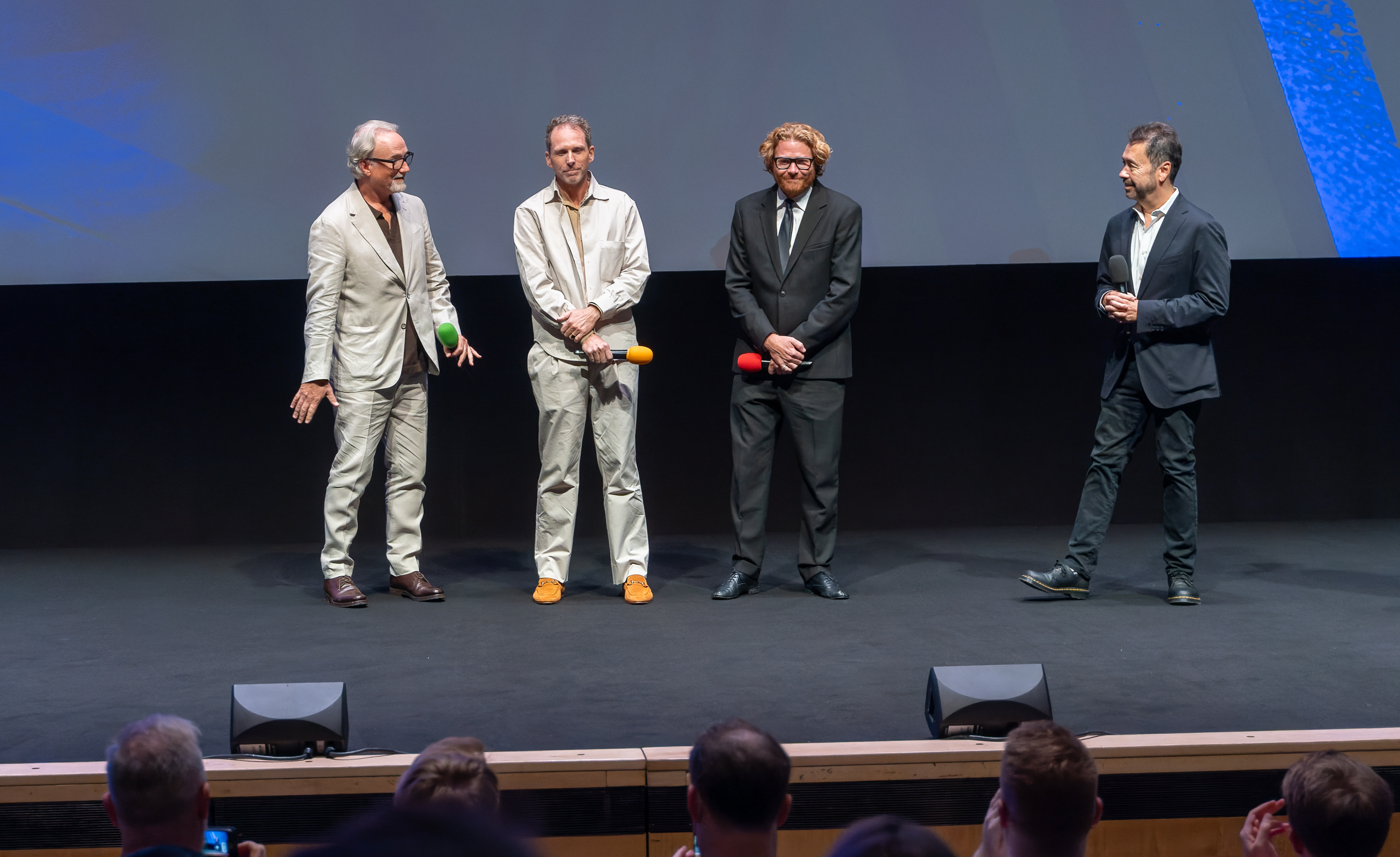
Fincher, Baxter, Erik Messerschmidt and Klyce on stage for The Killer

In 2014, Baxter edited Gone Girl, his first solo editorial credit with David Fincher. It was the first Hollywood film to be cut entirely in Premiere Pro. Baxter said they chose the software "to bring all the After Effects closer. Shots could be stabilized, have split screens done perfectly, all the editing within scenes of inside monitors. There’s VFX in every couple of shots... It’s about speed and working with the most up to date material immediately. It’s creating the best sort of utopia for a village.”

Baxter also has editorial credits for Fincher's TV Series Mindhunter, House of Cards and Love, Death and Robots. In 2023, Baxter edited Dumb Money, his first non-Fincher feature film.

== Approach to editing ==
Typically, Baxter joins the production early, starting to cut after the second or third day of shooting. He starts by treating each scene as a sole entity, a unit he will extensively fine cut even before the whole film is assembled. Baxter likens editing to a headgame, similar to writing.

When working with Fincher, Baxter will initially cut and align dailies as they are positioned in a scene, allowing quick changes between takes and camera angle for every line of dialogue or action. The method allows Fincher to quickly review Baxter's choices for coverage and understand why he has chosen one angle over another for each moment.

Baxter prefers not to visit the set, having stated that his workload and a desire to be at a distance from the shooting process keep him away. The separation helps to keep Baxter's eyes fresh and prevents his editorial choices being biased by what he experiences on set.

When asked if he was a "tech head", Baxter replied that he has "no curiosity in the technology at all. It just allows me to do my work efficiently."

== Filmography (as editor) ==
Year	Film	Director	Notes
2008	The Curious Case of Benjamin Button	David Fincher	Nominated—Academy Award for Best Film Editing; Nominated—American Cinema Editors Award for Best Edited Feature Film – Dramatic; Nominated—BAFTA Award for Best Editing
2010	The Social Network	David Fincher	Academy Award for Best Film Editing; American Cinema Editors Award for Best Edited Feature Film – Dramatic; BAFTA Award for Best Editing; Nominated—Alliance of Women Film Journalists Award for Best Film Editing; Nominated—Critics' Choice Movie Award for Best Editing; Nominated—Satellite Award for Best Editing
2011	The Girl with the Dragon Tattoo	David Fincher	Academy Award for Best Film Editing; Critics' Choice Movie Award for Best Editing; Nominated—American Cinema Editors Award for Best Edited Feature Film – Dramatic
2014	Gone Girl	David Fincher	Nominated—American Cinema Editors Award for Best Edited Feature Film – Dramatic; Nominated—Chicago Film Critics Association Award for Best Editing; Nominated—Critics' Choice Movie Award for Best Editing; Nominated—Online Film Critics Society Award for Best Editing; Nominated—Phoenix Film Critics Society Award for Best Editing; Nominated—San Diego Film Critics Society Award for Best Editing; Nominated—Washington D.C. Area Film Critics Association Award for Best Editing
2020	Mank	David Fincher	Nominated—American Cinema Editors Award for Best Edited Feature Film – Dramatic; Nominated—Greater Western New York Film Critics Association Award for Best Editing; Nominated—Satellite Award for Best Editing
2023	The Killer	David Fincher	
2023	Dumb Money	Craig Gillespie	
2025	A House of Dynamite	Kathryn Bigelow	Nominated—BAFTA Award for Best Editing; Nominated—Critics' Choice Movie Award for Best Editing
2026	The Further Mis-Adventures of Cliff Booth	David Fincher	

== Television ==
Year	Title	Notes
2013	House of Cards	2 Episodes (Chapter 1 & 2)
2017-19	Mindhunter	8 Episodes
2022	Love, Death and Robots	1 Episode (S3 E2); Won - American Cinema Editors Awards 2023 for Best Edited Animated Series
2022	Mike	2 Episodes

== Further Viewing ==
- David Fincher’s Editor Reveals The Key To Make ANY Edit Work
