= Fatal Error =

1999 film by Armand Mastroianni

- Genre: Action; Sci-fi
- Based on: Reaper by Ben Mezrich
- Screenplay by: Rockne S. O'Bannon
- Directed by: Armand Mastroianni
- Starring: Janine Turner; Antonio Sabàto Jr.
- Music by: Ron Ramin
- Country of origin: United States
- Original language: English

Production
- Producers: Rick Arredondo; Randy Sutter
- Cinematography: David Geddes
- Editor: Peter V. White
- Running time: 91 minutes
- Production companies: Stephanie Germain Productions; Von Zerneck Sertner Films; TBS Superstation

Original release
- Network: TBS
- Release: March 28, 1999

Fatal Error is a 1999 American television film starring Janine Turner and Antonio Sabàto Jr. based on Ben Mezrich's 1998 novel Reaper. The film premiered on TBS on March 28, 1999.

It also stars Robert Wagner, Malcolm Stewart and Catherine Lough Haggquist.

== Reception ==
David Kronke of Variety said, "TBS' maiden entry into original filmmaking, "Fatal Error," is a diverting enough cautionary technophobic thriller pointedly commenting on the ossifying effects of addiction to TV and computers, even if the filmmakers don't exploit the satire particularly well." Earl Cressey of DVD Talk said, "Fatal Error starts off fairly decent, but soon delves into the regular rut of most made for TV films: it becomes predictable and clichéd. It almost seems like The X-Files gone bad."
