= Straight Flush (book) =

2013 book by Ben Mezrich

Straight Flush The True Story of Six College Friends Who Dealt Their Way to a Billion-Dollar Online Poker Empire—and How It All Came Crashing Down...
- Hardcover edition
- Author: Ben Mezrich
- Language: English
- Subject: On-line gambling
- Genre: Non-fiction
- Publisher: William Morrow and Company
- Publication date: May 28, 2013
- Publication place: United States
- Media type: Print, e-book
- Pages: 304 pp.
- ISBN: 978-0062240095
- Preceded by: Sex on the Moon

Straight Flush: The True Story of Six College Friends Who Dealt Their Way to a Billion-Dollar Online Poker Empire—and How It All Came Crashing Down is a book by Ben Mezrich. The text was published on May 28, 2013, by William Morrow and Company. Straight Flush tells the story of a group of University of Montana students who turned their weekly poker game into AbsolutePoker.com, one of the largest online gambling companies in the world.

== Reception ==
Straight Flush received mixed to scathing reviews. James McManus wrote in The Wall Street Journal that Straight Flush was "not just a book about clueless adolescent venality, 'Straight Flush' is that sorry thing itself, and in spades." Haley Hintze, a writer who helped uncover the Absolute Poker scandal, labeled the book a "literary fraud" in an eleven part series.

Don Oldenburg writing in USA Today notes one of the book's problems is "how much Mezrich himself seems in awe of" the sordid activity he is describing.

== See also ==
- The Eudaemonic Pie
