= World Blackjack Tour =

The World Blackjack Tour is an original GSN program that premiered September 4, 2006. Broadcast from the Las Vegas Hilton, five players representing five different nations play 21 hands of blackjack for a first prize of $10,000. The show is hosted by John Fugelsang and Ben Mezrich. In the course of the debut broadcast the hosts announced plans to take the World Blackjack Tour to casinos around the globe.

== Results ==
Position	Player	Representing	Winnings
1	Sergio Segura	Mexico	$10,000
2	Henry Tran	Canada	$5,000
3	Rena Sines	Greece	$2,000
4	Kami Lis	Poland	$0
5	Ken Einiger	United States	$0

== See also ==
- Elimination Blackjack
