= Eduardo Saverin =

Brazilian internet entrepreneur (born 1982)

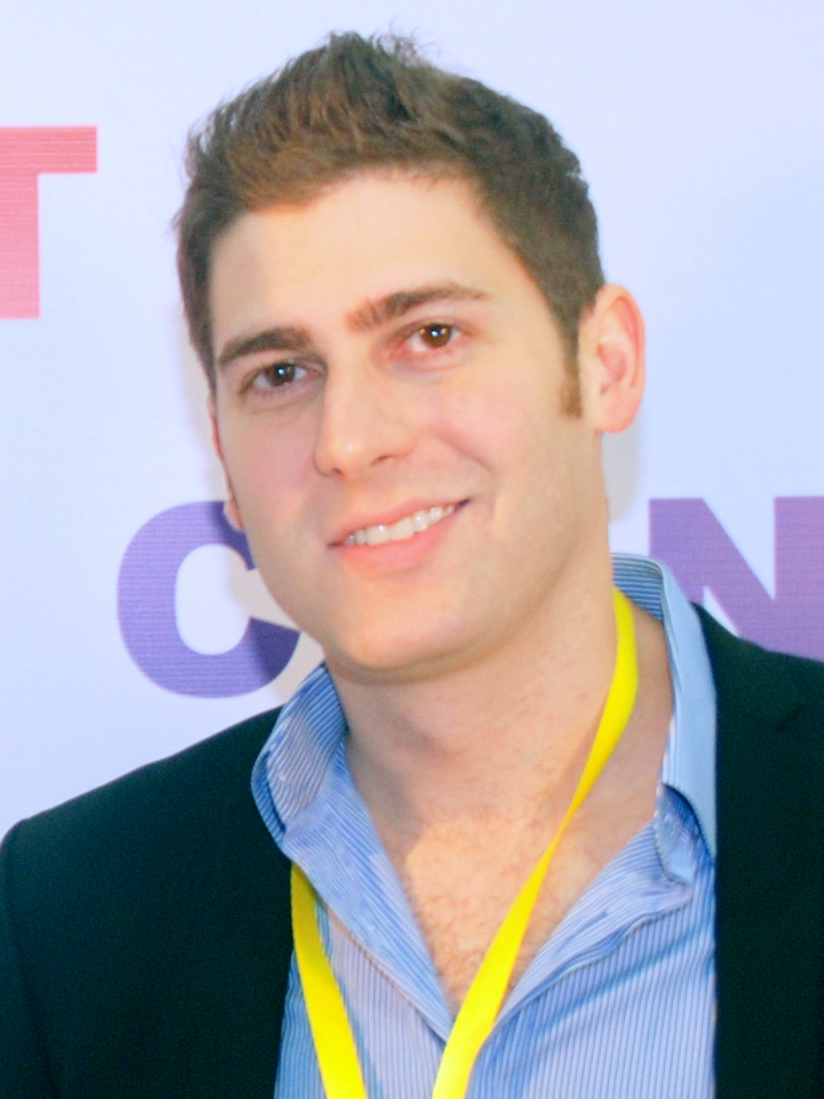
- Saverin in 2012
- Born: Eduardo Luiz Saverin; March 19, 1982 (age 44); São Paulo, Brazil
- Citizenship: Brazil (1982–present); United States (1998–2011)
- Education: Harvard University (BA)
- Known for: Co-founder of Facebook; Co-founder of B Capital
- Spouse: Elaine Andriejanssen (m. 2015)
- Children: 1
- Website: facebook.com/saverin

Eduardo Luiz Saverin (/ˈsævərɪn/ SAV-ər-in, Brazilian Portuguese: [eduˈaʁdu luˈis saveˈɾĩ]; born March 19, 1982) is a Brazilian entrepreneur, angel investor, and philanthropist known for co-founding Facebook. Based in Singapore, he is the co-founder and co-CEO of the venture capital firm B Capital with Raj Ganguly.

Saverin is the wealthiest Brazilian, with an estimated net worth of US$42.9 billion as of 25 September 2026, according to Forbes, and the 47th richest individual in the world. His net worth makes him the wealthiest person in Singapore and the third richest from Latin America.

== Early life and education ==
Eduardo Luiz Saverin was born in São Paulo to a wealthy Jewish-Brazilian family, who later moved to Rio de Janeiro. His father, Roberto Saverin, was a businessman working in clothing, shipping, energy, and real estate. His mother, Sandra, was a psychologist; she died in 2020. He has two siblings. His Romanian-born grandfather, Eugenio Saverin (born Eugen Saverin), founded Tip Top, a chain of children's clothing shops. In 1993, the family emigrated to the US, settling in Miami, Florida.

Saverin attended Gulliver Preparatory School in Miami. He then attended Harvard University, where he was a resident of Eliot House, a member of the Phoenix S.K. Club, and president of the Harvard Investment Association. While an undergraduate at Harvard, Saverin used his interest in meteorology to predict hurricane patterns and made US$300,000 from investments in oil futures. In 2006, Saverin graduated magna cum laude from Harvard University with a Bachelor of Arts in economics. He is a member of the Alpha Epsilon Pi fraternity (Eta Psi chapter of Harvard University).

== Career ==
During his junior year at Harvard, Saverin met fellow Harvard undergraduate, sophomore Mark Zuckerberg. Noting the lack of a dedicated social networking website for Harvard students, the two worked together to launch Facebook in 2004. They each agreed to invest $1,000 in the site. Later, Zuckerberg and Saverin each agreed to invest another $18,000 in the operation. As co-founder, Saverin held the role of chief financial officer and business manager.

In 2012, weeks prior to the initial public offering of Facebook, Saverin renounced his U.S. citizenship. Saverin had been living in Singapore since 2009. It is speculated that this was to save on capital gains tax.

In May 2012, Business Insider published emails from Zuckerberg discussing plans to dilute Saverin's stake in Facebook and restructure the company's ownership. The emails indicated Zuckerberg's frustration with Saverin's lack of cooperation, while his attorney warned that the actions could prompt a lawsuit for breach of fiduciary duty. Facebook later sued Saverin over a 2005 stock-purchase agreement; Saverin countersued alleging misuse of company funds, and the parties settled out of court in 2009, with Saverin retaining recognition as a Facebook co-founder and signing a non-disclosure agreement.

In addition to forming B Capital, in early 2020, Saverin invested in Antler, an early-stage venture capital fund and startup accelerator.

In 2026, Saverin was part of 1892 Holdings, a consortium that acquired a 38% stake in Liverpool F.C..

== Personal life ==
Saverin immigrated to Singapore in 2009. Saverin and Elaine Andriejanssen, an Indonesian national of Chinese and Dutch descent, became engaged on March 27, 2014, and were married on June 25, 2015. They met while attending university in Massachusetts, where Saverin studied at Harvard University and Andriejanssen at Tufts University. Andriejanssen, who works in the finance industry, comes from a wealthy family that runs several businesses in Indonesia.

Eduardo and Elaine registered the charity Eduardo and Elaine Saverin Foundation in Singapore in 2023. Their donations focus on the areas of education, wildlife conservation, health care, and mental health. According to the Strait Times, the organization is one of the ten largest private donors in the country.

== In media ==
Saverin is played by Andrew Garfield in the film The Social Network, which is based on Ben Mezrich's The Accidental Billionaires.
