= Craig Gillespie =

Australian film director (born 1967)

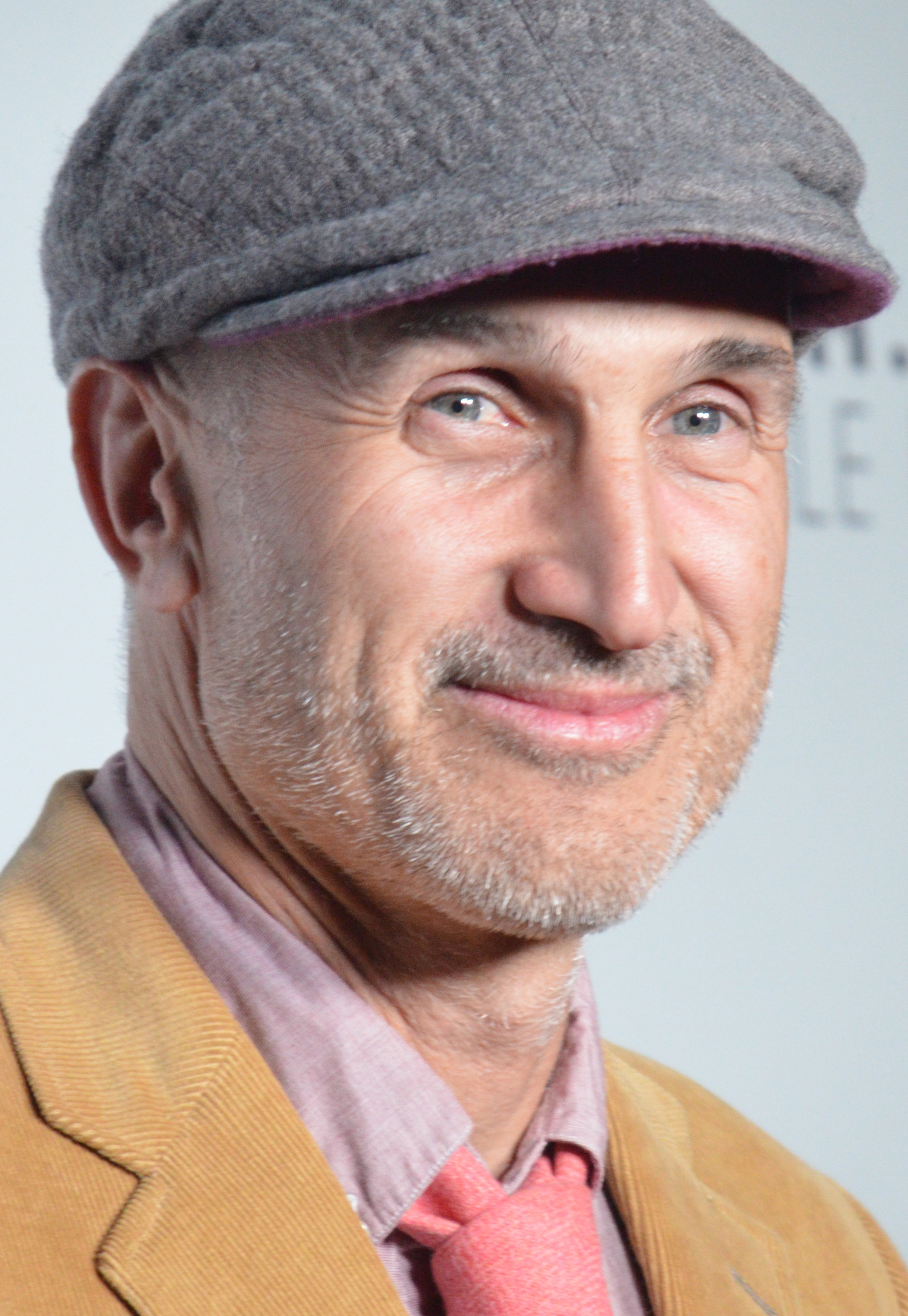
- Gillespie in 2013
- Born: 1 September 1967 (age 59); Sydney, New South Wales, Australia
- Occupations: Film director Commercial director Television director
- Years active: 1995–present
- Notable work: Lars and the Real Girl; Fright Night; I, Tonya; Cruella; Dumb Money; Supergirl

Craig Gillespie (born 1 September 1967) is an Australian-American film, television, music video, and commercial director. He is best known for directing the films Lars and the Real Girl (2007), Fright Night (2011), I, Tonya (2017), Cruella (2021), Dumb Money (2023) and Supergirl (2026).

== Early life ==
Born and raised in Sydney, Gillespie moved to New York City at the age of nineteen to study illustration, graphic design and advertising at Manhattan's School of Visual Arts.

== Career ==
Gillespie started out as an intern at ad agency J. Walter Thompson, New York. He then moved on to D'Arcy Masius Benton & Bowles, BBDO, Deutsch, and Ammirati & Puris, first as an art director, later as a creative director. After eight years working on the agency side, he moved into directing in 1995. Based on the strength of his spec reel and agency experience, he gained representation by production company Fahrenheit Films in late 1995. One year later, he signed with Coppos Films. He has been with MJZ since 2000 and continues to work as a commercial director, commonly working with cinematographers Masanobu Takayanagi and Rodrigo Prieto. Following nominations in 2001 and 2002 in the Directors Guild of America Award category for "Outstanding Directorial Achievement in Commercials", he won in 2006 for his Ameriquest and Altoids commercials. He also won a Golden Lion Award at 2005's Cannes Lions International Advertising Festival, and two of his commercials belong to the Museum of Modern Art in Midtown Manhattan's permanent collection. His commercial for Snickers featuring Betty White playing backyard football was voted the top ad of Super Bowl XLIV by USA Today and is credited with renewing public interest in the actress.

Gillespie's debut feature film was 2007's Mr. Woodcock. He left the project after several negative test screenings, and many scenes were re-written and re-shot. David Dobkin replaced Gillespie in the director's role. Upon initially receiving the script, Gillespie had assumed that audiences would respond well to the dark humor he had been using in his commercials, but, according to him, "it was obvious the audience wanted a broader comedy, not the one I'd made. I appreciated the predicament New Line was in, so I stepped aside." Less than a month after principal photography of Mr. Woodcock concluded, Gillespie set up pre-production of Lars and the Real Girl. He had had the Lars script for four years, but had not yet attached any cast members or approached a studio. He had first read the script before he was attached to Mr. Woodcock, but the pitch for Lars and the Real Girl—a man falling in love with a sex doll—which he had almost turned down himself, believing the premise to be an "absurd notion", put off many major studios. He chose to direct Mr. Woodcock first.

Gillespie directed several episodes, including the pilot, of the first season of Steven Spielberg and Diablo Cody's television series United States of Tara. He was set to re-team with Lars and the Real Girl lead actor Ryan Gosling for Dallas Buyers Club, a film telling the true story of Ron Woodroof, an electrician given six months to live after he was diagnosed with AIDS, but used a variety of drugs which he smuggled to other AIDS patients to live for another six years. However, the directing job instead went to Jean-Marc Vallée and Matthew McConaughey as Ron Woodroof. In March 2010, it was announced that Gillespie would direct the Fright Night remake, starring Colin Farrell, Anton Yelchin and Toni Collette for the lead roles. Gillespie and Sam Worthington won the 2009 Australians in Film Breakthrough Award.

In 2011, he directed the music video for Kid Cudi's single, "No One Believes Me". Gillespie finalized his contract to direct an adaptation of Pride and Prejudice and Zombies on 18 April 2011. but he later left the film. In April 2014, it was announced that Gillespie would direct the film The Finest Hours about the Coast Guard who tries to save the crews of two oil tankers in 1952. Chris Pine, Casey Affleck, Josh Stewart, Graham McTavish and Kyle Gallner star in the film for Walt Disney Pictures. The sets for the film were made in Quincy, Massachusetts.

Gillespie directed I, Tonya (2017), a biographical film about figure skater Tonya Harding, starring Margot Robbie, Sebastian Stan and Allison Janney. In December 2018, it was announced that Gillespie would replace Alex Timbers (due to the latter's scheduling conflicts) as director for Disney's live-action spin-off of One Hundred and One Dalmatians titled Cruella, with Emma Stone portraying Cruella de Vil; the film premiered on May 28, 2021. In June 2021, it was announced that he would return to direct a sequel to Cruella.

In April 2022, Gillespie signed on to direct a film adaptation of Ben Mezrich's book The Antisocial Network, about the GameStop short squeeze for Metro-Goldwyn-Mayer. The film, entitled Dumb Money, was released on September 22, 2023, by Sony Pictures Releasing. In April 2024, Gillespie entered negotiations to direct the DC Studios superhero film Supergirl, set in the DC Universe (DCU). In May, he was confirmed to direct the film set for release on June 26, 2026.

== Filmography ==
Film

Year	Title	Director	Producer
2007	Mr. Woodcock	Yes	No
2007	Lars and the Real Girl	Yes	No
2011	Fright Night	Yes	No
2014	Million Dollar Arm	Yes	No
2016	The Finest Hours	Yes	No
2017	I, Tonya	Yes	Executive
2021	Cruella	Yes	No
2023	Dumb Money	Yes	Yes
2026	Supergirl	Yes	No

Television

Key
†	Denotes television productions that have not yet been released

Year	Title	Director	Executive producer	Notes
2009–10	United States of Tara	Yes	Consulting	Directed 6 episodes
2010	My Generation	Yes	No	Directed episode: "Pilot"
2013	Trooper	Yes	Yes	Unaired pilot
2021–22	Physical	Yes	Yes	Directed episode: "Let's Do This Thing"
2022	Pam & Tommy	Yes	Yes	Directed 3 episodes
2022	Mike	Yes	Yes	Directed 4 episodes
2025	The Better Sister	Yes	Yes	Directed episode: "She's My Sister"
2025–present	Your Friends & Neighbors	Yes	Yes	Directed 2 episodes
TBA	The Husbands †	Yes	Yes	
TBA	Guilty Creatures †	Yes	Yes	

Music videos

- Kid Cudi – "No One Believes Me"

Commercials

- 7-Eleven – "Belly Flop", "Ducks"
- Acura – "Transactions"
- Aerial Communications – "Lost"
- Altoids – "Fruit Bat", "Mother Tongue", "People of Pain" (Won – Directors Guild of America Award for Outstanding Directing – Commercials)
- Ameriquest – "Robbery", "Surprise Dinner" (Won – Directors Guild of America Award for Outstanding Directing – Commercials), "Mother-in-Law", "Parking Meter", "Doctor", "Friendly Skies", "Concert"
- Audi – "Commander", "Driver", "New Santa"
- Bud Light – "Groupies"
- Call of Duty – "Codnapped", "Ultimate Team"
- CareerBuilder – "Job Fairy", "Casual Friday"
- Cars.com – "David Abernathy", "Timothy Richman"
- CDW/Cisco – "Dysfunction by Aging Rock Stars. Orchestration by CDW."
- Citi – "Dressing Up", "Mountain", "Runner"
- Consumers Energy – "Milk", "Dog Dish"
- DirecTV – "Chair", "Chinese Food", "Vase"
- Dunkin' Donuts – "Joke", "Parking Lot", "Phone"
- Emerald Nuts/Pop Secret – "Awesomer"
- ESPN – "Alarm Clocks", "Paper Jam"
- FedEx – "Drafting", "Gin Rummy", "Perspective"
- FirstNBC – "Refund", "Rich Guy"
- Fruit of the Loom – "Boxers", "Ceremonial Fruit", "Shirts"
- GEICO – "Balding", "CEO", "House", "Rapper", "Soap"
- Guinness – "Slide"
- Holiday Inn Express – "Jeopardy"
- H&R Block – "Where's Your W-2?", "Brad or Chad"
- Infiniti – "Holiday Shopping"
- Kraft Dinner – "Romantic Dinner"
- Icehouse – "Rain Delay", "Dinner Party", "Support Group"
- Jack Link's Beef Jerky – "Binoculars", "Salt Shaker", "Shaving Cream", "Waterbowl"
- Mercedes-Benz – "Bawling/Penguin", "It's Ready"
- Miracle Whip – "Man's Best Friend"
- Molson Canadian – "Close to You"
- Mountain Dew – "Defeated"
- MSN – "Hotel", "Mr. Snookums", "Name Game", "Quiz", "Rad"
- Nike – "The Roger Effect"
- Nintendo DS – "Race", "Teamwork"
- Nintendo DSi – "Hanging Out"
- Nissan Altima – "Break-Up"
- Obama – "Maverick"
- Pepsi – "Magnetic Attraction"
- Porsche – "Dinner", "Sound"
- Qwest – "Crib"
- Saturn – "Convoy"
- Snickers – "Game", "Road Trip", "Coach", "Cards"
- Southwest Airlines – "Locked Car"
- Subway – "Cupid"
- TAG Body Spray – "Disclaimer Mom", "Fast Acting"
- The St. Paul – "Noah"
- Toyota – "Adrenalitis", "Bed", "Living the Dream", "Rail System"
- Toys "R" Us – "Periscope Up", "Spaceship", "Standoff"
- Twix – "Ideologies", "Merger"
- US West – "Cry"
- Volkswagen – "Dancing", "Hike", "Yoga"
- Washington Mutual – "Julie", "Roy", "Bill B Gone", "Insta-Branch", "Money Shrub", "Teller Porter", "Debra", "Tom", "Jenn", "Paul", "Brandon", "Geoffrey"
- World Championship Wrestling – "HOV", "Couch", "Voodoo"
- Wrigley's – "No Dummy"
- Yahoo! – "Bully", "Garden", "Recall"

== Awards and nominations ==
Year	Award	Category	Title	Result
2024	Cinema for Peace awards	Dove for The Most Valuable Film of the Year	Dumb Money	Nominated
2022	Grammy Awards	Best Compilation Soundtrack for Visual Media	Cruella	Nominated
2002	Directors Guild of America Awards	Outstanding Directorial Achievement in Commercials	Holiday Inn Express' "Kiss Reunion", Citibank's "Delivery Room" and "College Tuition", Ameritech's "Plumber", and SBC's "Welcome Wagon"	Nominated
2003	Directors Guild of America Awards	Outstanding Directorial Achievement in Commercials	Citibank's "Treadmill", Holiday Inn Express' "Snake Bite", Chevrolet's "Cops", SBC's "Coffee Machine", and EDS's "Suki"	Nominated
2006	Directors Guild of America Awards	Outstanding Directorial Achievement in Commercials	Ameriquest's "Surprise Dinner" and "Mini-Mart", and Altoids's "People of Pain" and "Fable of the Fruit Bat"	Won
2010	Directors Guild of America Awards	Outstanding Directorial Achievement in Commercials	Cars.com's "David Abernathy", Guinness' "Slide", and Orbit's "Dusty"	Nominated
2011	Directors Guild of America Awards	Outstanding Directorial Achievement in Commercials	Cars.com's "Timothy Richman", Snickers' "Game" and "Road Trip", and CareerBuilder's "Another Language" and "Casual Friday"	Nominated
2023	Directors Guild of America Awards	Outstanding Directorial Achievement in Commercials	Apple's "Hard Knocks", Jimmy John's' "Problem", and Nissan's "Thrill Driver"	Nominated
2024	Directors Guild of America Awards	Outstanding Directorial Achievement in Commercials	Apple's "Waiting Room"	Nominated
2017	Gotham Awards	Best Feature	I, Tonya	Nominated
2017	Gotham Awards	Audience Award	I, Tonya	Nominated
2022	Primetime Emmy Awards	Outstanding Limited or Anthology Series	Pam & Tommy	Nominated
2026	Primetime Emmy Awards	Outstanding Drama Series	Your Friends & Neighbors	Nominated
2023	Producers Guild of America Awards	Best Limited Series Television	Pam & Tommy	Nominated
