= SBC Telecom =

US telecom corporation

SBC Telecom, Inc.
- Company type: Private (Subsidiary of AT&T)
- Industry: Telecommunications
- Fate: Merged by AT&T
- Headquarters: San Antonio, TX, United States
- Key people: Lee Ann Champion, President
- Products: Local Telephone Service

SBC Telecom, Inc. d/b/a AT&T Small Business is an American CLEC owned by AT&T that offers local telephone service outside the AT&T Bell Operating Company regions. It was formed in 1999 following provisions that required SBC Communications to offer telephone service outside its boundaries in order to get approval to merge with Ameritech.

SBC Telecom is a separate company from Southwestern Bell Telecom, Inc., which was formed in 1984 as a separate subsidiary from Southwestern Bell to sell telephone equipment.
