= Ben Mezrich =

American author (born 1969)

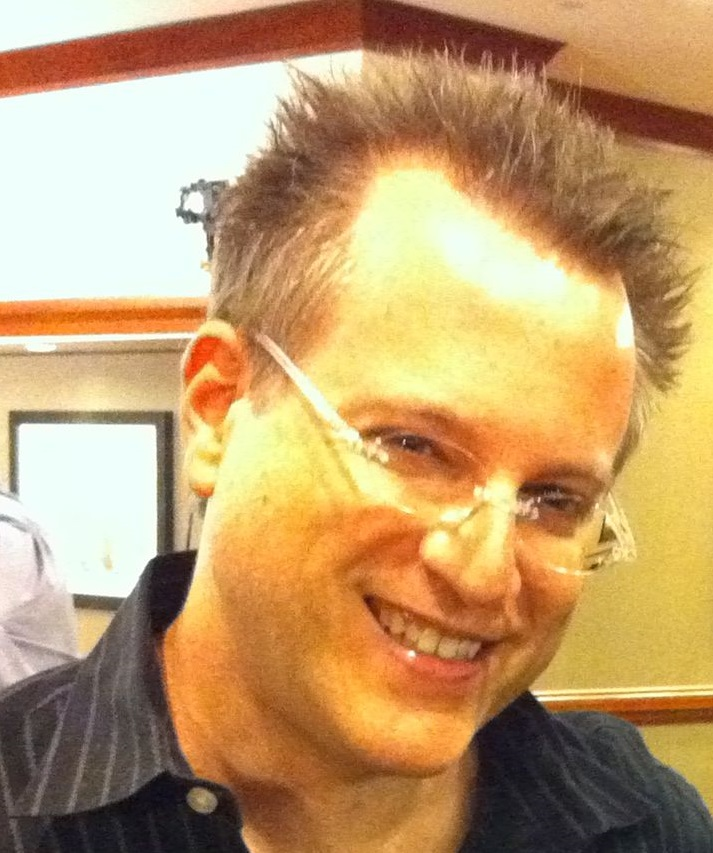
- Author Photo (as of 2024)
- Born: February 7, 1969 (age 57); Princeton, New Jersey, U.S.
- Education: Harvard University (BA)
- Occupation: Writer
- Known for: Bringing Down the House; The Accidental Billionaires; The Antisocial Network
- Spouse: Tonya M. Chen (m. 2006)
- Children: 2

Ben Mezrich (/ˈmɛzrɪk/ MEZ-rik; born February 7, 1969) is an American author. He has written well-known non-fiction books, including The Accidental Billionaires and The Antisocial Network, which have been turned into the films The Social Network and Dumb Money, respectively. Some of his books have been written under the pen-name Holden Scott.

== Early life and education ==
Mezrich was born in Princeton, New Jersey, the son of Molli Newman, a lawyer, and Reuben Mezrich, a chairman of radiology at the University of Maryland School of Medicine. He has two brothers, including Josh Mezrich. He was raised in a Conservative Jewish household, and attended Princeton Day School, in Princeton, New Jersey. He graduated magna cum laude with a degree in Social Studies from Harvard University in 1991.

== Career ==
Mezrich is best known for his first non-fiction work, Bringing Down the House: The Inside Story of Six MIT Students Who Took Vegas for Millions, published in 2003. This book tells the story of a group of students from Massachusetts Institute of Technology who bet on blackjack games using a sophisticated card counting system, earning millions of dollars at casinos in Las Vegas and other gambling centers in the United States and the Caribbean. The story was made into the movie 21, released in 2008. Despite being categorized as non-fiction many of the characters in Bringing Down the House are composite characters and some of the events described have been contested by the people the characters are based on.

In 2004, Mezrich published Ugly Americans: The True Story of the Ivy League Cowboys Who Raided the Asian Markets for Millions. This book recounts the exploits of an American assistant securities trader, John Malcolm.

In 2005, Mezrich published Busting Vegas: The MIT Whiz Kid Who Brought the Casinos to Their Knees, a semi-sequel to Bringing Down the House. The book tells the story of another student involved in a similar Blackjack team, but one that used more advanced techniques than the ones discussed in the first book. As with Bringing Down the House, many of the events depicted in Busting Vegas were later contested by main character Semyon Dukach, who described the book as "only about half true".

In 2007, Mezrich published Rigged: The True Story of a Wall Street Novice who Changed the World of Oil Forever, which recounts the formation of what would eventually become the Dubai Mercantile Exchange by two young visionaries, one in the New York Mercantile Exchange and the other in the Dubai Ministry of Finance.

Mezrich published a new book in July 2009 about Mark Zuckerberg, the founder of Facebook, titled The Accidental Billionaires: The Founding of Facebook, A Tale of Sex, Money, Genius, and Betrayal. It debuted at No. 4 on The New York Times Nonfiction Bestseller List, and No. 1 on The Boston Globe Nonfiction Bestseller List." Aaron Sorkin adapted the book for the screenplay of the film The Social Network, which was released on October 1, 2010. It was directed by David Fincher and stars Jesse Eisenberg as Mark Zuckerberg and Andrew Garfield as Eduardo Saverin. Ten years later, in May 2019, Mezrich published a sequel centering on Cameron and Tyler Winklevoss: Bitcoin Billionaires: A True Story of Genius, Betrayal, and Redemption.

In 2014, Mezrich published Seven Wonders, his first novel since The Carrier in 2001. Seven Wonders is "a fast-moving thriller involving murder, conspiracy, historical mystery, and the Seven Wonders of the World", according to Booklist. Publishers Weekly wrote that "Mezrich has written a rollicking adventure with a fantastic behind-the-scenes tour of some of the world's most intriguing spots."

His 2021 book, The Antisocial Network: The GameStop Short Squeeze and the Ragtag Group of Amateur Traders That Brought Wall Street to Its Knees, was adapted into the film Dumb Money directed by Craig Gillespie.

His 2023 book, Breaking Twitter: Elon Musk and the Most Controversial Corporate Takeover in History, is set to become a limited series.

His 2026 book, Checkmate: Genius, Scandal and the Billion-Dollar Rise of Chess, is set to become a film produced by Nathan Fielder, Emma Stone and Dave McCary.

== Personal life ==
Mezrich has been married to Tonya M. Chen since 2006; they write the Charlie Numbers series together. He lives in Boston and Vermont.

== Works ==
=== Books ===
==== Fiction ====
- Threshold (1996, ISBN 0-446-60521-2)
- Reaper (1998, ISBN 0-06-018751-4)
- Fertile Ground (1999, ISBN 0-06-109798-5)
- The X-Files: Skin (2000, ISBN 0-06-105644-8)
- Skeptic (written under the pen name Holden Scott) (2000, ISBN 0-312-96928-7)
- The Carrier (written under the pen name Holden Scott) (2001, ISBN 0-312-97858-8)
- Seven Wonders (2014, ISBN 978-0762453825)
- The Midnight Ride (2022, ISBN 978-1538754634)
- The Mistress and the Key (2024, ISBN 978-1538769102)

==== Non-fiction ====
- Bringing Down the House: The Inside Story of Six MIT Students Who Took Vegas for Millions (2002, ISBN 0-7432-4999-2)
- Ugly Americans: The True Story of the Ivy League Cowboys Who Raided the Asian Markets for Millions (2004, ISBN 0-06-057500-X)
- Busting Vega$: The MIT Whiz Kid Who Brought the Casinos to Their Knees (2005, ISBN 0-06-057512-3)
- Rigged: The Story of an Ivy League Kid Who Changed the World of Oil, From Wall Street to Dubai (2007, ISBN 0-06-125272-7)
- The Accidental Billionaires: The Founding of Facebook, A Tale of Sex, Money, Genius, and Betrayal (2009, ISBN 0-385-52937-6)
- Sex on the Moon: The Amazing Story Behind the Most Audacious Heist in History (2011, ISBN 0-385-53392-6)
- Straight Flush: The True Story of Six College Friends Who Dealt Their Way to a Billion-Dollar Online Poker Empire—and How It All Came Crashing Down ... (2013, ISBN 0-0622-4009-9)
- Once Upon a Time in Russia: The Rise of the Oligarchs—A True Story of Ambition, Wealth, Betrayal, and Murder (2015, ISBN 978-1476771892)
- The 37th Parallel: The Secret Truth Behind America's UFO Highway (2016, ISBN 9781501135521)
- Woolly: The True Story of the Quest to Revive One of History's Most Iconic Extinct Creatures (2017, ISBN 978-1501135552)
- Bitcoin Billionaires: A True Story of Genius, Betrayal, and Redemption (2019, ISBN 9781250239389)
- The Antisocial Network: The GameStop Short Squeeze and the Ragtag Group of Amateur Traders That Brought Wall Street to Its Knees (2021, Grand Central / Hachette, ISBN 9781538707586)
- Breaking Twitter: Elon Musk and the Most Controversial Corporate Takeover in History (2023, ISBN 978-1538707593)
- Checkmate: Genius, Scandal and the Billion-Dollar Rise of Chess (2026, ISBN 978-1035070459)

==== Juvenile fiction ====
- Bringing Down the Mouse (2014, ISBN 9781442496262)
- Charlie Numbers and the Man in the Moon (2017, ISBN 9781481448475)
- Charlie Numbers and the Woolly Mammoth (2019, ISBN 9781534441002)

=== Other projects ===
Mezrich represented Massachusetts as a contestant in the Sexiest Bachelor in America Pageant on Fox in 2000. Fatal Error is a TBS premiere movie adaptation of his second book, Reaper, starring Antonio Sabato, Jr. and Robert Wagner. Skin was originally written as an X-Files episode. Rigged was optioned by Mark Cuban's company 2929, as was Q, a work of fiction by Mezrich. Ugly Americans has been optioned by Summit, with a screenplay written by Robert Schenkkan, Pulitzer Prize-winning writer of The Quiet American, and also a draft completed by Mezrich himself. Mezrich was the co-host of season 3 of the GSN series World Series of Blackjack and World Blackjack Tour. On August 9, 2016, 20th Century Fox acquired the film adaptation rights to Mezrich's sci-fi novel Wolly, but the rights likely reverted to Mezrich because of Disney's acquisition of 21st Century Fox. Mezrich was a consulting producer for the fifth season of the Showtime series Billions writing the third episode Beg, Bribe, Bully, marking his debut as a television writer. Mezrich's collaborator on Seven Wonders, film producer Beau Flynn, has set a television series adaptation for Amazon Prime Video with Simu Liu attached to both star in and produce the series.
