= The Accidental Billionaires =

Ben Mezrich book about the early years of Facebook

- Cover of the first edition
- Author: Ben Mezrich
- Language: English
- Subject: Facebook
- Genre: Non-fiction
- Publisher: Doubleday
- Publication date: July 14, 2009
- Publication place: United States
- Media type: Print
- Pages: 260
- ISBN: 978-0-385-52937-2
- OCLC: 422928345

The Accidental Billionaires: The Founding of Facebook, a Tale of Sex, Money, Genius, and Betrayal is a 2009 book by Ben Mezrich about the founding of Facebook, adapted by Aaron Sorkin for the 2010 film The Social Network. Co-founder Eduardo Saverin served as Mezrich's main consultant, although he declined to speak with him while the book was being researched. After Zuckerberg and Saverin settled their lawsuit, Saverin broke off contact with the author.

== Sources ==
Ben Mezrich maintains that the book is not a work of fiction despite his narrative style of writing. Some of his sources are his conversations with Facebook co-founder Eduardo Saverin and the court documents made available to him because of "all these college kids suing each other."

== Content ==
The story begins in the weeks that precede the launch of "thefacebook.com" at Harvard. Eduardo Saverin, cast as the protagonist, has befriended Mark Zuckerberg, and both struggle for social acceptance—Saverin by joining a final club, Zuckerberg by creating a website where girls can be ranked according to their looks. Zuckerberg's stunt, though successful, puts him at odds with the Harvard Administrative Board, and has angered numerous campus women's groups as well as individual female students. An article on the incident in The Harvard Crimson is noticed by three Harvard seniors: twin brothers Cameron and Tyler Winklevoss and Divya Narendra, who are trying to launch a Harvard dating site. The trio approaches Zuckerberg, convincing him to join in the venture. Zuckerberg, however, feels their site does not have what he thinks is the right approach and begins developing thefacebook with financial help from Saverin and programming from Zuckerberg's roommates.

Once thefacebook.com is launched, it becomes an immediate hit on campus. After discovering what Zuckerberg has done, the Winklevosses and Narendra are infuriated and seek legal advice from their father's lawyer. The story then chronicles the changing relationship between Saverin and Zuckerberg, who have different visions for thefacebook.

While the first half of the book centers on the Harvard University campus and focuses on college life, the second half centers on the business end of thefacebook and Zuckerberg's move to Silicon Valley. Napster creator Sean Parker inserts himself into Zuckerberg's life, soon becoming a mentor to Zuckerberg who guides him to Silicon Valley venture capitalists and other players in the industry. Saverin, having graduated from Harvard, continues to feel sidelined by Parker, who he feels is not the best influence on Zuckerberg and is replacing him in importance to the advancement of thefacebook. The book does not provide a conclusion since, according to the author, the issues were still being disputed in court.

== Film adaptation ==
Columbia Pictures released a film adaptation of the book in 2010 titled The Social Network. Directed by David Fincher with the screenplay written by Aaron Sorkin, the film stars Jesse Eisenberg, Andrew Garfield, Armie Hammer, and Justin Timberlake. Sorkin's script won the Academy Award for Best Adapted Screenplay.
