= The Social Network =

2010 film by David Fincher

- Theatrical release poster
- Directed by: David Fincher
- Screenplay by: Aaron Sorkin
- Based on: The Accidental Billionaires by Ben Mezrich
- Produced by: Scott Rudin; Dana Brunetti; Michael De Luca; Ceán Chaffin
- Starring: Jesse Eisenberg; Andrew Garfield; Justin Timberlake; Armie Hammer; Max Minghella
- Cinematography: Jeff Cronenweth
- Edited by: Angus Wall; Kirk Baxter
- Music by: Trent Reznor; Atticus Ross
- Production companies: Columbia Pictures; Relativity Media; Scott Rudin Productions; Michael De Luca Productions; Trigger Street Productions
- Distributed by: Sony Pictures Releasing
- Release dates: September 24, 2010 (NYFF); October 1, 2010 (United States)
- Running time: 120 minutes
- Country: United States
- Language: English
- Budget: $40 million
- Box office: $225 million

The Social Network is a 2010 American biographical drama film directed by David Fincher and written by Aaron Sorkin. Based on the 2009 book The Accidental Billionaires by Ben Mezrich, the film portrays the founding of the social networking website Facebook. It stars Jesse Eisenberg as Facebook CEO Mark Zuckerberg, with Andrew Garfield as co-founder Eduardo Saverin, Justin Timberlake as Sean Parker, Armie Hammer as Cameron and Tyler Winklevoss, and Max Minghella as Divya Narendra. Neither Zuckerberg nor any other Facebook staff were involved with the project, although Saverin was a consultant for Mezrich's book.

Production began when Sorkin signed on to write the screenplay. Principal photography began in October 2009 in Cambridge, Massachusetts, and lasted until November. Additional scenes were shot in California, in the cities of Los Angeles and Pasadena. Trent Reznor and Atticus Ross of Nine Inch Nails composed the film's award-winning score, which was released on September 28, 2010.

The film premiered at the New York Film Festival on September 24, 2010, and was released theatrically in the United States on October 1, by Sony Pictures Releasing through its Columbia Pictures label. A major commercial success, the film grossed $225 million on a $40 million budget and was widely acclaimed by critics. It was named one of the best films of the year by 447 critics, and named the best by 110 critics, the most of any film that year. The Social Network was also chosen by the National Board of Review as the best film of 2010. At the 83rd Academy Awards, it received eight nominations, including for Best Picture, Best Director, and Best Actor for Eisenberg, and won for Best Adapted Screenplay, Best Original Score, and Best Film Editing. The film also received awards for Best Motion Picture – Drama, Best Director, Best Screenplay, and Best Original Score at the 68th Golden Globe Awards.

The Social Network has maintained a strong reputation since its initial release, and is commonly ranked by critics as one of the best films of the 2010s and 21st century. The Writers Guild of America ranked Sorkin's screenplay the third greatest of the 21st century. The factual accuracy is, however, largely contested. In 2024, the film was selected for preservation in the United States National Film Registry by the Library of Congress as being "culturally, historically, or aesthetically significant".

A sequel titled The Social Reckoning, with Sorkin returning to write and direct but recasting Eisenberg with Jeremy Strong as Zuckerberg, released on October 9, 2026.

== Plot ==
In intercut frame stories, two ongoing depositions play out: in one, Mark Zuckerberg is being sued by his former friend Eduardo Saverin, and in the other, he is sued by twins Cameron and Tyler Winklevoss.

On October 28, 2003, 19-year-old Zuckerberg, a Harvard University sophomore, is dumped by his girlfriend, Erica Albright. Returning to his dorm, Zuckerberg writes an insulting post about her on his LiveJournal blog. Zuckerberg creates a campus website called Facemash by hacking and downloading photos of female students from house face books, then allowing site visitors to rate their attractiveness. After traffic to the site crashes parts of Harvard's computer network, Zuckerberg is given six months of academic probation.

Facemash's popularity attracts the attention of the Winklevoss twins and their business partner Divya Narendra. The trio invites Zuckerberg to work on Harvard Connection, a dating-focused social network exclusive to Harvard students. Soon after, Zuckerberg approaches Saverin with an idea for "TheFacebook", a social networking website that would be exclusive to Ivy League students. As its CFO, Saverin provides $1,000 in seed funding so Zuckerberg can build the website, which quickly becomes popular. When they learn about TheFacebook, the Winklevoss twins and Narendra are incensed, believing Zuckerberg stole their idea and misled them by stalling development on the Harvard Connection. They raise their complaint with Harvard President Larry Summers, who dismisses it and sees no value in disciplining TheFacebook or Zuckerberg.

Saverin and Zuckerberg meet fellow student Christy Lee, who asks them to "Facebook me," a phrase that impresses them. As TheFacebook grows in popularity, Zuckerberg expands the network to Yale, Columbia, and Stanford. Saverin begins dating Lee, who arranges a meeting between him and Zuckerberg and Napster co-founder Sean Parker. Parker presents a "billion-dollar" vision for the company, impressing Zuckerberg. Saverin dismisses Parker as paranoid and delusional, except for his suggestion to rename TheFacebook to Facebook. Saverin deposits $18,000 into a new account as Zuckerberg relocates the company to Palo Alto on Parker's advice; Saverin remains in New York to work on business development while breaking up with Lee. Parker later moves into the house Zuckerberg uses as a base of operations and becomes more involved with the company, much to Saverin's annoyance.

After narrowly losing in the 2004 Henley Royal Regatta for Harvard against the Hollandia Roeiclub in United Kingdom, the Winklevoss twins discover that, through Parker, Facebook has expanded to Europe with Oxford, Cambridge and LSE, and decide to sue the company for intellectual property theft. Meanwhile, Saverin objects to Parker's decision-making at Facebook and freezes the company's bank account during the dispute, but relents when Zuckerberg reveals that they have secured $500,000 from angel investor Peter Thiel.

Saverin is invited to the company's new headquarters in San Francisco on the pretense of attending a business meeting and "millionth user party," but is enraged when he discovers that the new investment deal dilutes his share of Facebook from 34% to 0.03%, without diluting the ownership percentage of any other owner. He is also removed from the masthead as co-founder and CFO. He confronts Zuckerberg and Parker, vowing to sue as security removes him from the building. Shortly after, Parker is apprehended for cocaine possession with a minor at a party celebrating one million users. He attempts to blame Saverin, prompting Zuckerberg to cut ties with him.

Marylin Delpy, a junior lawyer for Zuckerberg, tells Zuckerberg they will settle with Saverin because the sordid details of Facebook's founding and Zuckerberg's callous attitude will make him unlikable to a jury. Alone, Zuckerberg sends Albright a Facebook friend request and repeatedly refreshes the page. Closing text reveals both cases were settled out of court, and Zuckerberg became the world's youngest billionaire.

== Cast ==
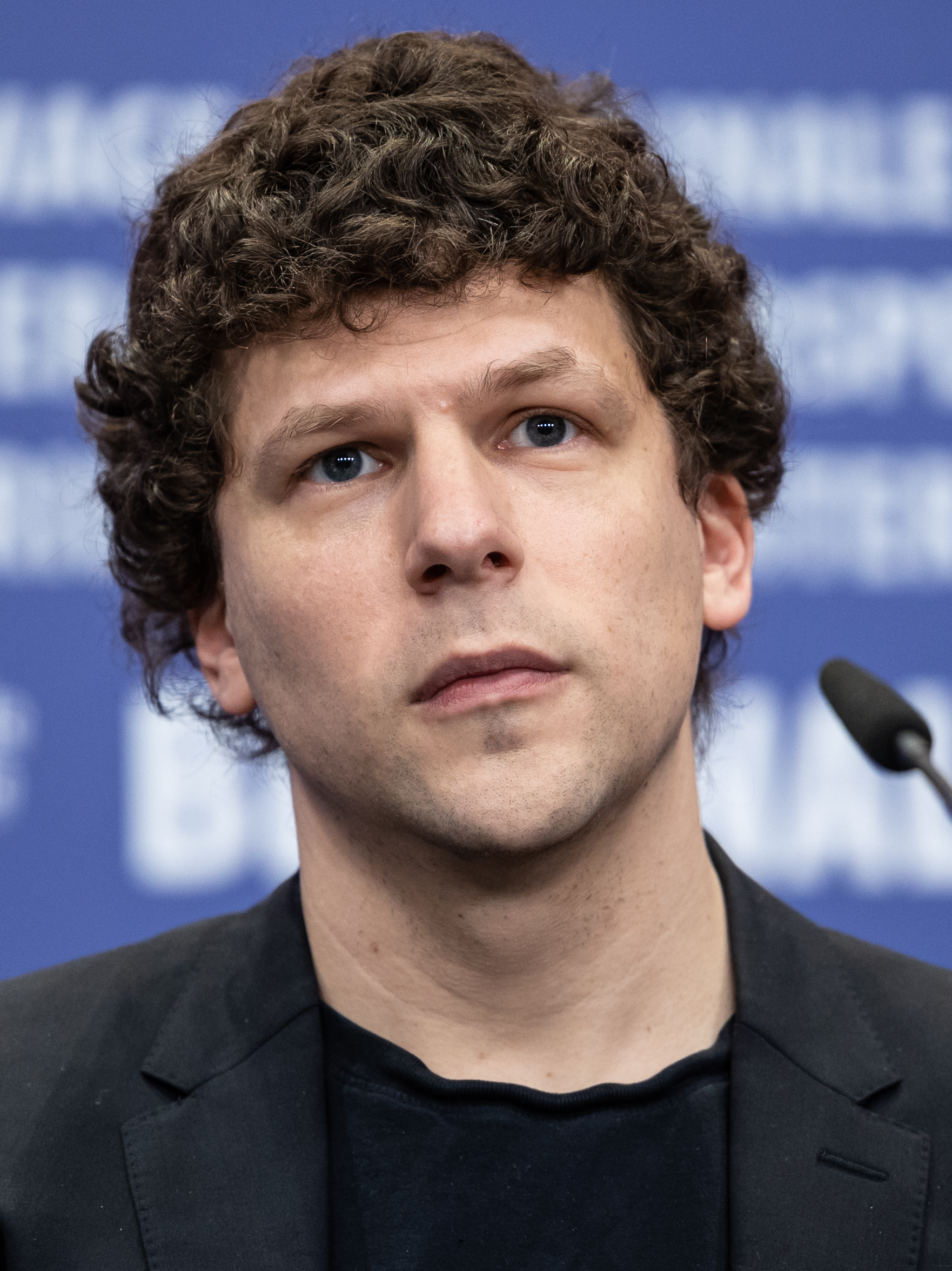
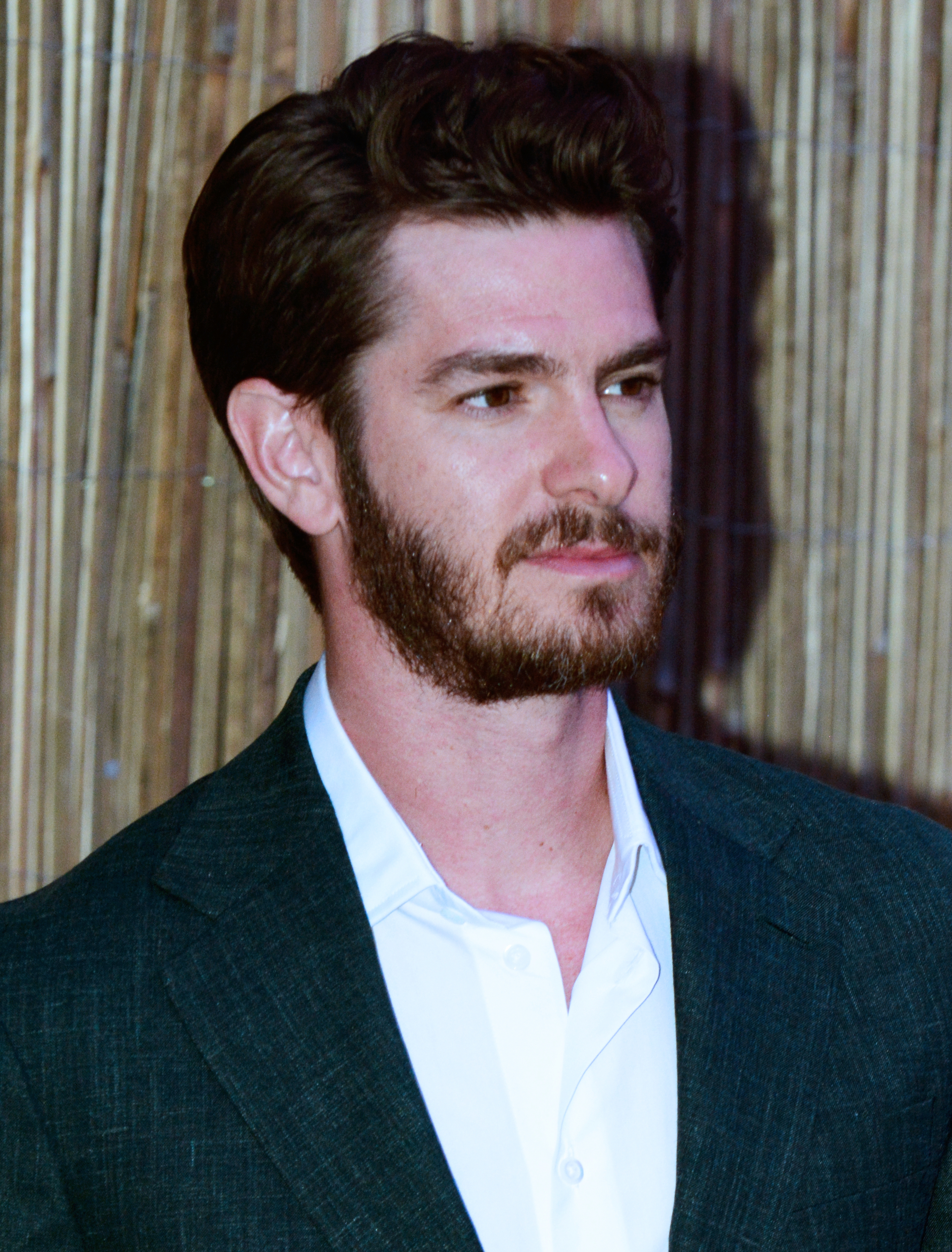
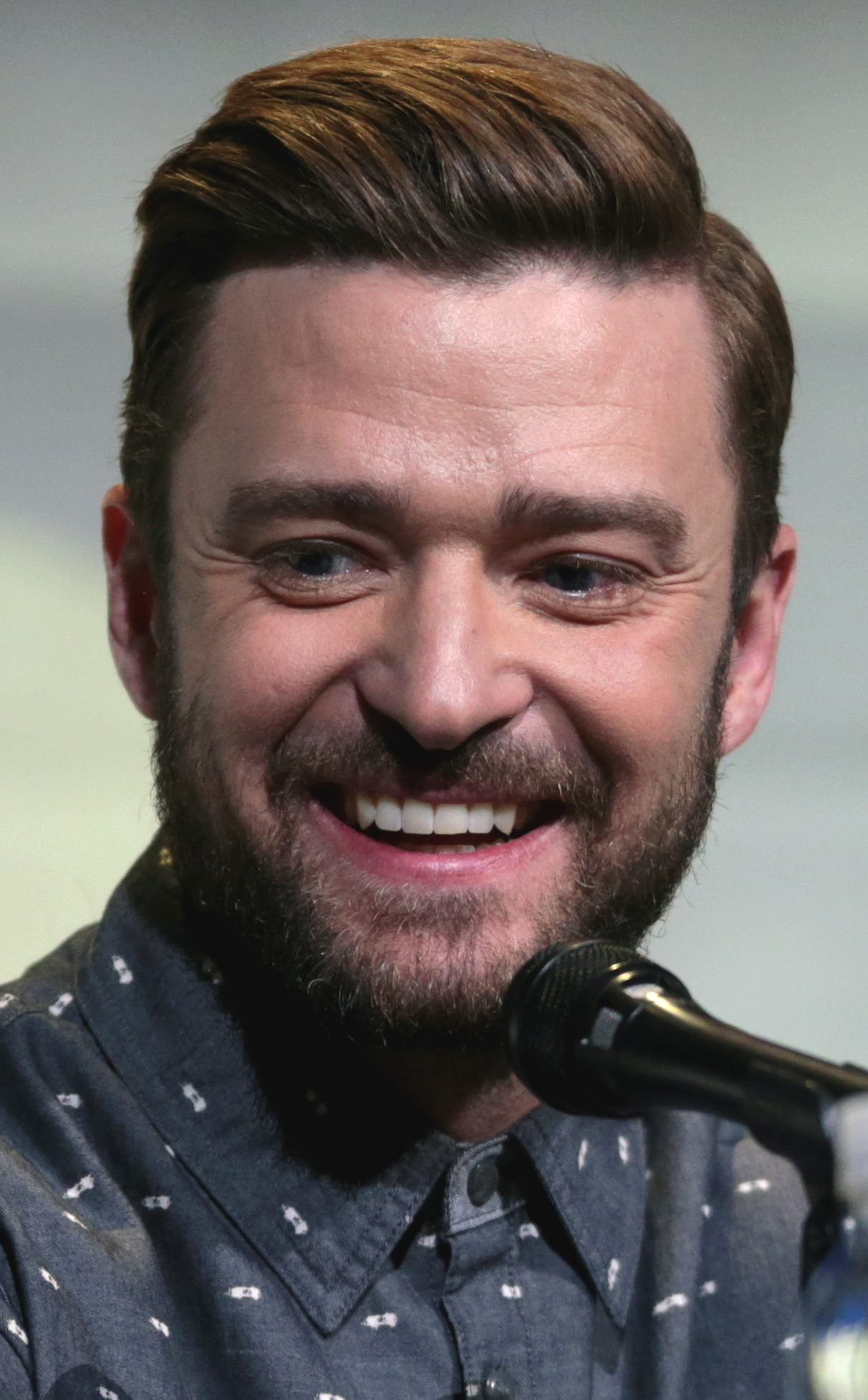
(L to R) Jesse Eisenberg, Andrew Garfield (both pictured in 2023), and Justin Timberlake (2016)
- Jesse Eisenberg as Mark Zuckerberg
- Andrew Garfield as Eduardo Saverin
- Justin Timberlake as Sean Parker
- Armie Hammer as Cameron and Tyler Winklevoss
- Max Minghella as Divya Narendra
- Brenda Song as Christy Lee
- Rashida Jones as Marylin Delpy
- John Getz as Sy
- David Selby as Gage
- Denise Grayson as Gretchen
- Douglas Urbanski as Larry Summers
- Rooney Mara as Erica Albright
- Joseph Mazzello as Dustin Moskovitz
- Dustin Fitzsimons as The Phoenix – S K Club President
- Wallace Langham as Peter Thiel
- Patrick Mapel as Chris Hughes
- Dakota Johnson as Amelia Ritter
- Malese Jow as Alice Cantwel
- Trevor Wright as B.U. Guy in Bra
- Shelby Young as K.C.
- Aaron Sorkin as Ad Executive
- Steve Sires as Bill Gates
- Caleb Landry Jones as a fraternity brother

Josh Pence is the body double for Hammer, whose likeness was digitally imposed onto Pence's body. He is listed in the end credits as playing Tyler Winklevoss alongside Hammer, though he also shot scenes as Cameron. He also appears in a cameo role as the man being detoured from the bathroom by Zuckerberg and Saverin.

== Production ==
=== Screenplay ===
Screenwriter Aaron Sorkin said, "What attracted me to [the film project] had nothing to do with Facebook. The invention itself is as modern as it gets, but the story is as old as storytelling; the themes of friendship, loyalty, jealousy, class and power". He said he read an unfinished draft of Ben Mezrich's The Accidental Billionaires when the publisher began "shopping it around" for a film adaptation. Sorkin added, "I was reading it and somewhere on page three I said yes. It was the fastest I said yes to anything ... They wanted me to start right away. Ben and I were kind of doing our research at the same time, sort of along parallel lines". In August 2008, Sorkin started a Facebook group for research purposes while he was working on the film. "I've just agreed to write a movie for Sony and producer Scott Rudin about how Facebook was invented. I figured a good first step in my preparation would be finding out what Facebook is, so I've started this page." He emphasized the role of the competing narratives at a Q&A screening hosted by Myspace: "If the same story was behind the invention of MySpace or Friendster, I would have written that. Two separate lawsuits were brought against Facebook at roughly the same time. Rather than pick one and decide that's the truth, or pick one and say that's the sexist [sic], I like the idea that there are three conflicting stories."

According to Sorkin, Mezrich did not send him material from his book as he wrote it: "Two or three times we'd get together. I'd go to Boston, or we'd meet in New York and kind of compare notes and share information, but I didn't see the book until he was done with it. By the time I saw the book, I was probably 80 percent done with the screenplay." Sorkin elaborated:

There's a lot of available research, and I also did a lot of first person research with a number of the people that were involved in the story. I can't go too deeply into that because most of the people did it on the condition of anonymity, but what I found was that two lawsuits were brought against Facebook at roughly the same time, that the defendant, plaintiffs, witnesses all came into a deposition room and swore under oath, and three different versions of the story were told. Instead of choosing one and deciding that's the truest one or choosing one and deciding that's the juiciest one, I decided to dramatize the idea that there were three different versions of the story being told. That's how I came up with the structure of the deposition room.

=== Casting ===
Casting began in mid-2009, with Jesse Eisenberg, Justin Timberlake, and Andrew Garfield announced to star. Garfield originally auditioned to play Mark Zuckerberg and was told the role was "as good as [his]", but director David Fincher cast him as Eduardo Saverin instead after viewing Eisenberg's audition. Jonah Hill was in contention for Timberlake's role, but Fincher passed on him. In October 2009, Brenda Song, Rooney Mara, Armie Hammer, Shelby Young, and Josh Pence were cast. Max Minghella and Dakota Johnson were also confirmed. In a 2009 interview with The Baltimore Sun, Eisenberg said, "Even though I've gotten to be in some wonderful movies, this character seems so much more overtly insensitive in so many ways that seem more real to me in the best way. I don't often get cast as insensitive people, so it feels very comfortable: fresh and exciting, as if you never have to worry about the audience. Not that I worry about the audience anyway – it should be just the furthest thing from your mind. The Social Network is the biggest relief I've ever had in a movie". In 2010, it was announced that Rashida Jones would appear as Marylin Delpy.

=== Filming ===
Principal photography began in October 2009 in Cambridge, Massachusetts. Scenes were filmed around the campuses of two Massachusetts prep schools, Phillips Academy and Milton Academy. Additional scenes were filmed on the campus of Wheelock College, which was set up to be Harvard's campus, as well as locations on and around the campus of Johns Hopkins University in Baltimore (Harvard has turned down most requests for on-location filming ever since the filming of Love Story (1970), which caused significant physical damage to trees on campus.) Filming took place on the Keyser and Wyman quadrangles in the Homewood campus of Johns Hopkins University from November 2–4, which also doubled for Harvard in the film. The first scene in the film, where Zuckerberg is with his girlfriend, took 99 takes to finish. The film was shot on the Red One digital cinema camera. The rowing scenes with the Winklevoss brothers were filmed at Community Rowing Inc. in Newton, Massachusetts and at the Henley Royal Regatta; miniature faking process was used in a sequence showing a rowing event at the latter. Although a significant portion of the latter half of the film is set in Silicon Valley, the filmmakers opted to shoot those scenes in Los Angeles and Pasadena.

Eisenberg had intended to meet Zuckerberg during production, even deciding to drive to Facebook's offices but producers would not allow it for "legal reasons".

Armie Hammer, who portrayed the Winklevoss twins, acted alongside body double Josh Pence while his scenes were filmed. His face was later digitally grafted onto Pence's face during post-production, while other scenes used split-screen photography. Pence was concerned about having no face time during the role, but after considerable musing thought of the role as a "no-brainer". He also appears in a cameo role elsewhere in the film. Hammer states that director David Fincher "likes to push himself and likes to push technology" and is "one of the most technologically minded guys I've ever seen." This included sending the actors to "twin boot camp" for 10 months to learn everything about the Winklevosses.

==== Rowing production ====
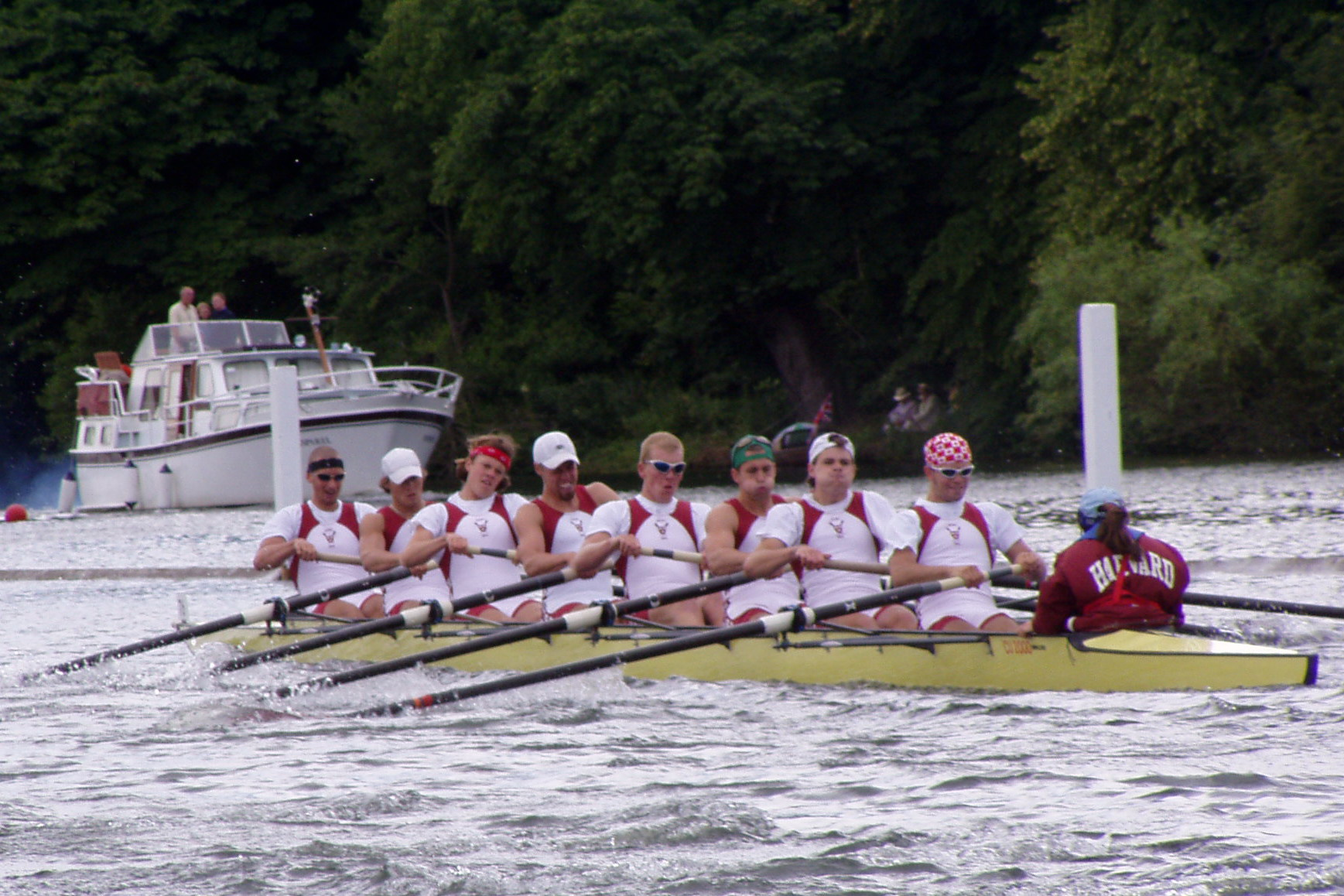
Harvard's rowing tradition is depicted in the film.

Community Rowing Inc. held a casting call and a tryout for 20 rowing extras; some were graduates from Harvard, Northeastern University, Boston University, George Washington University, and Trinity College, as well as local club rowers from Union Boat Club and Riverside Boat Club. None of the cast rowing extras for the Henley Royal Regatta racing scene appeared in the film; filming for the race was originally planned to take place in Los Angeles, but Fincher decided to film in England during production.

David Fincher hired Loyola Marymount coach Dawn Reagan to help train Josh Pence and Armie Hammer. While Hammer was new to the sport, Pence rowed previously at Dartmouth College.

The indoor rowing scene was filmed at Boston University's indoor rowing tanks. All of BU's blue oars in the scene were repainted to Harvard's crimson color for filming. Dan Boyne was the official rowing consultant in the US and the UK.

=== Soundtrack ===
On June 1, 2010, it was announced that Trent Reznor and Atticus Ross would score the film. The soundtrack was released September 28 in various formats under the Null Corporation label. Leading up to the release of the soundtrack, a free five-track EP was made available for download. The White Stripes' song "Ball and Biscuit" can be heard in the opening of the film and the Beatles' song "Baby, You're a Rich Man" concludes the film. Neither song appears on the soundtrack album. Reznor and Ross won the award for Best Original Score at the 2011 Golden Globe Awards, as well as the 2011 Academy Award for Best Original Score.

== Marketing ==
=== Poster ===
The first theatrical poster, designed by Neil Kellerhouse, was released on June 18, 2010. As Kellerhouse previously designed posters for the films of Steven Soderbergh, director David Fincher's friend, he was contacted by Ceán Chaffin in late 2009 to work on the key art for The Social Network, which had to make sole use of one approved photograph, that of Eisenberg's head. As he wanted to highlight the tremendous drama that went with Mark Zuckerberg's success, Kellerhouse thought of the tagline "You don't get to 300 million friends without making a few enemies"; he would later adjust the line to "500 million friends" in anticipation of Facebook reaching 500 million users by the film's release date. Kellerhouse's poster has been praised for its unique and "striking" design, and alongside his work for the film I'm Still Here, has since become influential in film marketing; posters for The King's Speech and The Armstrong Lie strongly evoked the poster's design format.

=== Trailers ===
The film's first teaser trailer was released on June 25, 2010. The second teaser was released on July 8. The full length theatrical trailer debuted on July 16, 2010, which plays an edited version of the song "Creep", originally by Radiohead, covered by the Belgian choir group Scala & Kolacny Brothers. The theatrical trailer, put together by Mark Woollen & Associates, won the Grand Key Art award at the 2011 Key Art Awards, sponsored by The Hollywood Reporter, and was also featured on The Film Informant's Perfect 10 Trailers in 2010.

== Release ==
The Social Network premiered at the New York Film Festival on September 24, 2010.

=== Box office ===
The film was released in theaters in the United States on the weekend of October 1–3, 2010. It debuted at No. 1, grossing $22.4 million in 2,771 theaters. The film retained the top spot in its second weekend, dropping only 31.2%, breaking Inception's 32.0% record as the smallest second weekend drop for any number-one film of 2010, while being the third-smallest overall behind Secretariat's 25.1% drop and Tooth Fairy's 28.6% drop. At the end of its theatrical run, the film grossed $97 million in the United States and $128 million in other territories for a worldwide total of $225 million.

=== Critical reception ===
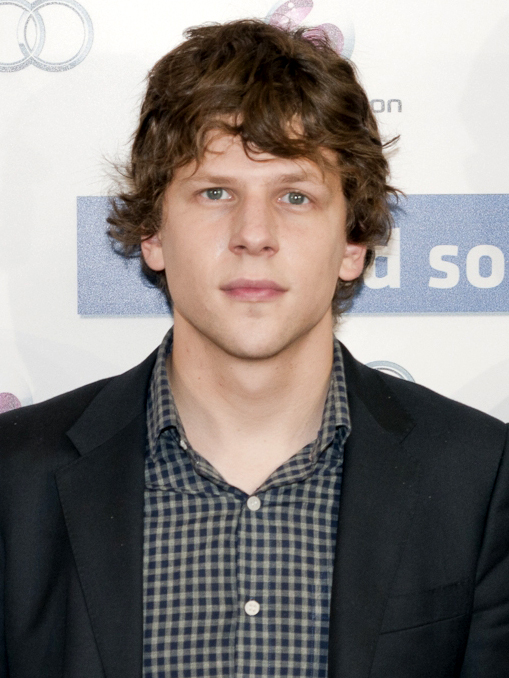
Jesse Eisenberg received critical acclaim for his performance as Mark Zuckerberg, earning an Academy Award nomination for Best Actor.

The Social Network received widespread critical acclaim. On review aggregator Rotten Tomatoes, the film has an approval rating of 96% based on 335 reviews, with an average rating of 9/10. The website's critical consensus reads, "Impeccably scripted, beautifully directed, and filled with fine performances, The Social Network is a riveting, ambitious example of modern filmmaking at its finest." On Metacritic, the film has a weighted average score of 95 out of 100, based on 42 critics, indicating "universal acclaim". Audiences polled by CinemaScore gave the film an average grade of "B+" on an A+ to F scale.

From The Guardian, Peter Bradshaw gave the film four stars, praising David Fincher's directing as the "right intensity and claustrophobia for a story that takes place largely in a stupefyingly male environment at Harvard University in 2003". In her review for The Verge, Kaitlyn Tiffany wrote positive comments on Aaron Sorkin's screenplay, writing that his "reflex for writing witty, whiny men with outsized intellect and poorly disguised narcissism serves as an advantage instead of a handicap." The film's editing by Kirk Baxter and Angus Wall was also lauded by critics, leading to their win of the Academy Award for Best Film Editing. Additionally, the film's score received positive commentary, with some reviewers stating that it was "a persistent source of simmering tension in the movie", and a "masterpiece".

Roger Ebert of the Chicago Sun-Times, giving it four stars and naming it the best film of the year, wrote: "David Fincher's film has the rare quality of being not only as smart as its brilliant hero, but in the same way. It is cocksure, impatient, cold, exciting and instinctively perceptive." Peter Travers of Rolling Stone gave the film his first full four-star rating of the year and said: "The Social Network is the movie of the year. But Fincher and Sorkin triumph by taking it further. Lacing their scathing wit with an aching sadness, they define the dark irony of the past decade." The Harvard Crimson review called it "flawless" and gave it five stars.

Joe Morgenstern in The Wall Street Journal praised the film as exhilarating but noted: "The biographical part takes liberties with its subject. Aaron Sorkin based his screenplay on ... The Accidental Billionaires, so everything that's seen isn't necessarily to be believed." Nathan Heller of Slate wrote a negative review of the film, describing it as "rote and deeply mediocre" as well as "maddeningly generic", and said that, "Sorkin and Fincher's 2003 Harvard is a citadel of old money, regatta blazers, and (if I am not misreading the implication here) a Jewish underclass striving beneath the heel of a WASP-centric, socially draconian culture ... to get the university this wrong in this movie is no small matter."

The Social Network appeared on 78 film critics' top-ten lists of the best films of 2010, based on Metacritic's aggregation. Out of the critics, 22 ranked the film first, and 12 ranked the film second. Out of the films of 2010, The Social Network appeared on the most top-ten lists. In 2016, The Social Network was voted the 27th-best film of the 21st century by the BBC, as voted on by 177 film critics from around the world.

In 2018, IndieWire writers ranked the script the fourth best American screenplay of the 21st century, with Michael Nordine arguing that "everything came together nearly perfectly on the film, thanks in large part to Aaron Sorkin's Oscar-winning screenplay. Its finds the loquacious scribe at his best, with all the verbal takedowns ... and rapid-fire back-and-forths we've come to expect (and, more often than not, love) from him. Sorkin's portrayal of Mark Zuckerberg was hardly flattering, but recent headlines suggest it may have been too sympathetic."

==== Top ten lists ====
The Social Network appeared on over 70 critics' top ten lists of the best films of 2010. Over a dozen publications ranked the film first in their lists.

- 1st – Peter Travers, Rolling Stone
- 1st – Roger Ebert, Chicago Sun-Times
- 1st – Christy Lemire, Associated Press
- 1st – Andrea Grunvall, Chicago Reader
- 1st – Owen Gleiberman and Lisa Schwarzbaum, Entertainment Weekly
- 1st – Betsy Sharkey and Kenneth Turan, Los Angeles Times
- 1st – Rene Rodriguez, Miami Herald
- 1st – Stephen Holden, The New York Times
- 1st – David Denby, The New Yorker
- 1st – Now Magazine
- 1st – Tim Robey, Telegraph
- 1st – Joshua Rothkopf, Time Out New York
- 1st – Ann Hornaday, Washington Post
- 1st – Joe Morgenstern, Wall Street Journal
- 2nd – Richard Brody, The New Yorker
- 2nd – Glenn Kenny, MSN Movies
- 2nd – Ty Burr, The Boston Globe
- 2nd – Tasha Robinson, The A.V. Club
- 2nd – Phillip French, The Observer
- 2nd – Todd McCarthy & Kirk Honeycutt The Hollywood Reporter
- 3rd – Richard Roeper, Chicago Sun-Times
- 3rd – Stephanie Zacharek, Movieline
- 3rd – Anne Thompson, Indiewire
- 3rd – Keith Phipps & Noel Murray The A.V. Club
- 4th – Scott Tobias, The A.V. Club
- 4th – Chris Vogner, Dallas Morning News
- 4th – Joe Neumaier & Elizabeth Weitzman, New York Daily News
- 5th – Richard Corliss, Time
- 5th – David Ehrenstein, L.A. Weekly
- 7th – Nathan Rabin, The A.V. Club
- 7th – Claudia Puig, USA Today
- 7th – Mick LaSalle, San Francisco Chronicle
- 8th – David Ansen, Newsweek
- 9th – James Berardinelli, Reelviews
- Top 10 (listed alphabetically, not ranked) – Wesley Morris, The Boston Globe
- Top 10 (listed alphabetically, not ranked) – Steven Rea, Philadelphia Inquirer
- Top 10 (listed alphabetically, not ranked) – Dana Stevens, Slate

=== Home media ===
The Social Network was released on DVD and Blu-ray on January 11, 2011 by Sony Pictures Home Entertainment. In its first week of release, DVD sales totaled $13,470,305 and it was the number-one-sold DVD of the week. The DVD includes an audio commentary with director David Fincher, and a second commentary with writer Aaron Sorkin and the cast. The Blu-ray and two-disc DVD releases include the commentaries, along with a feature-length documentary, How Did They Ever Make a Movie of Facebook?, featurettes, Angus Wall, Kirk Baxter and Ren Klyce on Post, Trent Reznor, Atticus Ross and David Fincher on the Score, In the Hall of the Mountain King: Reznor's First Draft, Swarmatron, Jeff Cronenweth and David Fincher on the Visuals, and a Ruby Skye VIP Room: Multi-Angle Scene Breakdown feature. The film was released on Ultra HD Blu-ray in October 2021 as part of the Columbia Classics 4K Ultra HD Collection (Volume 2), featuring a new Dolby Atmos mix and upscaled Dolby Vision/HDR10 transfer from the film's 2K master.

== Accolades ==
The Social Network won the Best Motion Picture – Drama Golden Globe at the 68th Golden Globe Awards on January 16, 2011. The film also won the awards for Best Director, Best Screenplay, and Best Original Score, making it the film with the most wins of the night.

The film was nominated for seven British Academy Film Awards, including Best Film, Best Actor in a Leading Role (Eisenberg), Best Actor in a Supporting Role (Garfield), and Rising Star Award (Garfield). It won three for Best Editing, Adapted Screenplay, and Best Direction on February 13, 2011.

The Social Network was nominated for eight Academy Awards: Best Picture, Best Actor, Best Cinematography, Best Director, Best Film Editing, Best Original Score, Best Sound Mixing, and Best Adapted Screenplay. Of these, it won three: Best Adapted Screenplay, Best Original Score, and Best Film Editing at the 83rd Academy Awards on February 27, 2011.

The film won Best Picture from the National Board of Review, National Society of Film Critics, New York Film Critics Circle, and Los Angeles Film Critics Association, making it only the third film in history—after Schindler's List (1993) and L.A. Confidential (1997)—to sweep the "Big Four" critics awards. The film also won the "Hollywood Ensemble Award" from the Hollywood Film Awards.

== Historical accuracy ==
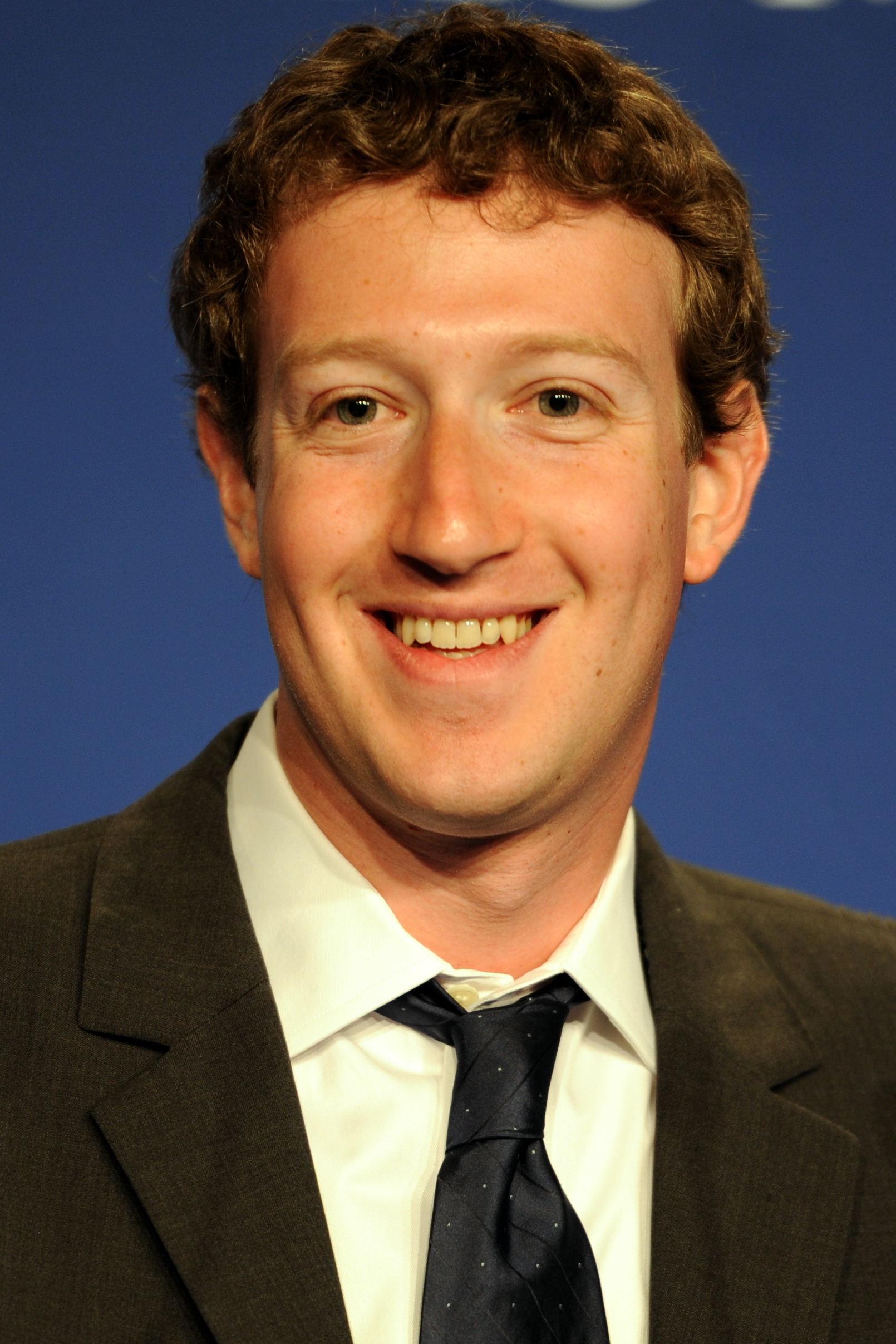
Mark Zuckerberg expressed his dissatisfaction with a film being made about him and noted that much of the plot was not factual.

The script was leaked online in July 2009. In November 2009, executive producer Kevin Spacey said, "The Social Network is probably going to be a lot funnier than people might expect it to be." The Cardinal Courier stated that the film was about "greed, obsession, unpredictability and sex" and asked, "Although there are over 500 million Facebook users, does this mean Facebook can become a profitable blockbuster movie?"

At the D8 conference hosted by D: All Things Digital on June 2, 2010, host Kara Swisher told Zuckerberg she knew he was not happy with The Social Network being based on him, to which he replied, "I just wished that nobody made a movie of me while I was still alive." Zuckerberg stated to Oprah Winfrey that the drama and partying of the film is mostly fiction, and that he had spent most of the past six years focusing, working hard, and coding Facebook. Speaking to an audience at Stanford University, Zuckerberg said that instead of making Facebook to "get girls", he made it because he enjoyed "building things". At a forum at Facebook's headquarters in 2014, he added that he was dating his now wife Priscilla Chan at the time. He added that the film accurately depicted his wardrobe, saying, "It's interesting the stuff that they focused on getting right—like every single shirt and fleece they had in that movie is actually a shirt or fleece that I own."

Facebook co-founder Dustin Moskovitz called the film a "dramatization of history ... it is interesting to see my past rewritten in a way that emphasizes things that didn't matter, (like the Winklevosses, who I've still never even met and had no part in the work we did to create the site over the past 6 years) and leaves out things that really did (like the many other people in our lives at the time, who supported us in innumerable ways)". According to Moskovitz:

A lot of exciting things happened in 2004, but mostly we just worked a lot and stressed out about things; the version in the trailer seems a lot more exciting, so I'm just going to choose to remember that we drank ourselves silly and had a lot of sex with coeds. ... The plot of the book/script unabashedly attacked [Zuckerberg], but I actually felt like a lot of his positive qualities come out truthfully in the trailer (soundtrack aside). At the end of the day, they cannot help but portray him as the driven, forward-thinking genius that he is.

Co-founder Eduardo Saverin said "the movie was clearly intended to be entertainment and not a fact-based documentary". Sean Parker described the film and its depiction of him as "a morally reprehensible human being" as "a complete work of fiction", and claimed that he remained friends with Saverin. Sorkin said, "I don't want my fidelity to be to the truth; I want it to be to storytelling. What is the big deal about accuracy purely for accuracy's sake, and can we not have the true be the enemy of the good?"

Journalist Jeff Jarvis acknowledged the film was "well-crafted" but called it "the anti-social movie", objecting to Sorkin's decision to change various events and characters for dramatic effect, and dismissing it as "the story that those who resist the change society is undergoing want to see". Technology broadcaster Leo Laporte concurred, calling the film "anti-geek and misogynistic". Sorkin responded to these allegations by saying, "I was writing about a very angry and deeply misogynistic group of people".

Andrew Clark of The Guardian wrote that "there's something insidious about this genre of [docudrama] scriptwriting", wondering if "a 26-year-old businessman really deserves to have his name dragged through the mud in a murky mixture of fact and imagination for the general entertainment of the movie-viewing public?" Clark added, "I'm not sure whether Mark Zuckerberg is a punk, a genius or both. But I won't be seeing The Social Network to find out."

Mashable founder and CEO Pete Cashmore, blogging for CNN, said: "If the Facebook founder [Zuckerberg] is concerned about being represented as anything but a genius with an industrious work ethic, he can breathe a sigh of relief." Jessi Hempel, a technology writer for Fortune who says she has known Zuckerberg "for a long time", wrote of the film:

The real-life Zuckerberg was maniacally focused on building a web site that could potentially connect everyone on the planet ... By contrast, in the film he seems more obsessed with achieving the largesse that bad boy Sean Parker, an original Napster founder, portrays when he arrives to meet Zuckerberg at a New York restaurant.

Harvard Law School professor Lawrence Lessig wrote in The New Republic that Sorkin's screenplay does not acknowledge the "real villain" of the story:

The total and absolute absurdity of the world where the engines of a federal lawsuit get cranked up to adjudicate the hurt feelings (because "our idea was stolen!") of entitled Harvard undergraduates is completely missed by Sorkin. We can't know enough from the film to know whether there was actually any substantial legal claim here. Sorkin has been upfront about the fact that there are fabrications aplenty lacing the story. But from the story as told, we certainly know enough to know that any legal system that would allow these kids to extort $65 million from the most successful business this century should be ashamed of itself. Did Zuckerberg breach his contract? Maybe, for which the damages are more like $650, not $65 million. Did he steal a trade secret? Absolutely not. Did he steal any other "property"? Absolutely not—the code for Facebook was his, and the "idea" of a social network is not a patent. It wasn't justice that gave the twins $65 million; it was the fear of a random and inefficient system of law. That system is a tax on innovation and creativity. That tax is the real villain here, not the innovator it burdened.

In an onstage discussion with Huffington Post co-founder Arianna Huffington in 2010, Facebook's chief operating officer, Sheryl Sandberg, said the film was "very Hollywood" and mainly "fiction". She said that "in real life, [Zuckerberg] was just sitting around with his friends in front of his computer, ordering pizza. Who wants to go see that for two hours?" HarvardConnection co-founder Divya Narendra said that he was surprised to see himself portrayed by the non-Indian actor Max Minghella, but said he did a "good job in pushing the dialogue forward and creating a sense of urgency in what was a very frustrating period".

== Legacy ==
=== Preliminary impact ===
Since its release, The Social Network has inspired involvement in start-ups and social media. Bob Lefsetz has stated that: "watching this movie makes you want to run from the theatre, grab your laptop and build your own empire," noting that The Social Network has helped fuel an emerging perception that "techies have become the new rock stars." This has led Dave Knox to comment that: "fifteen years from now we might just look back and realize this movie inspired our next great generation of entrepreneurs." After seeing the movie, Zuckerberg was quoted as saying he is "interested to see what effect The Social Network has on entrepreneurship", noting that he gets "lots of messages from people who claim that they have been very much inspired ... to start their own company." Saverin echoed these sentiments, stating that the film may inspire "countless others to create and take that leap to start a new business."

In 2011, a storyline on The Good Wife featuring a technology executive suing a screenwriter appeared to be inspired by the tension between Mark Zuckerberg and Aaron Sorkin.

Following his success with the film, Sorkin became attached to another project about a technology company, writing the script for the 2015 biopic Steve Jobs, which used a similar format. Another Facebook film may be produced, as Sheryl Sandberg has signed a deal with Sony Pictures Entertainment to develop her 2013 book Lean In: Women, Work and the Will to Lead, into a film.

=== Post-2010s assessment ===
Following the close of the decade, The Social Network was recognized as one of the best films of the 2010s. Metacritic reported that it was listed on over 30 film critics' top-ten lists for the 2010s, including eight first-place rankings and four second-place rankings. Metacritic ranked The Social Network third overall, following Mad Max: Fury Road and Moonlight. Esquire named The Social Network the best of the 2010s, calling it Citizen Kane "for the Internet age" and dubbing it "the movie of our new millennium". With Facebook going "from a utopian, world-shrinking force of good to a potential threat to democracy", Esquire wrote, "Fincher seemed to sense all of this and more long before anyone else. And his brilliant, troubling film bristles with that queasy sense of prophecy and prescience." Polygon, calling The Social Network the best film of the decade, wrote, "The Social Network, by chance or by design, has become one of the most immensely relevant movies of this decade ... But after nearly a decade of watching Facebook 'move fast and break things,' including news websites, social video, politics, etc., the movie's tangible sense of tension can easily be reinterpreted as foreboding for what comes after you make a billion friends." Director Quentin Tarantino called the film the best of the 2010s, singling out the script by Sorkin, whom he described as "the greatest active dialogist".

Rolling Stone ranked The Social Network second after Moonlight (2016) on its end-of-decade list, describing it as "one deliciously re-watchable preview of the apocalypse, as entertaining and cheeky as it is troubling and startlingly prescient". Time Out named it the fourth-best of the decade, "Powered by a relentless, clinical Aaron Sorkin script, directed with sinuous grace by David Fincher and loaded with smirking, smart-ass central performances, The Social Network is arguably the most important and prophetic film of our era, itself a depressing thought." ScreenCrush ranked The Social Network eighth, referring to it as "[Fincher's] spiritual sequel to Fight Club, another story of an embittered, lonely man who discovers unleashing his rage at society has unexpected consequences". Mashable, listing The Social Network among the top 15 films of the 2010s, said of the story, "It was everything young people could be and everything older generations feared in us before a decade of blaming [us for] problems we didn't create and can't solve." IndieWire ranked The Social Network sixteenth among the decade's films, writing, "The Social Network is both a thrilling, queasy exploration of how Facebook came to be and a searing indictment of what it would inevitably become." Inverse listed the film among those defining "class rage" in the 2010s, "As a gently prodding diagnosis of class conflict, The Social Network is a logical place to start."

The February 2020 issue of New York Magazine lists The Social Network as among "The Best Movies That Lost Best Picture at the Oscars."

In 2024, Looper ranked it number 5 on its list of the "50 Best PG-13 Movies of All Time," writing "Fincher and screenwriter Aaron Sorkin's examination of Facebook's ascension in power and how that came at the cost of so many people's well-being and relationships has only gotten more prescient as the years have passed by. Plus, performances as good as the ones delivered here by Jesse Eisenberg and Andrew Garfield never go out of style."

In June 2025, the film ranked number 10 on both The New York Times' list of "The 100 Best Movies of the 21st Century" . In July 2025, it ranked number 13 on Rolling Stone's list of "The 100 Best Movies of the 21st Century."

== Sequel ==
In January 2019, Sorkin revealed that Rudin has suggested the development of a screenplay for a sequel, noting, "A lot of very interesting, dramatic stuff has happened since the movie ends." Sorkin also mentioned that there was indeed enough material to create a sequel. On July 18, 2019, Eisenberg expressed his interests in starring in the proposed sequel, stating that "Sorkin is a genius, and if he chooses to write about something, I'll obviously be interested". In October 2020, a decade after the film's release, Sorkin announced that he would only write the sequel's script if Fincher returned as director. In 2023, Fincher told The Guardian that he and Sorkin have discussed a sequel, but said "that's a can of worms." On April 26, 2024, Sorkin said he had been working on the script for a new Facebook movie tied to the January 6 United States Capitol attack.

On June 25, 2025, it was announced that a sequel, The Social Network Part II, was in active development with Sorkin returning to write and direct. Variety reported in July 2025 that although there had been meetings with possible cast members, "the film is still very much in the development stage and has yet to receive the green light from Sony." The Hollywood Reporter reported that Sorkin was working on packaging a cast and budget for the studio, which saw the project as a priority. Reports of potential casting included Mikey Madison as Frances Haugen and Jeremy Allen White as Jeff Horwitz, although no official deal has been made yet. Jeremy Strong was also being reported to be in talks for a role, speculated to be either a WSJ editor or to replace Eisenberg as Mark Zuckerberg. In September 2025, it was announced that the sequel would be called The Social Reckoning to be released by Sony Pictures in October 2026, with Strong playing Zuckerberg, Madison as Haugen, and White as Horwitz. It was announced later in September that Bill Burr was in talks to star as a fictional character. Early production reportedly took place in Vancouver in October 2025.

== See also ==
- List of 2010 films based on actual events
