= Gaming Wall Street =

- Poster
- Genre: Documentary; True crime
- Directed by: Tobias Deml
- Starring: Harvey Pitt; Keith Gill (archival); Ramona Ortega; Dennis Kelleher; David Wenger; Tobin Mulshine; John Fichthorn; Tommy Cooperman; Susanne Trimbath
- Narrated by: Kieran Culkin
- Composers: Kate Bacich; Ian Rees
- Country of origin: United States
- Original language: English
- No. of seasons: 1
- No. of episodes: 2

Production
- Executive producers: Floris Bauer; Janet H.A. Brown; Van Toeffler; Joanna Zwickel; Justin Li; Max Deml
- Producers: Tessa Byford; Burke Koonce; John Fichthorn
- Cinematography: Olga Vazquez; Tobias Deml
- Editors: Tom Patterson; Rich Hyatt; David Tillman; Rachael Wax Taber; Brian Kallies
- Production companies: Gunpowder and Sky; Prodigium Pictures; Biltmore Films

Original release
- Network: HBO Max
- Release: March 3, 2022

Gaming Wall St is a documentary television miniseries directed by Tobias Deml and narrated by Kieran Culkin. The two-episode series was released on March 3, 2022 on HBO Max. It explores the causes that led to the 2021 GameStop short squeeze, and the dark underbelly of Wall Street that the phenomenon unearthed: payment for order flow, creative accounting, abuses of the short selling mechanism like naked short selling, corporate overvoting and failures to deliver (FTDs).

== Production ==
The series was initiated by Prodigium Pictures, a production company owned by director Tobias Deml, in late 2020. In its earliest form, Deml and producer Tessa Byford conceived of a documentary that would follow the rowdy online community Wall Street Bets. Once the GameStop phenomenon—popularized by that community—became a #1 global headline however, the focus shifted more towards the tug-of-war around meme stocks, and the financial markets phenomena underpinning this highly unusual event. Filming began on February 1, 2021, in Nevada. Due to multiple documentaries being announced on the subject, the team chose to stay completely stealth and evaded any publicity. Prodigium teamed up with Biltmore Films (who had produced Betting on Zero a few years earlier); principals Burke Koonce and John Fichthorn were instrumental in elevating the documentary from a human interest piece with wild online culture wars to an investigative analysis of the darker corners of the financial system that the movement around GameStop exposed.

The companies won the support of Biltmore's prior distributor, Gunpowder and Sky, for the project. The series was then pitched to HBO Max, and the streamer green-lit a two episode structure in the fall of 2021. The show was edited in secrecy on a highly compressed timeline of only 3.5 months with a team of 6 editors working in parallel, and a globally distributed animation team readying both narrative and schematic visualizations. Deml and Byford concluded filming during post-production in early January 2022.

Gaming Wall St was announced with a trailer on February 26 and released on March 3, 2022.

Director Tobias Deml, having worked extensively in the space of social impact entertainment and intending to spread financial literacy has stated that during the course of production, he "saw a great need for access to education about investing. We have the opportunity to right a decades-old wrong created by powerful firms that have been gaming the system to the detriment of society." and "I hope that viewers will feel empowered to see themselves as investors and be part of a much-needed reform."

== Episodes ==
No.	Title	Directed by	Original release date
1	"Risky Bets"	Tobias Deml	March 3, 2022
2	"Lifting the Veil"	Tobias Deml	March 3, 2022

== Reception ==
ShowBiz Cheat Sheet has called the series a "Must-See" while TV Guide criticized that the series "doesn't go deep enough on the culture or the alleged crimes". Decider gave it a "Stream it!" recommendation, explaining "If you loved the mix of harsh language and financial market minutiae that defined The Big Short, then from its narrative to its visuals, you'll dig on Gaming Wall Street's whole entire groove."
