= R/wallstreetbets =

Subreddit for stock and option trading

r/wallstreetbets
- Icon
- Website type: Subreddit
- Founded: January 31, 2012; 14 years ago
- Founder: Jaime Rogozinski
- Key people: Keith Gill
- Website: reddit.com/r/wallstreetbets
- Users: 19.9 million subscribers (as of 2026)

r/wallstreetbets, also known as WallStreetBets or WSB, is a subreddit where participants discuss stock and option trading. It has become notable for its colorful jargon, aggressive trading strategies, stories of extreme profits and losses made in the stock market, and internet memes. It came to wider public attention in early 2021, playing a major role in the GameStop short squeeze, which caused significant losses for several US hedge funds and short sellers.

== Overview ==
The subreddit, describing itself through the tagline "Like 4chan found a Bloomberg terminal", is known for its aggressive trading strategies, which primarily revolve around highly speculative, leveraged options trading. Members of the subreddit are often young retail traders and investors who ignore fundamental investment practices and risk management techniques, so their activities are often considered gambling. The growing popularity of no-commission brokers and mobile online trading has potentially contributed to the growth of such trading trends. Members of the communities often see high-risk day trading as an opportunity to quickly improve their financial conditions and obtain additional income. Some of the members tend to use borrowed capital, like student loans, to bet on certain "meme stocks" that show popularity within the community.

The subreddit is also known for its use of profane, self-deprecating humor, with members often referring to themselves as "retards", "degenerates", and "apes". Users also frequently use slang such as "stonks" for stocks; "tendies" for gains or profits; "gay bears" for those who expect a stock to decline, for stock shorters, or as a general insult; "DD" (from "due diligence") for analysis of potential trades; "bagholder" for one whose position has severely dropped in value; "diamond hands" for holding stocks adamantly; and "paper hands" for selling at the first sign of loss. Members of the community post memes and joke posts about the financial market, with the Meme Man (also known as Stonks guy) becoming one representation of the subreddit.

== History ==
WallStreetBets was founded on January 31, 2012, by Jaime Rogozinski, a 30 year old American citizen at the time. "When I created the sub, I was looking for a community, a place for people to talk about high-risk trades in an unapologetic way for people to make some short term money with disposable income," Rogozinski told TMZ Live. Within four years, r/wallstreetbets had begun to flourish, accruing roughly 100,000 subscribers by the end of 2016. Reddit's administrators removed Rogozinski from the subreddit and banned him from moderating the community in April 2020, a month after he attempted to trademark the subreddit name. In February 2023 he filed a lawsuit against Reddit for breach of contract and trademark infringement, which was dismissed in July 2023. Over time, r/wallstreetbets subscriber base continued to grow. At the end of 2022, WallStreetBets' subscriber count had risen to 13.3 million, with the 10th highest comments-per-day of any subreddit.

Among the most prominent of r/wallstreetbets subscribers: Turing Pharma CEO Martin Shkreli. Considered by BBC to be the most hated man in America, Martin Shkreli was open about his identity to followers of r/wallstreetbets, frequently posting his theses on biotech and healthcare stocks (in one instance betting $20 million on the outcome of a drug trial). Other notable names to visit the subreddit include billionaire investor Mark Cuban, popular YouTube content creator MrBeast, well-known Twitch streamer Pokimane (who was a full-moderator in 2020), and Tesla CEO Elon Musk, although he has not posted on the subreddit.

== GameStop short squeeze ==
Closing price and trade volume of GameStop Corp. (GME) from January 4, 2021, to February 5, 2021

On January 22, 2021, users of r/wallstreetbets initiated a short squeeze on GameStop, pushing its stock prices up significantly. This occurred shortly after a comment from Citron Research predicting the value of the stock would decrease. The stock price increased more than 600 percent by January 26, and its high volatility caused trading to be halted multiple times. A series of posts by Keith Gill under the username u/DeepFuckingValue on the subreddit helped generate interest in the stock.

After the GameStop stock closed up 92.7 percent on Tuesday, January 26, Elon Musk tweeted out a link to the r/wallstreetbets subreddit. This caused a spike in subscribers to r/wallstreetbets. On January 24, 2021, it had 2.06 million subscribers, which increased nearly threefold to 6.2 million on January 29, 2021.

On January 27, r/wallstreetbets users also triggered a short squeeze on AMC, another company with heavily shorted stock, similar to GameStop.

On January 27, the official r/wallstreetbets Discord server was banned for "hateful and discriminatory content". Discord denied that the ban was related to the ongoing GameStop short squeeze. In an official statement posted to the r/wallstreetbets subreddit, moderators claimed that their efforts to automatically delete content that violated rules had been overwhelmed by the sheer influx of users, and criticized Discord for not providing the tools needed to take action to curtail hate speech on the server. Subsequently, the r/wallstreetbets Discord server was brought back online, and staff from Discord have been reported assisting with moderation.

The subreddit was set to private by the moderators at around 7:00 p.m. EST on January 27, before being made public again around an hour later. Within one week of the GameStop short squeeze, the subreddit had gained over 2.4 million new subscribers, while it had taken nine years to gain the first 2 million subscribers. As of February 18, 2023, the subreddit had 13.6 million followers, and is the second largest subreddit in the "Business, Economics, and Finance" category.

A few days following the short squeeze, some subreddit users started to pay for billboards depicting messages supporting r/wallstreetbets across the country, which included messages such as "buying" and "holding" GME shares, other messages consisted of "we like the stock" and joining the subreddit, labelling it as a "movement". Reddit also ran a five-second commercial during Super Bowl LV celebrating the subreddit, stating that "underdogs can accomplish just about anything when we come together around a common area."

The event was adapted into the film Dumb Money, released in 2023. The film itself is based on the September 2021 non-fiction book The Antisocial Network.

== Effect on the Robinhood trading platform ==
As of December 2022, many members of the subreddit used the mobile app Robinhood to trade stocks and options. Some members have been responsible for significant feature removals and bug fixes after identifying and publishing ways to exploit them.

=== Box spread ban ===
Around January 2019, a user known as u/1R0NYMAN sold a box spread creating a $300,000 credit that should have netted him from $40,000–50,000 over the course of two years. He described the trade as a way to make "risk-free money", but he was unaware of the assignment risk. A few days later, some of the options were exercised against him, causing a loss of over $60,000; calculating from the original amount in the user account, $5,000, the negative return of the trade was 1,832.99%. As a result, Robinhood decided soon after that it would no longer allow the trading of box spreads. The user withdrew $10,000 from the account before the positions were closed; it is believed by the news website MarketWatch that the brokerage itself took the majority of the loss.

=== The "infinite leverage" glitch ===
Around November 2019, a user known as u/ControlTheNarrative found a bug in Robinhood's trading platform and exploited it to leverage his original deposit of $2,000 up to roughly $50,000, resulting in a leverage ratio of approximately 25:1. He sold covered calls and, thanks to the bug, the credit that he received appeared as liquid money on his account. He used the money to buy put options on Apple stock, a trade which led to a loss of $46,000, enormous relative to his initial deposit of only $2,000. He recorded the live reaction to his loss and uploaded it on his YouTube channel. Many other users tried to exploit the glitch, which they referred to as the "free money cheat code", before it was fixed, with one in particular claiming to have opened a $1,000,000 position from a $4,000 deposit.

=== Robinhood restricts trading ===
On January 28, 2021, during the GameStop short squeeze, Robinhood, TD Ameritrade, E-Trade, and Webull restricted the trade of heavily shorted stocks such as GameStop, AMC, BlackBerry Limited, Nokia, and Koss Corporation on their platforms. Many of the brokerage firms, including Robinhood, stated that the restrictions were the result of clearing houses raising the collateral required for executing trades on highly volatile stocks. Numerous members of the community have since expressed outrage directed towards those companies, particularly Robinhood. Efforts by r/wallstreetbets members and others across the Reddit platform plummeted Robinhood's star rating in both the iOS and Android app stores to one star through review bombing by January 28, though intervention by Google increased its rating to 2.2 (as of January 30) by deleting one-star reviews. Class-action lawsuits were subsequently filed against Robinhood for the restrictions on trading.

== Spawn of meme stocks ==
The popularity of the GameStop short squeeze on r/wallstreetbets spawned interest in other heavily shorted stocks, such as AMC and Bed Bath & Beyond, which saw similar surges in prices. This was partly driven by the same dynamics of a short squeeze, as well as a sense of camaraderie and rebellion among individual investors who were taking on large institutional investors. In the aftermath of the events, some of the companies involved, including AMC, saw their stock prices decline significantly.

== See also ==
- Gaming Wall Street
