= GameStop short squeeze =

2021 financial markets event

View chart definition.
View chart definition.
Closing price and trade volume of GameStop Corp. (GME) from January 4, 2021, to February 5, 2021

In January 2021, a short squeeze of the stock of the American video game retailer GameStop and other securities took place, causing major financial consequences for certain hedge funds and large losses for short sellers. Approximately 140 percent of GameStop's public float had been sold short, and the rush to buy shares to cover those positions as the price rose caused it to rise even further.

The short squeeze was initially and primarily triggered by Reddit users on r/wallstreetbets, a subreddit on the social news website, although a number of hedge funds also participated. At its height, on January 28, the short squeeze caused the retailer's stock price to reach a pre-market value of over US$500 per share ($125 split-adjusted), nearly 30 times the $17.25 valuation at the beginning of the month. The price of many other heavily shorted securities and cryptocurrencies also increased.

On January 28, some brokerages, particularly app-based brokerage services such as Robinhood, halted the buying of GameStop and other securities, citing the next day their inability to post sufficient collateral at clearing houses to execute their clients' orders. This decision attracted criticism and accusations of market manipulation from prominent politicians and businesspeople from across the political spectrum. Dozens of class action lawsuits have been filed against Robinhood in U.S. courts, and the U.S. House Committee on Financial Services held a congressional hearing on the incident.

The unusually high price and volatility continued after the peak in late January. On February 24, the GameStop stock price doubled within a 90-minute period, and then averaged approximately $200 per share for another month. On March 24, the GameStop stock price fell 34 percent to $120.34 per share after earnings were released and the company announced plans for issuing a new secondary stock offering. On March 25, the stock recovered dramatically, rising by 53 percent.

== Background ==
=== Short selling and short squeezes ===
Short selling is a finance practice in which an investor, known as the short-seller, borrows shares and immediately sells them, in the hope that they will be able to buy them back later ("covering") at a lower price, return the borrowed shares (plus interest) to the lender, and profit off the difference. The practice carries an unlimited risk of losses, because there is no inherent limit to how high a stock's price can rise should the short-seller be proven wrong in their belief that the stock price was going to fall. This is in contrast with taking a long position (simply owning the stock), where the investor's loss is limited to the cost of their initial investment.

Short sellers are exposed to a risk of short squeezing, which occurs when the shorted stock jumps in value because, for instance, there is a sudden piece of favorable news. Short sellers are then forced to buy back the stock they had initially sold, in an effort to keep their losses from mounting. The market demand they create by purchasing the stock to cover their short positions further raises the price of the shorted stock, thus triggering more short sellers to cover their positions by buying the stock. This can result in a cascade of stock purchases and an even bigger jump of the share price.

=== GameStop ===
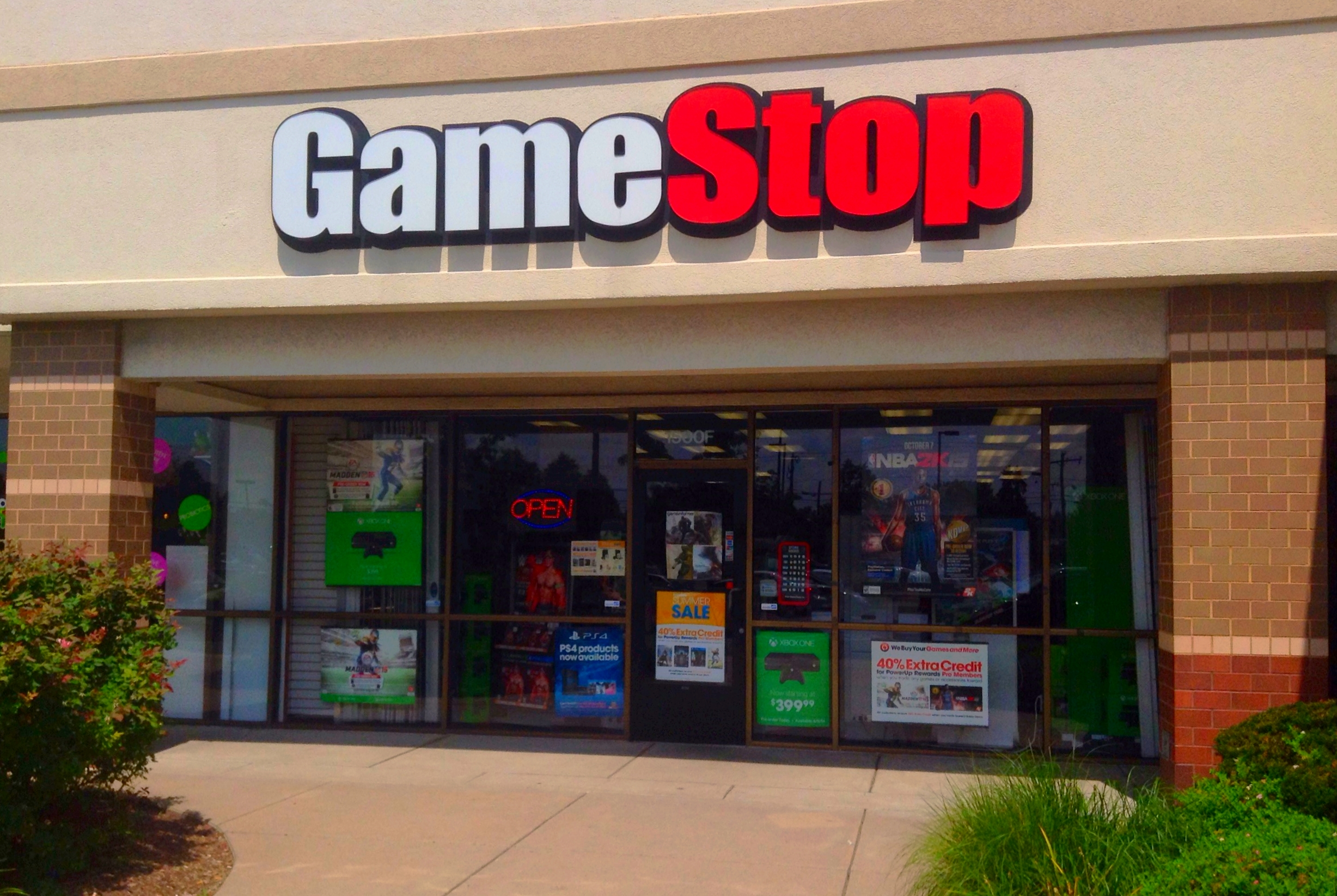
A GameStop store in 2014

GameStop, an American chain of brick-and-mortar video game stores, had struggled in the years leading up to the short squeeze due to competition from digital distribution services, as well as the economic effects of the COVID-19 pandemic, which reduced the number of people who shopped in-person. As a result, GameStop's stock price declined, leading many institutional investors to believe it would continue falling, thus short-selling the stock. On January 22, 2021, approximately 140 percent of GameStop's public float (Note: Public float: the portion of shares of a corporation that are in the hands of public investors.) had been sold short, meaning some shorted shares had been re-lent and shorted again. Analysts at Goldman Sachs later noted that short interest exceeding 100 percent of a company's public float had only occurred 15 times in the prior 10 years.

However, in mid-2019, investor Michael Burry's Scion Asset Management acquired a 3.3-percent stake in GameStop and wrote to the company's board of directors, identifying overlooked value in the company and urging them to buy back shares. In August 2020, Ryan Cohen (the former CEO of online pet food retailer Chewy) revealed a 9-percent investment in GameStop, leading some to believe that the stock was undervalued. In January 2021, Cohen joined GameStop's board, triggering a stock rally.

=== Online discussion ===
The subreddit r/wallstreetbets is an online community on Reddit, a social news website. The community is known for discussion about meme stocks and high-risk stock transactions. Observers congregating around r/wallstreetbets believed the company was being significantly undervalued, and with such a large amount of the stock being short they could trigger a short squeeze, by driving up the price to the point where short sellers had to capitulate and cover their positions at large losses.

Dude everyone thinks I'm crazy, and I think everyone else is crazy. I've dealt in deep value stocks for years but have never endured bearish sentiment this heavy. I expect the narrative to shift in the second half of the year when investors start looking for ways to play the console refresh and they begin to see what I see.
I'll post the update tomorrow as I always do after data readouts. It will be ugly, and everyone will mock me as usual, but I expect GME to bounce back just as it did after the two previous earnings readouts.

... Yea there's deep value, then there's deep fucking value.

— Keith Gill (u/DeepFuckingValue), r/wallstreetbets, January 2020

Even before the short squeeze, there had been interest in GameStop (ticker symbol: GME). Keith Gill, known by the Reddit username "DeepFuckingValue" (often referred to in more formal contexts as "DFV" for short to omit the profanity) and by the YouTube and Twitter alias "Roaring Kitty", purchased around $53,000 in call options on GameStop's stock in 2019 and saw his position rise to a value of $48 million by January 27, 2021. Gill, a 34-year-old marketing professional and Chartered Financial Analyst (CFA) from Massachusetts, stated that he began investing in GameStop during the summer of 2019, after believing the stock to be undervalued. He shared information regarding his investment on r/wallstreetbets, providing regular updates on the investment's performance, including times when the investment had plunged. He stated on January 29, 2021, after the GameStop short squeeze, that he "thought this trade would be successful" but "never expected what [had] happened over the last week", adding that he planned to continue his YouTube channel as Roaring Kitty and potentially buy a house.

Another user, Stonksflyingup, posted a humorous video on October 27, 2020, explaining how a short position by Melvin Capital could be used to execute a short squeeze, using a scene from Chernobyl to illustrate how the hedge fund would blow up similarly to a nuclear reactor.

On January 27, 2021, technology news website Mashable reported that the r/wallstreetbets subreddit had received 73 million page views in 24 hours –– breaking all-time traffic records. On January 29, the community surged by 1.5 million users overnight –– to a total of 6 million users –– making it the fastest-growing subreddit at the time. Reddit moderators temporarily closed the subreddit to the public, and Discord moderators temporarily banned the server for "hateful and discriminatory content."

=== Rise in stock price and volume ===
In January 2021, Reddit users on the r/wallstreetbets subreddit built the foundations for a short squeeze on GameStop, pushing up the stock price significantly. This occurred shortly after a comment from Citron Research predicting the value of the stock would decrease. On January 11, the stock jumped following the announcement that activist investor and Chewy co-founder and former CEO Ryan Cohen was joining GameStop's board, a move that was interpreted as positive for the gaming retailer. The stock price increased 1,500 percent by January 27 over the course of two weeks, and its high volatility caused trading to be halted multiple times. According to Dow Jones market data, more than 175 million shares of GameStop were traded on January 25, the second largest total in a single day, surpassing its 30-day average volume of 29.8 million shares. Some of those investing into the stock were young teenage investors.

Later analysis by a cyber security company of social media posts suggested that thousands of automated bots may have hyped GameStop stock, Dogecoin, and other stocks, on social media. However, it is unclear the extent to which the suspected bot accounts influenced trading.

Avatar of Elon Musk

Elon Musk
(@elonmusk)
tweeted:

Gamestonk!! https://www.reddit.com/r/wallstreetbets/

Jan 26, 2021

After GameStop's stock closed up 92.7 percent on January 26, business magnate Elon Musk tweeted "Gamestonk!!" (Note: Stonk is a humorous alteration of stock popular in Internet slang.)—a reference to the "stonks" meme rising in popularity at the time—along with a link to the r/wallstreetbets subreddit. A brief, sharp rise in the share price to over $200 followed Musk's tweet. As of January 28, 2021, the all-time highest intraday stock price for GameStop was $483.00 (nearly 190 times the low of $2.57 reached 9 months earlier in April 2020). In pre-market trading hours the same day, it briefly hit over $500, up from $17.25 at the start of the month.

The r/wallstreetbets Discord server was banned on January 27 for violating the company's restrictions on hate speech. However, users quickly formed similar servers on the application, and Discord reversed its decision the next day, attempting to help the community moderate its server instead.

On January 27, r/wallstreetbets triggered a short squeeze on AMC Theatres (ticker symbol: AMC), a company in a similar position to GameStop. The value of AMC Networks (ticker symbol: AMCX) also increased significantly, which was believed to have happened because of the stock's name being similar to AMC's. Disruptions and restrictions limiting trade have been reported on multiple brokerages such as Charles Schwab Corporation, its subsidiary TD Ameritrade, and Robinhood. According to Bloomberg, U.S. trading volumes (by share count) on January 27 exceeded the peak set in October 2008 during the 2008 financial crisis, and was the third-highest in dollar terms within the last 13 years on record.

On January 28, more than 1 million GameStop shares, then worth $359 million, were deemed failed-to-deliver. On that day, GameStop's total market cap reached $33.7 billion, which made it temporarily the highest valued company on the Russell 2000 index.

According to the Financial Times, a "gamma squeeze" also took place in addition to the short squeeze: as traders bet on the rise of stocks by purchasing call options, options sellers hedge their positions by purchasing the underlying stocks (here, GameStop and the related securities), thereby driving their prices even higher.

=== Halting of stock purchases ===
On January 28, Robinhood halted purchases of GameStop, AMC Theatres, BlackBerry Limited, Nokia Corporation, and other volatile stocks from its trading platform; customers could no longer open new positions in the stock, although they could still close them. Other brokerages soon followed suit. Many traders were furious, and called for class-action lawsuits in multiple popular Reddit posts. After the markets closed, Robinhood announced it would begin to allow "limited buys" of the affected securities starting the following day, although it was unclear what "limited buys" entailed. Trading platforms such as UK-based Trading212 and Israel-based eToro blocked buys of GameStop and other stock while continuing to allow sales. Webull halted buy orders for stocks affected by the squeeze, but soon thereafter allowed orders to continue. Anthony Denier, the CEO of Webull, stated that increased collateral requirements for their clearing house meant Webull themselves were restricted from opening new positions. Some users alleged that Robinhood was selling shares without consent; Robinhood denied these allegations.

Several brokerage firms, including Robinhood, stated on January 29 that the restrictions were the result of clearing houses raising the required collateral for executing trades. Because there is a lag (at the time, two days) between the moment when investors purchase a security and the moment cash and securities are actually exchanged, brokerage firms have to post collateral at clearing houses to guarantee the proper settlement of their clients' orders. Clearing houses include the Depository Trust & Clearing Corporation (DTCC) for equities and the Options Clearing Corporation (OCC) for options. Clearing houses must have enough collateral on hand to settle a member's outstanding transactions in the event any particular member firm fails—to prevent cascading failures of other members—and can demand additional collateral (i.e., margin calls) from members if market volatility starts to increase. Brokerage firms claimed that the increased collateral could not be provided in time, and, as a result, trading had to be halted. The DTCC, for instance, increased the total industrywide collateral requirements from $26 billion to $33.5 billion, noting that the large trading volumes in specific stocks "generated substantial risk exposures at firms that clear these trades [...] particularly if the clearing member or its clients are predominantly on one side of the market". On January 29, it was reported that Robinhood had raised an additional $1 billion to protect the company from the financial pressure placed by the increased interest in particular stocks and meet the collateral requirements of clearing houses.

As of January 29, Robinhood was still imposing limits on the trading of GameStop, AMC, and Blackberry stocks. On January 30, Robinhood announced it had added purchase restrictions to 50 securities, including companies such as Rolls-Royce Holdings and Starbucks Corporation. However, on January 31, Robinhood announced it had removed several of these restrictions and would only limit purchases of eight securities.

=== Decline in value ===
On February 1 and 2, the stock price for GameStop declined substantially, losing more than 80 percent of its value from its intraday peak price, recorded during the previous week. GameStop shares lost 60 percent of their value on February 2, closing below $100 for the first time in a week. Reports estimated that about $27 billion in value had been erased. Other assets affected by the short squeeze and put under company trading restrictions, such as AMC and Blackberry shares, also declined in value. CNN reported that the drop was partly due to restrictions imposed by Robinhood and other brokers on the number of shares that could be purchased at once by their clients. The short squeezed securities' prices continued to decline during the week.

Despite the decline, some r/wallstreetbets users rallied to convince other users to hold on to the shares, arguing either that they would increase in value or that such an action would send a political message. As the stock prices continued to decline, some of the recent investors held on to their shares, and suffered significant losses.

=== Resurgence from February 24 ===
On February 24, GameStop share prices doubled in heavy volume in the final 90 minutes of trading, with the company's stock halting twice, shortly before closing at $91.70, a 104-percent gain. Gains continued in after-hours trading, nearing an additional 100 percent. Similar gains, although not as high, were reported with cinema operator AMC, clothing retailer Express and communications software group BlackBerry. Reports could not identify a specific cause for the surge. The jump came a day after GameStop announced its chief financial officer Jim Bell would resign to help 'accelerate GameStop's transformation'.

On March 8, the stock surged 41 percent to $194.50, following GameStop's announcement that Ryan Cohen would lead a new committee to help the company's transition to e-commerce. Around 25 percent of the stocks remained shorted at the time. On March 9, the stock surged to its highest point since January, resulting in a market capitalization over $17 billion. Shares closed at $246.90, and increased a further 3 percent in after-hours trading. On the morning of 10 March, the stock rose as high as $348.50, before being paused for volatility, and then dropping 40 percent by 12:30 pm EST to the previous day's close.

On March 24, the GameStop stock price fell 34 percent to $120.34 per share after earnings were released and the company announced plans for issuing a new secondary stock offering worth up to $1 billion. The same day, short interests had dropped to 15 percent, compared to the 141 percent level at its peak in January. On March 25, the stock rose 53 percent from its previous day's decline of 34 percent.

GameStop reported on their Form 10-Q that, as of June 1, 2023, their investors had directly registered (DRSed) 76.6 million shares with their transfer agent via the direct registration system.

== Impact on involved entities ==
=== Losses by short sellers ===
By January 28, 2021, Melvin Capital, an investment fund that heavily shorted GameStop, had lost 30 percent of its value since the start of 2021, and by the end of January had suffered a loss of 53 percent of its investments. Citadel LLC and firm partners then invested $2 billion into Melvin, while Point72 Asset Management's investment added $750 million, for a total investment of $2.75 billion, before Melvin told CNBC that they covered (closed) their position on January 26, although the exact amount was not disclosed. On January 27, a Melvin Capital spokesperson stated that the fund had closed its position after repositioning its portfolio. For the month of February, Melvin posted a 22-percent gain, but it would need much more to break even from their earlier losses; they were reported to have suffered further losses during the GME's continued resurgence in May 2021. Melvin ultimately shut down on May 18, 2022.

According to a report by Bloomberg, Andrew Left, an activist short seller and head of Citron Research, had also shorted the stock and claimed to have closed the position as a total loss. In an interview, he claimed that the company had covered the majority of its short positions in the range of $90 per share at a loss of 100 percent, retaining a small, manageable position. Due to the enormous losses, Left stated that Citron Research would stop providing short-sell analysis, and instead focus on "long side multibagger opportunities for individual investors". Other firms that incurred large losses include D1 Capital Partners, which lost $4 billion (20 percent of its capital).

On January 26, it was reported that short sellers had lost a total of $6 billion due to the squeeze. According to Morgan Stanley, a number of hedge funds covered their short positions and sold shares in their portfolio to reduce leverage and market exposure, in some of the largest such actions within 10 years. On February 1, GameStop short interest fell to 39 percent of free-floating shares, from 114 percent in mid-January, according to IHS Markit. The data was described by Bloomberg News as "potentially an early sign that the short squeeze that propelled GameStop... has progressed." Trading on March 8, specifically, caused $609 million in losses from short sellers.

According to Kate Kelly and Matthew Goldstein, writing in The New York Times, the short squeeze made short selling even more difficult and called into question its financial viability by demonstrating how social media retail investors using free trading apps could effectively target hedge funds. In addition, whereas short sellers had always needed to be alert for potential lawsuits from the companies they targeted, the squeeze prompted worry about attacks on social media and, in some cases, threats to their personal safety.

After GameStop's share price spiked again in May 2021, it was reported that Light Street Capital, run by so-called "tiger cub" Glen Kacher, was down more than 20 percent during 2021. On June 22, 2021, White Square Capital, a London-based hedge fund that was reported to have suffered "double-digit percent" losses betting against GameStop, announced that it would be shutting down.

=== Companies with increased stock value ===
As of January 31, executives at BlackBerry and GameStop had sold more than $22 million in stock since January 1. There is no allegation of insider trading among BlackBerry executives, according to CBS News. Three BlackBerry executives sold nearly $1.7 million of the company's stock, with one of the executives, chief financial officer Steve Rai, selling all of his shares in the company excepting unvested employee stock options.

GameStop Chair Kathy Vrabeck and board member Raul Fernandez sold shares from January 13 to 16, making $1.4 million, and likewise, board member Lizabeth Dunn cashed in $156,700. GameStop CEO George Sherman owns over 2.3 million shares in the company, according to Bloomberg News. These shares were worth $44 million on December 31, but reached $1.1 billion when GameStop's stock reached $469, briefly making him a billionaire, before the value of his stock dropped to $901 million on January 29.

The heightened volatility of the GameStop share price over this time period likely posed operational difficulties (while perhaps also creating some novel opportunities) for the GameStop executive team concerning the servicing of existing debt and raising of capital for future projects. To whatever extent volatility legibly (or allegedly) projects back onto operational reality becomes finally yet another component of the viral feedback loop, as partially grounded in George Soros's theory of reflexivity.

=== Gains by existing shareholders and third parties ===
While the short squeeze was initially reported as being driven by retail investors, it later emerged that a substantial part of the market activity surrounding GameStop and the related securities was conducted by hedge funds, who had made substantial profits from the short squeeze. An analysis by Reuters concluded that some of Wall Street's largest asset managers were able to realize gains both from their share stakes, as well as from lending out stocks to short sellers. Similarly, an analysis by investment bank JP Morgan Chase suggested that institutional investors were heavily involved in the trading activity related to the short squeeze. Brokerages, trading systems and market makers have also gained from higher-than-average volume of transfers.

Hedge fund manager Senvest Management, which had previously bought a five percent stake in GameStop when shares were at $10, made a profit of $700 million, exiting its position after Elon Musk tweeted "Gamestonks!". Asset manager BlackRock had a roughly 13-percent stake in GameStop, which was worth $2.6 billion at the peak. Mudrick Capital Management made a profit of close to $200 million in January 2021 on its holdings of AMC debt, and a profit of $50 million writing call options on AMC and GameStop stock. The mutual fund Morgan Stanley Institutional Inception saw a 30-percent rise in its value based in part due to the 346,943 GameStop shares it had purchased in September 2020. The Church of Jesus Christ of Latter-day Saints, through its investment manager Ensign Peak Advisors, bought 46,000 shares of GameStop in 2020, and saw the value of its investment jump 900 percent.

The trading led to increase in the stock of the Koss Corporation, and by selling stock the executives and directors of the company were able to earn $45 million, which was greater than the company's valuation in 2020.

=== Losses by retail investors ===
Many retail investors and r/wallstreetbets users bought shares of GameStop and other affected securities as they were reaching their peak prices or shortly afterwards. Other investors held onto their long positions while the stock prices were declining rapidly, amid widespread calls on r/wallstreetbets to hang on to the failing shares. In an "ask me anything session" on r/wallstreetbets, entrepreneur Mark Cuban also encouraged GameStop buyers to hold on to their stock if they were able to. As the stock prices continued to decline, many retail investors suffered significant losses, with some r/wallstreetbets users losing a majority of their savings.

== Other affected assets ==
=== Stocks ===
Apart from GameStop, many other heavily shorted securities (as well as securities with low short interest) saw increases in their prices:

Selected stocks experiencing sharp price increases (USD)
Security (symbol)	Price high^{[a]}	Jan 22, 2021	% chg.	Ref.
AMC Entertainment Holdings, Inc. (AMC)	20.36	3.51	480.1%	
AMC Networks Inc. (AMCX)	59.83	49.38	21.2%	
American Airlines Group Inc. (AAL)	21.77	15.82	37.6%	
BB Liquidating Inc. (OTCID Basic: BLIAQ)	0.30	0.01	3000%	
Bed Bath & Beyond Inc. (BBBY)	53.90	30.21	78.4%	
BlackBerry Limited (BB)	28.77	14.04	104.9%	
Build-A-Bear Workshop, Inc. (BBW)	8.40	4.52	85.8%	
Eastman Kodak Company (KODK)	15.15	9.46	60.1%	
Express, Inc. (EXPR)	13.97	1.79	680.4%	
Fossil Group, Inc. (FOSL)	28.60	9.87	189.8%	
Genius Brands International (GNUS)	3.36	1.57	114.0%	
iRobot Corporation (IRBT)	197.40	98.94	99.5%	
Koss Corporation (KOSS)	127.45	3.34	3,715.9%	
Ligand Pharmaceuticals Incorporated (LGND)	191.59	142.62	34.3%	
The Macerich Company (MAC)	25.99	14.58	78.3%	
Naked Brand Group (NAKD)	3.40	0.44	672.7%	
National Beverage Corp. (FIZZ)	196.43	98.44	99.5%	
Nokia Oyj (NOK)	9.79	4.20	133.1%	
Palantir Technologies Inc. (PLTR)	45.00	32.58	38.1%	
Siebert Financial (SIEB)	18.50	3.70	400.0%	
Tootsie Roll Industries, Inc. (TR)	58.98	30.14	95.7%	
Virgin Galactic Holdings, Inc. (SPCE)	59.43	34.28	73.4%	

^{a} Prices may be higher during extended-hours trading.

The shares of GME Resources, an Australian mining company with Australian Securities Exchange (ASX) symbol GME, increased more than 50 percent during intraday trading, closing with a 13.3-percent increase on January 28. This was speculated to have been due to a joke or mistake, as the ASX symbol was the same as GameStop's NYSE ticker symbol (GME).

Amateur traders in Malaysia were inspired by the GameStop short squeeze to target shares for Malaysian latex glove makers on Bursa Malaysia as a countermove against the devaluation of the sector by institutional investors following the lifting of a ban on short selling in the country earlier in January 2021. Top Glove, Hartalega and Supermax respectively recorded increases in shares as high as 15 percent, 10 percent and 9.2 percent during intraday trading on January 29, before closing with respective increases of 8.5 percent, 5.4 percent and 3.7 percent. The rally call was reportedly organized from r/bursabets, a Malaysian offshoot of r/wallstreetbets named after the Malaysian stock exchange. On March 2, Rocket Mortgage saw a more than 70 percent spike in its stock price due to a surge in trading following discussion of the company on r/wallstreetbets, but the Rocket Mortgage stock price reverted to its pre-surge level the next day.

=== Cryptocurrencies ===
After brokerages halted the buying of GameStop and other securities, the price of several cryptocurrencies also began to increase substantially, with Dogecoin's value increasing over 800 percent. Users of the subreddits r/CryptoCurrency and r/SatoshiStreetBets attempted to pump up Dogecoin to make it "the next GME/Bitcoin". In addition, the price of Bitcoin, the world's largest cryptocurrency, increased 20 percent in value to more than $37,000 after Elon Musk endorsed it in his Twitter bio, partially related to the surge in the GameStop share price by Reddit users. Robinhood then began limiting the trading on Dogecoin.

=== Metal futures ===
Following the stock market surge, futures for silver began to rapidly increase as well, although later news reports clarified that it was unclear who was behind the rise. On January 28 and 29, the price of silver rose 10 percent. The surge also had an effect on the prices of gold and copper on the London Metal Exchange. On February 1, the price of silver hit an eight-year high as GameStop shares continued their volatile tendency, with trading being halted at least once as the price fell by double-digit percentages. Users on r/wallstreetbets deny involvement in the increasing price of silver, instead blaming the increase on institutions and hedge funds with positions in silver, such as Citadel, seeking to offset losses on GameStop.

== Aftermath ==
White House Press Secretary Jen Psaki being asked about the short squeeze on January 27

=== Investigations ===
On January 27, 2021, White House press secretary Jen Psaki said that Treasury Secretary Janet Yellen and others in the Biden administration were monitoring the situation. Yellen convened a meeting of financial regulators, including the heads of the U.S. Securities and Exchange Commission, Federal Reserve, Federal Reserve Bank of New York and the Commodity Futures Trading Commission, to discuss the volatility surrounding the short squeeze. Because Yellen had received speaking fees from Citadel before becoming treasury secretary, she sought and received permission from Treasury Department ethics lawyers before convening the meeting. The regulators were not seen as likely to view the volatility as creating any systemic risks.

Speaker of the House Nancy Pelosi said that Congress would also be reviewing it. Senator Sherrod Brown announced that the Senate Banking Committee would hold a hearing on the state of the stock market and the alleged market manipulation surrounding the GameStop short squeeze. Representative Byron Donalds called for Congress to launch "an immediate investigation into Citadel, L.L.C. and Robinhood".

On January 29, 2021, the U.S. Securities and Exchange Commission announced it was reviewing the incident with the aims "to protect retail investors" from "abusive or manipulative trading activity" and "to identify and pursue potential wrongdoing".

Various state Attorney Generals stated their intents with the case, like Attorney General of New York Letitia James, who confirmed in a press release that her office would look into the matter, saying "We are aware of concerns raised regarding activity on the Robinhood app, including trading related to the GameStop stock". Additionally, Texas Attorney General Ken Paxton said he would also investigate the decision of brokerages to limit the buying of securities related to GameStop and other stocks, saying that it "stinks of corruption". His investigation has extended to 13 entities, including Discord, Robinhood, the trading platforms Interactive Brokers and TD Ameritrade, and Citadel Financial.

==== Congressional hearing ====
On January 28, 2021, the House Financial Services Committee announced that it would convene a hearing to discuss online trading platforms. On February 18, 2021, the committee, chaired by Representative Maxine Waters, held a remote hearing titled Game Stopped? Who Wins and Loses When Short Sellers, Social Media, and Retail Investors Collide. Witnesses at the hearing included Reddit user and investor Keith Gill, Citadel CEO Ken Griffin, Reddit CEO Steve Huffman, Melvin Capital CEO Gabe Plotkin, Cato Institute financial regulation expert Jennifer J. Schulp, and Robinhood CEO Vlad Tenev. Representatives focused their attention on Robinhood's role in the event, asking Tenev why the brokerage had limited the trading of some securities and if it had clearly communicated its business model to its customers. They also questioned whether Robinhood was encouraging its customers to take excessive risks in order to generate a profit and whether it had the appropriate infrastructure and funding to handle influxes of new clients. Several committee members expressed skepticism at the practice of payment for order flow and pressed Griffin and Tenev on the issue. Representative Brad Sherman accused Griffin of trying to evade his questions. At various points during his initial testimony and questioning, Gill made references to memes. Committee members also discussed increasing short-selling regulation.

On March 17, 2021, the Financial Services Committee held a second hearing, which focused on the regulation of payment for order flow and gamification of investing.

=== Lawsuits ===
A Robinhood customer filed a class-action lawsuit against the company in federal court on January 28, 2021, for halting trading on GameStop. The lawsuit claimed that Robinhood "purposefully, willfully, and knowingly removing the stock 'GME' from its trading platform in the midst of an unprecedented stock rise thereby deprived retail investors of the ability to invest in the open-market"; the lawsuit also accused Robinhood of "manipulating the open-market". Several other investors began using the app DoNotPay to automatically join the lawsuit.

A second class-action claimed that Robinhood's decision to halt trades of BlackBerry, Nokia and AMC was made "to protect institutional investment at the detriment of retail customers". Similarly, a man in Colorado filed a federal lawsuit against Robinhood as well as Citadel, Charles Schwab, Interactive Brokers, Open to the Public Investing, TD Ameritrade, and Webull, alleging he "was forced into a situation by which he was essentially forced to sale his equities at a drastically reduced position given the new market condition set by these supposedly neutral brokerage houses, taking significant losses and being incapable of trading in these publicly held equities that he had performed significant due diligence and research on, and relied upon over the course of his job as a day trader." As of February 2, 2021, Robinhood was facing 34 separate class-action lawsuits.

The Judicial Panel on Multidistrict Litigation consolidated these and other lawsuits in the Southern District of Florida under the caption IN RE: January 2021 Short Squeeze Trading Litigation, assigned to judge Cecilia Altonaga. In January 2022 Judge Altonaga ruled that investors could not pursue negligence and breach of fiduciary duty claims, citing Robinhood's customer agreement which allowed for restrictions on trading. She had previously dismissed a lawsuit alleging that there was collusion between brokerages and Citadel Securities. As of September 2024 the remainder of the consolidated case is ongoing.

A lawsuit was filed in federal court in Massachusetts by securities class action firm Hagens Berman Sobol Shapiro on behalf of an investor against Keith Gill. The suit alleges Gill misrepresented himself as an amateur investor to inflate the stock price. The lawsuit was voluntarily dismissed two months later.

=== Regulation ===
On February 8, 2021, the U.S. Securities and Exchange Commission released a sample letter providing guidance to companies seeking to raise capital during periods of "extreme price volatility". It requires that companies outline the related risks in their financial disclosures and encourages companies to contact the SEC prior to launching such offerings.

In reaction to the short squeeze, some Democratic politicians have expressed support for a financial transactions tax, arguing that it would raise revenue and curb speculative betting. In June 2022, a 140-page report released by the United States House Committee on Financial Services called for the Securities and Exchange Commission and the Financial Industry Regulatory Authority to craft new rules to address market risks highlighted by the events of January 2021, including a liquidity rule and framework governing liquidity planning for clearing brokers.

=== Scientific research ===
In January 2024, researchers from universities in Italy and Denmark concluded that there was a causal link between the Reddit/Twitter activity and the movements in the stock price.

=== 2024 rally ===
On Sunday May 12, 2024, Keith Gill (a.k.a. DeepFuckingValue, Roaring Kitty) posted to X an image of a person leaning forward in a chair. The following day, the GameStop stock price rose 74%. The stock continued to rise in the following days, from less than $14 to more than $48. GameStop issued new stock at more than $20 during this time, raising over $900,000,000. Other stocks such as AMC, BlackBerry, and Virgin Galactic also experienced large increases during this time period.

== Reactions ==
=== Political figures ===
Avatar of Alexandria Ocasio-Cortez

Alexandria Ocasio-Cortez
(@AOC)
tweeted:

This is unacceptable. We now need to know more about @RobinhoodApp's decision to block retail investors from purchasing stock while hedge funds are freely able to trade the stock as they see fit. As a member of the Financial Services Cmte, I'd support a hearing if necessary.

January 28, 2021

A variety of politicians and commentators across the political spectrum made statements in support of those driving up the price of GameStop and other stocks, as well as against Robinhood and other companies' decision to limit these trades, including Representative Alexandria Ocasio-Cortez, Senator Ted Cruz, Representatives Ro Khanna, Ted Lieu, and Rashida Tlaib, Fox Business host Charles Payne, and conservative political commentators Rush Limbaugh, Ben Shapiro, and Donald Trump Jr.

January 29 letter from Senator Elizabeth Warren to U.S. Securities and Exchange Commission Acting Chair Allison Lee regarding the GameStop short squeeze

Senator Elizabeth Warren criticized both the short sellers and the buyers, and argued that more regulation was needed. She stated that the large investors and hedge funds who were criticizing the rally "have treated the stock market like their own personal casino while everyone else pays the price". She also called for stronger regulatory action from the U.S. Securities and Exchange Commission "to ensure that markets reflect real value, rather than the highly leveraged bets of wealthy traders or those who seek to inflict financial damage on those traders."

In an interview with CNBC, Massachusetts Secretary of the Commonwealth William F. Galvin criticized the investors' behavior as based on reckless speculation and called for a 30-day suspension of trading GME stock, stating "I think we've all recognized the current pandemic has created a unique situation where many have gotten into day-trading and really have no idea exactly what they're doing ... I think small-time investors like that, unsophisticated investors, are going to be hurt by this." In another CNBC interview joined by Canadian businessman and Shark Tank investor Kevin O'Leary, O'Leary disputed Galvin's assertions, saying that real-world education was positive; that the risk of being targeted by "social media vigilantes" would dissuade hedge funds from aggressively selling short stocks; and zero-commission brokerage apps such as Robinhood had sparked a growing interest in retail investing.

On January 28, New York State Comptroller Thomas DiNapoli told reporters that the state pension fund, which had 647,500 shares in March 2020, had sold off hundreds of thousands of shares since then, benefiting from the squeeze.

=== Public figures ===
In a CNBC interview, Reddit co-founder Alexis Ohanian compared the rally to Occupy Wall Street, saying that "it's a chance for Joe and Jane America—the retail buyers of stock—to flex back and push back on these hedge funds." Numerous journalists have also drawn comparison to the Occupy movement. Similar sentiments sympathetic for the retail investors were expressed by billionaire investors Mark Cuban and Chamath Palihapitiya. Palihapitiya, who passed on early investment opportunities in Robinhood, opined that the founding co-CEOs, Baiju Bhatt and Vladimir Tenev, lacked integrity and urged his followers to delete the app. OpenAI CEO Sam Altman suggested the company change its name. SpaceX and Tesla CEO Elon Musk also criticized the general practice of stock shorting, calling it a "scam legal only for vestigial reasons". A number of major hedge funds had previously shorted Tesla, incurring losses of more than $40 billion as the stock rose considerably.

Several celebrities and influencers also criticized Robinhood. Actor and rapper Ja Rule, who had used Robinhood since 2014, said what the company did was "a fucking CRIME" and called the situation "an uprising". Comedian and television host Jon Stewart, after joining Twitter, expressed support for the Reddit traders in his first tweet, stating "they're joining a party Wall Street insiders have been enjoying for years". Late night host Jimmy Kimmel criticized Stewart for his tweet, sarcastically asking him "RealDonaldTrump? Is that you?"; the tweet was later deleted, Kimmel later called the Redditors "Russian disruptors" on his show. YouTuber Philip DeFranco announced he would be dropping his partnership with Robinhood, saying "Robinhood is never getting a fucking spot on my show again regardless of the offer." Barstool Sports founder Dave Portnoy also criticized Robinhood for its lack of "free trading". More generally, it was recognized that Wall Street was now subject to the same populist vigor (afforded by Internet connectivity) as the entertainment industry, politics, and so on.

However, investor Michael Burry, who had acquired a 3.3-percent stake in GameStop in 2019, criticized the short squeeze, stating that "there should be legal and regulatory repercussions", and adding "this is unnatural, insane, and dangerous". In a CNBC interview, billionaire investor and hedge fund manager Leon Cooperman angrily criticized the Reddit users' market behavior, calling it a result of the federal response to the pandemic and stating that it would "end in tears" for the retail investors.

In March 2021, it was reported that the former basketball player Michael Jordan, who was among the most wealthy sports figures, had lost a major portion of his net worth on GameStop shares. His net worth, as reported by Forbes, had declined by $500 million from its peak of $2.1 billion in 2019. Other co-owners of the Charlotte Hornets with Jordan also experienced heavy losses due to short positions on GameStop, being forced into tens of billions of dollars of debt as a result.

=== Retaliation and protests ===
Disgruntled users review-bombed the Robinhood app on the Google Play Store after it halted the trading of GameStop securities, pushing its ratings down to one star. Google deleted at least 100,000 such reviews, calling them "coordinated or inorganic". However, after another round of negative reviews on the app dropping it to a 1.1-star rating, Google confirmed that the new reviews do not violate Google policies and will not be removed. Protesters also showed up outside Robinhood headquarters in Menlo Park, California, at the Securities and Exchange Commission headquarters in Washington, D.C., and the New York Stock Exchange. Menlo Park police reported ten separate incidents related to protests at Robinhood headquarters from January 28 to February 9, including a man throwing animal feces at the building's front door.

The Wall Street Journal reported that short seller and Citron Research editor Andrew Left was being targeted online, including an incident where Left's social media accounts were hacked to text his children "threatening, profane and personal language". Several financial executives hired additional security due to online threats. Gabe Plotkin of Melvin Capital hired security after facing anti-semitic slurs and threats. Steve Cohen deleted his Twitter account after threats to his family.

=== Alleged conflict of interest between Robinhood and Citadel ===
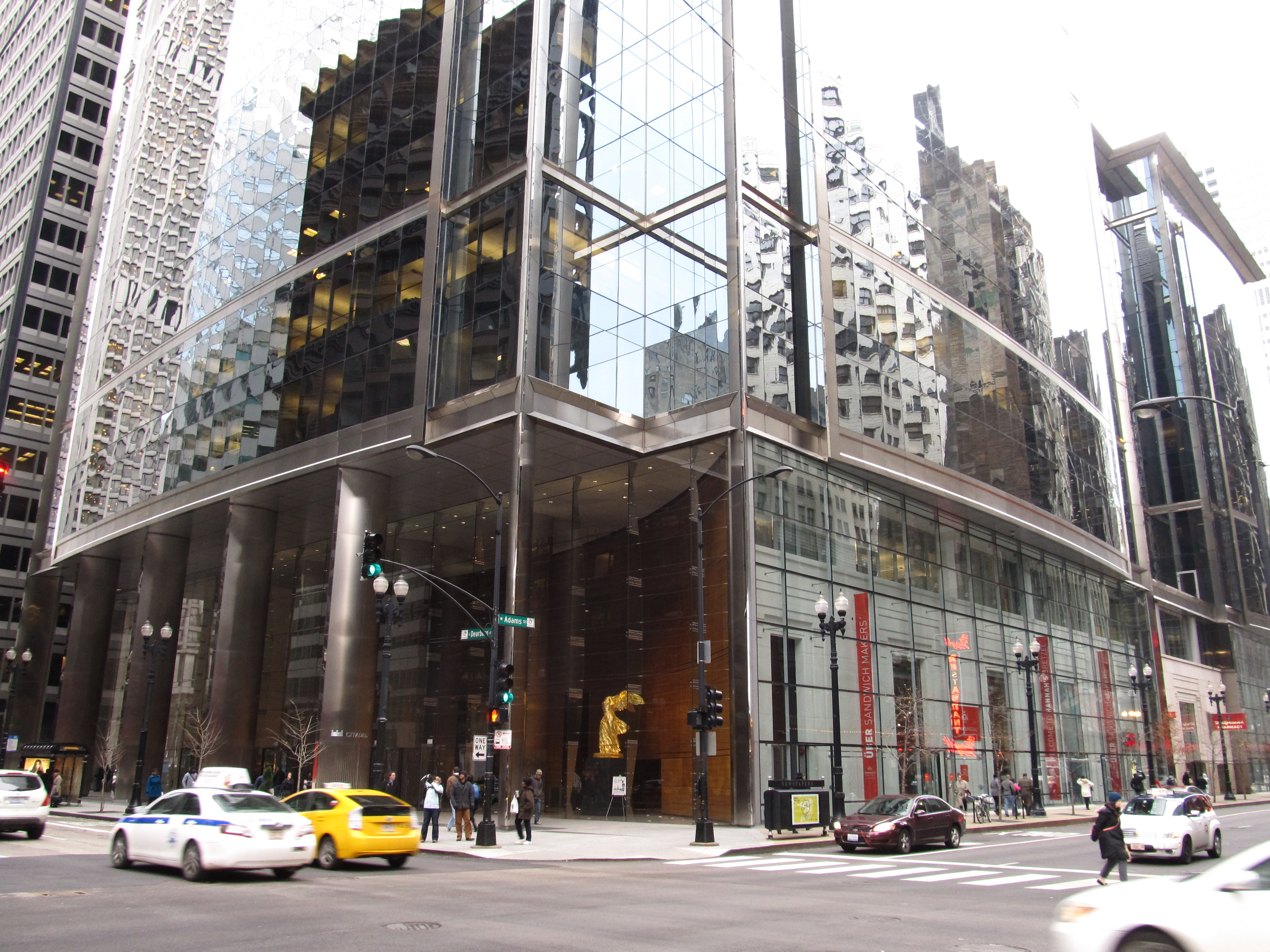
Citadel's Chicago headquarters. Users on Reddit alleged a conflict of interest between the company and Robinhood.

Following the decision by brokerage firm Robinhood to halt the buying of stocks affected by the short squeeze, users on Reddit and other social media called in question its relationship with Citadel Securities. Bloomberg News had previously reported that 40 percent of Robinhood's revenue was derived from selling customer orders to market-making firms including Citadel Securities and Two Sigma Securities, in a practice known as payment for order flow. The Washington Post reported that Robinhood routed more than half of its customer orders to Citadel, which was its largest market making partner by volume. Citadel Securities is the sister company to Citadel LLC, which along with Point72 Asset Management invested $2.75 billion into Melvin Capital. As Robinhood restricted trading of GameStop shares, users alleged that Citadel Securities directed Robinhood to do so. Citadel Securities stated that they did not instruct any brokerage to suspend or otherwise limit trading, and Robinhood denied that it had been pressured by Citadel. In November, a U.S. District Court dismissed a class action lawsuit ruling that investors failed to show collusion.

During the February 18 hearing held by the House Financial Services Committee, Citadel CEO Kenneth Griffin and Robinhood CEO Vlad Tenev faced questioning regarding their relationship and denied that the limits imposed on the trading of GameStop shares had been requested by Citadel.

==== Internal communications revealed ====
On September 27, 2021, Citadel released a statement through Twitter rejecting "Internet conspiracies and Twitter mobs" that alleged the firm pushed Robinhood to limit trading in GameStop. The statement was made as the hashtag #KenGriffinLied was trending on said platform, in which users accused Citadel's CEO Ken Griffin of having lied under oath to Congress. Internal Robinhood messages stemming from a class-action lawsuit, showed Robinhood executives "scrambled to talk to Citadel CEO Ken Griffin", on January 27, 2021, the day trading of GameStop and related stocks was temporally halted, according to VICE.

The lawsuit alleges that on January 27, "employees of Citadel Securities and Robinhood had numerous communications with each other that indicate that Citadel applied pressure on Robinhood." Robinhood President and COO Jim Swartwout said in an internal chat, "you wouldn't believe the convo we had with Citadel, total mess." The lawsuit alleges that a call was set up between Robinhood CEO Vlad Tenev, and a redacted person at Citadel Securities. It notes that Swartwout then stated, "I have to say I am beyond disappointed in how this went down. It's difficult to have a partnership when these kind of things go down this way."

During the Congressional hearing, lawmakers asked Ken Griffin if anyone in Citadel pressured Robinhood to restrict trading, to which he answered, "absolutely not."

== Media adaptations ==
In February 2021, Deadline Hollywood reported on Netflix's plans to develop a feature film based on the events, with Mark Boal in negotiations to write and Noah Centineo set to star in the film. Separately, Metro-Goldwyn-Mayer (MGM) acquired the rights to make its own movie based on Ben Mezrich's book proposal The Antisocial Network, aimed at chronicling the recent events on Wall Street. This would become Dumb Money, released on September 22, 2023.

A limited-run series based on the events titled To the Moon was also announced. Jaime Rogozinski, who founded r/wallstreetbets in 2012, sold off his life experience to RatPac Entertainment, and a documentary based on the event, created by the studios XTR and The Optimist and partially funded by a Kickstarter campaign, is also in the works.

The documentary GameStop: Rise of the Players interviewed several of the r/wallstreetbets users and was released on January 28, 2022.

HBO developed a mini-series, Gaming Wall Street, which was released on March 3, 2022.

In September 2022, Eat the Rich: The GameStop Saga, an investigative-docuseries, premiered on Netflix.

== Speculation on a second short squeeze ("MOASS") ==
As the stock price recovered after the short squeeze, several retail investors on Reddit (many of which still held GameStop stock) began speculating if a second, even bigger, short squeeze could occur through similar methodology. This hypothetical event was eventually dubbed "the mother of all short squeezes" ("MOASS"), and a community sprung up around the theory on various subreddits.

== See also ==
- Cryptocurrency bubble – Speculative bubble involving cryptocurrency prices
- Everything bubble – 2020–2021 correlated bubble in assets
- Philip Falcone – businessman who performed a short squeeze in 2012
- Greater fool theory – Theory that the price of an object is determined by consumer demand
- Irrational exuberance – Unfounded market optimism that lacks fundamental valuation
- Pump and dump – Form of securities fraud
- South Sea Company – 18th-century British company involved in a major financial scandal
- Tulip mania – 17th-century economic bubble in the Netherlands
