= Trade Republic =

German online broker and bank

Trade Republic Bank GmbH
- Type: Private
- Industry: Fintech
- Founded: Munich, 2015
- Founders: Marco Cancellieri; Thomas Pischke; Christian Hecker
- Headquarters: Berlin, Germany
- Area served: Austria, Belgium, Estonia, Finland, France, Germany, Greece, Ireland, Spain, Italy, Latvia, Lithuania, Luxembourg, Netherlands, Poland, Portugal, Slovakia, Slovenia.
- Key people: Christian Hecker (CEO)
- Brands: Trade Republic
- Services: Stockbroker; Electronic trading platform
- AUM: €100 billion (2025)
- Number of employees: 1100 (2025)
- Website: https://traderepublic.com/

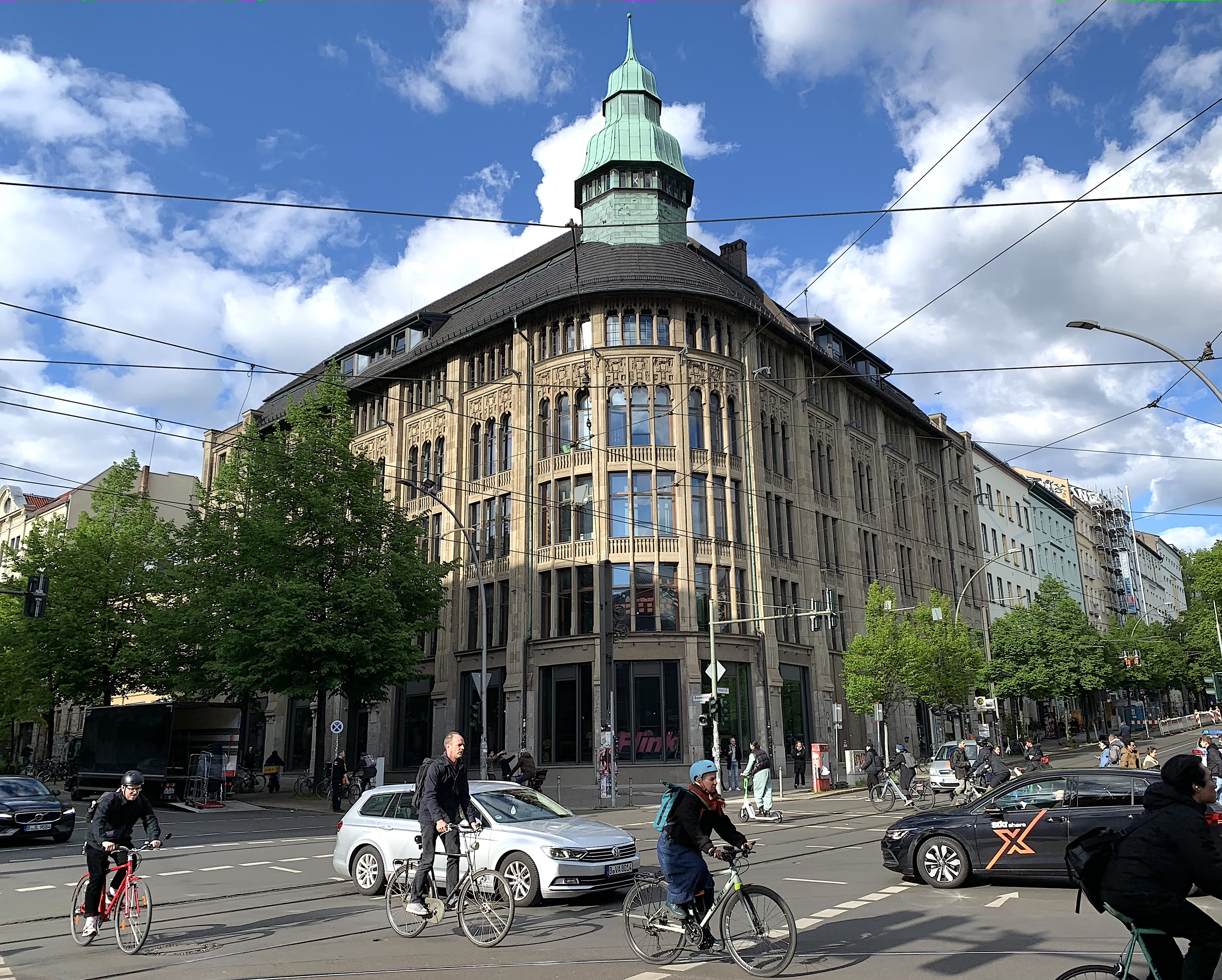
Corporate headquarter in Berlin (2024)

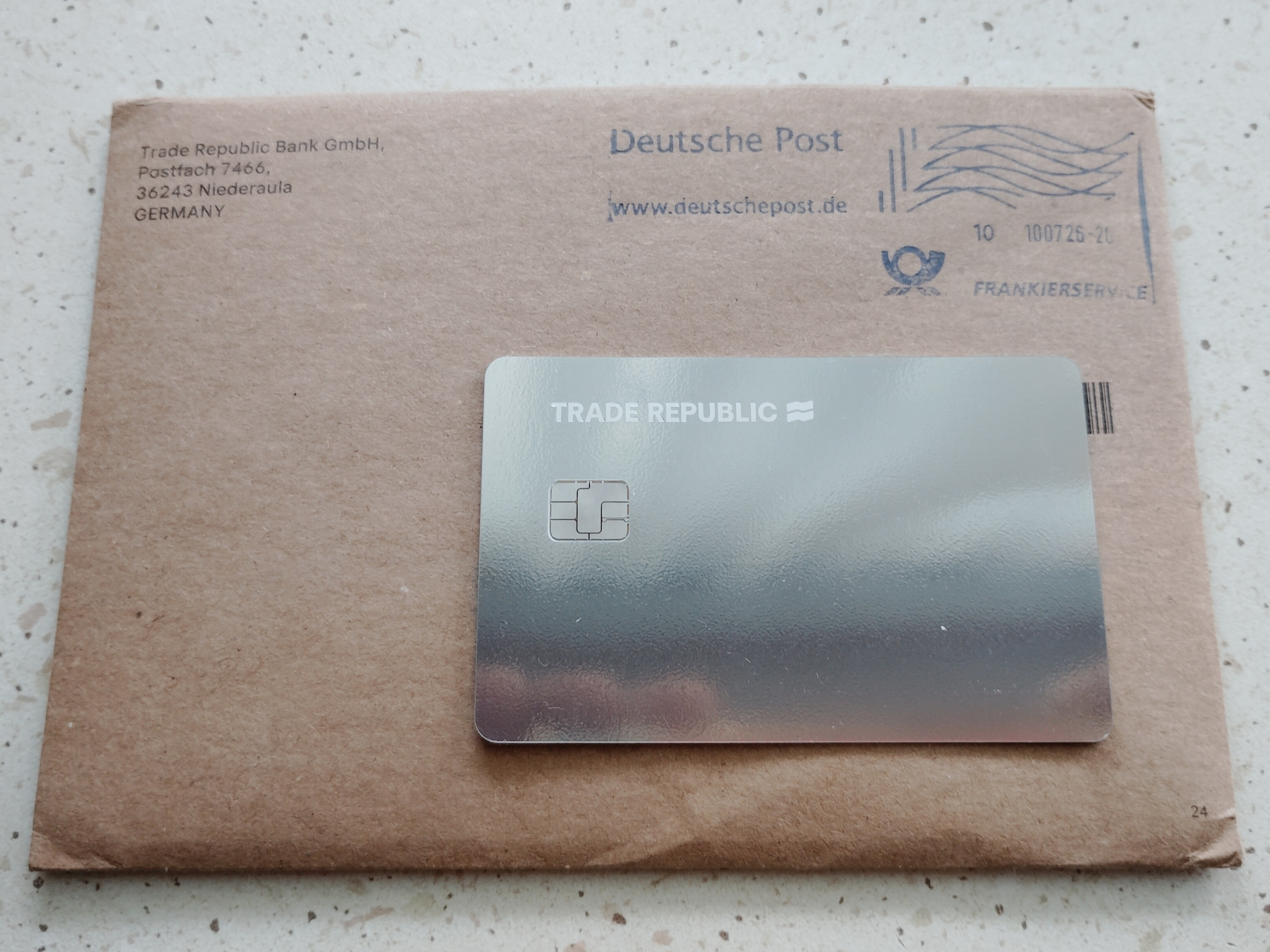
Trade Republic card (distribution in Poland)

Trade Republic Bank GmbH is a German online broker and bank headquartered in Berlin. Founded in 2015, it offers brokerage services through a mobile app and initially relied in part on payment for order flow (PFOF), a practice later phased out in the European Union. After receiving a full banking licence from the European Central Bank in 2023, the company expanded into savings and current-account products. As of April 2025, it had 8 million users in 17 countries and €100 billion in assets.

== History ==
Trade Republic was founded in Munich in 2015 under the name Neon Trading in the startup incubator of Comdirect Bank. The company's founders are philosopher Christian Hecker, physicist Thomas Pischke and computer scientist Marco Cancellieri. In 2017, Düsseldorf-based Sino AG invested in the startup and acquired a majority stake. In 2019 and 2020, venture capital firms including Creandum, Project A Ventures, Accel Partners and Founders Fund invested more than €60 million in the company, reducing Sino's shareholding.

Securities trading via app was first offered in Germany to a closed user group in February 2019 and without user restrictions from May 2019. It had 150,000 users by April 2020, and more than one third of its customers had not previously bought shares or invested in ETFs. Trade Republic launched in France in 2021 and later entered the Spanish market in October 2021. During the GameStop short squeeze in January 2021, Trade Republic temporarily restricted purchases in several meme stocks.

In May 2021, Trade Republic raised $900 million at a valuation of $5 billion. At that point, it had more than one million customers in Germany, France and Austria, and planned launches in Spain and Italy. In June 2022, the company raised a further €250 million in a Series C extension led by Ontario Teachers' Pension Plan Board. It also cut staff in 2022 as market conditions worsened in European fintech.

Trade Republic introduced fractional share trading in 2022, began paying interest on uninvested cash in January 2023, and received a full banking licence from the European Central Bank in December 2023. In 2024, it launched a debit card. In December 2025, a €1.2 billion secondary share sale valued the company at €12.5 billion. Existing investors including Founders Fund, Sequoia Capital, Accel, TCV and Thrive participated in the transaction, while Fidelity, Wellington and GIC were among the new investors.

In January 2026, a Trade Republic subsidiary obtained a BaFin licence to operate a multilateral trading facility, potentially allowing the company to handle equity trading itself after the European Union's phase-out of payment for order flow.

== Products and markets ==
Trade Republic's offering expanded from mobile securities trading into a broader retail investing and savings platform. By 2023, it offered trading in shares, derivatives and cryptocurrencies, and had added ETF savings plans, fractional shares and bond trading.

After receiving a full banking licence in 2023, the company expanded beyond brokerage. By mid-2025, its product range included a debit card and current-account features such as individual IBANs, transfers, standing orders, direct debits and cash withdrawals.

The company expanded beyond Germany into other European markets. In October 2022, it launched in 11 additional markets, taking its coverage to 17 countries, including Germany, France, Italy, Spain, the Netherlands and Austria. As of April 2025, it had 8 million users in 17 countries and €100 billion in assets. In September 2025, Trade Republic launched in Poland, its first market outside the eurozone.

== Operations and business model ==
Trade Republic's early brokerage model combined low explicit trading costs with payment for order flow (PFOF), under which brokers receive compensation for routing client orders to particular execution venues. Single securities orders carried a €1 third-party fee in 2025, while savings-plan executions remained free. Equity trades were still executed through Lang & Schwarz Exchange in January 2026, for which Trade Republic received a rebate. The European Union adopted a general ban on PFOF, with Germany's temporary exemption due to expire on 30 June 2026. In January 2026, a Trade Republic subsidiary obtained a BaFin licence to operate a multilateral trading facility, giving the company an option to internalise more of its trading infrastructure after the phase-out of PFOF.

Before obtaining a full banking licence, Trade Republic held customer funds through partner banks including Solaris, Deutsche Bank AG, J.P. Morgan SE, and Citibank Europe plc. The banking licence granted by the European Central Bank in 2023 allowed it to hold customer deposits directly, making it less reliant on revenue from PFOF. At the time it received the licence, Trade Republic said PFOF accounted for about one third of its revenue; by January 2026, it said the share had fallen to less than 30%. By 2025, customer cash was no longer necessarily held entirely at partner banks, and higher balances could be invested in money market funds after the rollout of the company's own IBAN. Funds held in money market funds were not covered by statutory deposit insurance, unlike cash deposits kept at partner banks.

Trade Republic reported an annual profit of €34.8 million for 2023/24 on revenue of about €340 million, including €316 million in commission income. General administrative expenses rose to €225 million, including personnel expenses of €67 million.

== Legal and operational issues ==
Trade Republic has faced scrutiny over trading restrictions, platform reliability and customer service. During the GameStop short squeeze in January 2021, the platform was disrupted by heavy trading and halted purchases in several meme stocks including GameStop, BlackBerry, Nokia and Bed Bath & Beyond. More than 4,000 complaints were later filed with BaFin over those restrictions. In April 2025, users again reported problems loading their portfolios during extreme market volatility as German stocks fell sharply at the open.

The company has also faced consumer-protection criticism in Germany. In 2022, it promoted a "free share" for opening a securities account, but in some cases allocated only fractional shares. Verbraucherzentrale Hamburg consumer advice centre (Verbraucherzentrale Hamburg) said the company subsequently gave a cease-and-desist undertaking. In February 2025, Verbraucherzentrale Baden-Württemberg said it had sued Trade Republic over allegedly misleading advertising concerning the interest rate on customer cash and the scope of deposit protection.

Operational issues drew criticism in 2024 and 2025. Delays in dividend payments were linked to a system migration. By 31 October 2025, the Verbraucherzentrale Bundesverband had recorded 350 complaints about Trade Republic, up 75% year-on-year. Customer service was criticised for being available mainly through an in-app chat, with some responses generated by AI.

Trade Republic also faced criticism in 2025 over depot transfers. In November 2025, competitors raised allegations over delays in portfolio transfers, and one called for BaFin to intervene. In September 2025, Trade Republic wrongly debited excessive tax from some customers more than a year after Nvidia's stock split, including one case involving €9,686.

== See also ==
- List of banks in Germany
- List of electronic trading platforms
