= Keith Gill =

American financial analyst and investor (born 1986)

- Born: Keith Patrick Gill; June 8, 1986 (age 40)
- Other names: DeepFuckingValue; Roaring Kitty
- Education: Stonehill College
- Occupations: Former marketer and financial educator for MassMutual; Individual stock trader
- Known for: Involvement in the GameStop short squeeze
- Children: 1

Keith Patrick Gill (born June 8, 1986) is an American financial marketer, educator, and individual investor known for his posts on the subreddits r/wallstreetbets and r/SuperStonk. His analyses of GameStop stock (NYSE: GME) and details of his resulting investment gains — posted on Reddit under the username DeepFuckingValue (DFV) and on YouTube and Twitter as Roaring Kitten — were cited as a driving factor in the GameStop short squeeze of January 2021, and as a spark for the subsequent trading frenzy in retail stocks. The rising stock value allowed Gill to turn an initial US$53,000 investment into $50 million by January 2021. As of June 2024, Gill also owned 9 million Class A shares of Chewy, Inc.

Gill's posts were described as "forthright, spreadsheet-laden content". His Reddit username derives from the investing term deep value, as Gill claims to be a proponent of value investing. Reuters revealed his identity to the public on January 28, 2021, after an investigation of public records and social media posts.

Gill gave testimony as part of a virtual hearing held by the US House Financial Services Committee on February 18, 2021, as part of a discussion about when "short sellers, social media, and retail investors collide". Gill testified he "did not solicit anyone to buy or sell the stock for [his] own profit."

== Early life and education ==
Keith Gill was born on June 8, 1986, to Steven and Elaine Gill, and was raised in Brockton, Massachusetts. He had two siblings, a sister who died unexpectedly in 2020, and a brother.

He graduated from Stonehill College with an accounting degree in 2009 and holds several school records in track and field. Gill was named the indoor athlete of the year in 2008 by the US Track & Field and Cross Country Coaches Association after he won the 1,000-meter race at the New England Championships with a time of 2:24.73, and recorded a personal best time of 4:03 in the mile that year.

== Personal life ==
He married his wife, Caroline, in 2016; they have one child. According to his testimony before Congress, Gill is the first in his family to earn a four-year degree.

== Career ==
Gill was once a Chartered Financial Analyst (CFA) charterholder, but he no longer appears in the CFAI member directory. He was a licensed securities broker registered with the Financial Industry Regulatory Authority (FINRA) from July 2012 with no disclosed regulatory infractions.

Gill was employed by MassMutual starting in 2019, working as a financial marketer and educator. He "helped to create financial education classes that advisors could present to prospective clients", although he "was not a stock broker, or a financial advisor", and "did not talk to clients, and did not recommend stocks for them to buy".

As of February 26, 2021, Gill was no longer a registered financial broker; January 28 was his last day of employment with MassMutual, and a FINRA spokeswoman said, "a person's registration is terminated when he or she is no longer employed by a registered firm." Between 2010 and 2014 he worked for a family friend at a start-up in New Hampshire, working on a software program to help investors analyze stocks. He worked for LexShares until March 2017. Gill was employed at MassMutual in April 2019 until his resignation on January 28, 2021.

== Position in GameStop and other companies ==
=== Position in GameStop ===
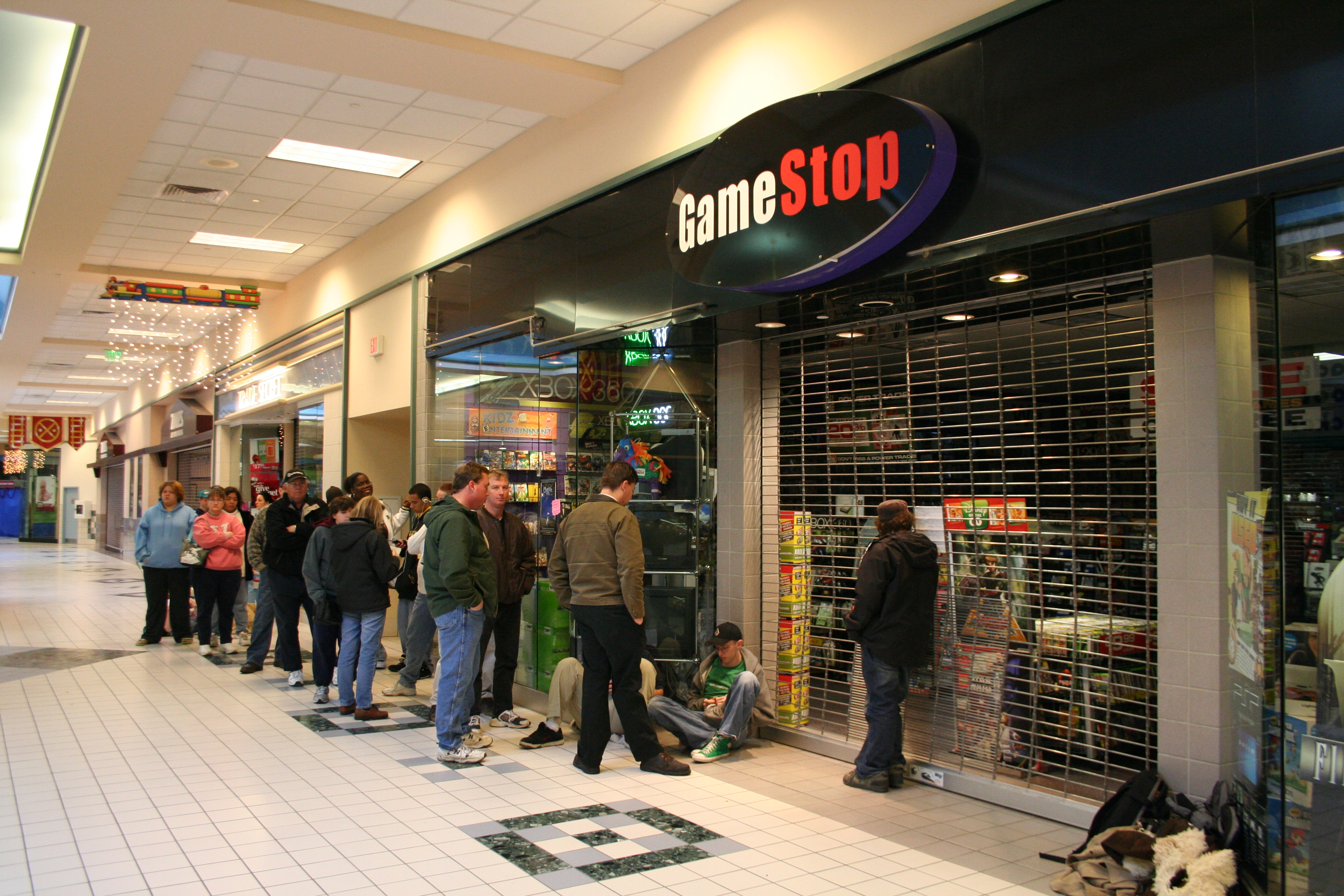
A GameStop store in a mall

In September 2019, Gill, under the username "u/DeepFuckingValue", posted on the subreddit r/wallstreetbets a screenshot of a trade consisting of a roughly $53,000 long position in GameStop; Gill's Reddit posts and YouTube videos argued (through both fundamental and technical analysis) that the stock was undervalued. The position was 50,000 shares and 500 call options. In a YouTube video, he noted that his argument did not constitute financial advice, saying: "I don't provide personal investment advice or stock recommendations during the stream."

Nonetheless, his argument "helped attract a flood of retail cash into GameStop." During the first days of the valuation spike in late January 2021, hundreds of thousands of people downloaded investment apps like Robinhood to "join the action". Ultimately, Gill's investment in the stock of GameStop (which began in June 2019, when the stock was $5 per share) inspired other posters and readers to invest.

Subsequent investment in the stock (and other "meme stocks" such as AMC, BlackBerry, and Nokia) would result in controversy; the 2021 GameStop short squeeze would result in several hedge funds and some institutional investors experiencing significant financial difficulty, as well as many retail investors (and other institutional investors) seeing significant gains. By January 27, according to screenshots he posted on Reddit, Gill's original investment was worth nearly $48 million. However, the value of the stock continued to fluctuate wildly; he lost $15 million in one day, and when markets closed on January 29, The Wall Street Journal confirmed that his brokerage accounts held $33 million. In an interview with The Wall Street Journal, Gill said he "wasn't a rabble-rouser out to take on the establishment, just someone who believes investors can find value in unloved stocks."

After a two-week break from posting regular updates on his position, Gill posted a new screenshot to r/wallstreetbets on February 19, 2021, showing that he had doubled the number of shares of GameStop he held (raising the total to 100,000). On April 16, 2021, he exercised all of his 500 call options with a strike price of $12, which were to expire that same day, and purchased an additional 50,000 shares, increasing his ownership to 200,000 GameStop shares.

=== Regulatory issues ===
On February 4, 2021, it was announced that William Galvin, the Massachusetts Secretary of the Commonwealth, wrote to Gill's previous employer MassMutual to investigate whether or not Gill or the company broke any rules related to his activities in promoting the GameStop stock. A week earlier, Galvin had called for a 30-day suspension of trading in GameStop securities and insisted that the share price was "irrational". Gill testified to the House Financial Services Committee on February 18, 2021, saying: "I did not solicit anyone to buy or sell the stock for my own profit", and "I like the stock." In September 2021, MassMutual was fined $4 million by Massachusetts regulators for failing to supervise Gill's trading and online activity. The consent order entered by Secretary Galvin's office against MassMutual alleged that Gill had executed approximately 1,700 trades on behalf of three other individuals, and appeared to suggest that Gill had engaged in manipulation of GameStop's share price. However, an attorney for Gill said that those trades were executed for "three family members" and that "[l]ess than 5 percent of the trades in those accounts were in GME"—raising speculation that Secretary Galvin's office had selectively omitted detail of Gill's conduct to fit a narrative consistent with the statements he had made in January. In October 2021, the Securities and Exchange Commission released a 45-page report that acknowledged that "People may disagree about the prospects of GameStop and the other meme stocks" and did not indicate that any market manipulation had occurred.

=== Return to social media ===
On May 12, 2024, Gill began posting to X again after a three-year hiatus. On May 13, 2024 GameStop shares opened at $26.34, 50.6% higher from the previous closing price of $17.49. On June 2, 2024, Gill started posting on the r/Superstonk subreddit, showing screenshots of his brokerage account which revealed a long position in excess of $180 million in GameStop Corp., with 5 million shares held and an additional exposure of 12 million shares through call options contracts with a strike price of $20 expiring on June 21, 2024. On June 3, 2024 GameStop shares opened at $40.16, 73.6% higher from the previous closing price of $23.13. On the same day, The Wall Street Journal reported that "E*Trade is considering telling Gill that he can no longer use its platform after growing concerned about potential stock manipulation. No decision has been made and the firm could decide no action is needed". On June 6, 2024, Gill scheduled a livestream on his YouTube channel for the following day, June 7, coinciding with GameStop's surprise early earnings release. GameStop shares rose 47.45% during the trading session of June 6, 2024, opening at $31.57 and closing at $46.55. Gill's position was worth in excess of $585 million at this point. On June 7, 2024 shares opened 19.04% lower at $37.69, and decreased a further 25.13% during the rest of the trading session, closing at $28.22. On June 11, 2024, GameStop announced it completed an at-the-market equity offering of 75 million shares, raising $2.14 billion in cash amid the trading frenzy. On June 13, 2024 the value of Gill's position, according to his screenshots on Reddit, had stood at over $260 million, as he showed ownership of 9 million shares and no options.

On June 24, 2024, Gill acquired a position on about 9 million class A shares of Chewy, Inc., which amounted to 6.6% of the class and would make him the third-largest shareholder of the company. The value of those shares on that day was approximately $245 million. On June 27, 2024, Gill posted a photo of a cartoon dog on his X account and Chewy shares began rising. On July 1, 2024, the position was revealed to the public through a schedule 13G filing with the SEC. Reuters reported that the filing raised concerns among Chewy's executives about the possibility that shareholding asset managers might be deterred by the stock's increased volatility.

== In popular culture ==
Gill is portrayed by Paul Dano in the 2023 film Dumb Money, which dramatizes the events of the GameStop short squeeze. Dano stated that he watched extensive footage of Gill's online streams and videos in preparation for the role.

The film incorporates online terminology associated with the GameStop phenomenon, such as "tendies", a slang term referring to chicken tenders and profits in retail trading culture. Gill and the short squeeze are also examined in the HBO Max documentary miniseries Gaming Wall Street and the Netflix docuseries Eat the Rich: The GameStop Saga.
