= Youtooz =

Canadian toy and collectible company

- Industry: Toys
- Founded: May 28, 2019; 7 years ago
- Founder: Austin Litman; Austin Long; Mark Prokoudine
- Headquarters: Regina, Saskatchewan, Canada
- Website: youtooz.com

Youtooz is a Canadian company that manufactures licensed collectible caricatural vinyl figurines and cotton-stuffed plushies. The company primarily partners with Internet personalities or public figures and memes as a way to create an additional revenue for the partners while also making merchandise available for fans and the public. The company also produces figurines based on video games and established media franchises, and has collaborated with Disney, Paramount Global, NBCUniversal, HBO, Crunchyroll, Sony Pictures, and Viacom.

The company has collaborated with a variety of multimedia personalities, television shows, and imitated memetic art to create a variety of soft plush collectables.

== History ==
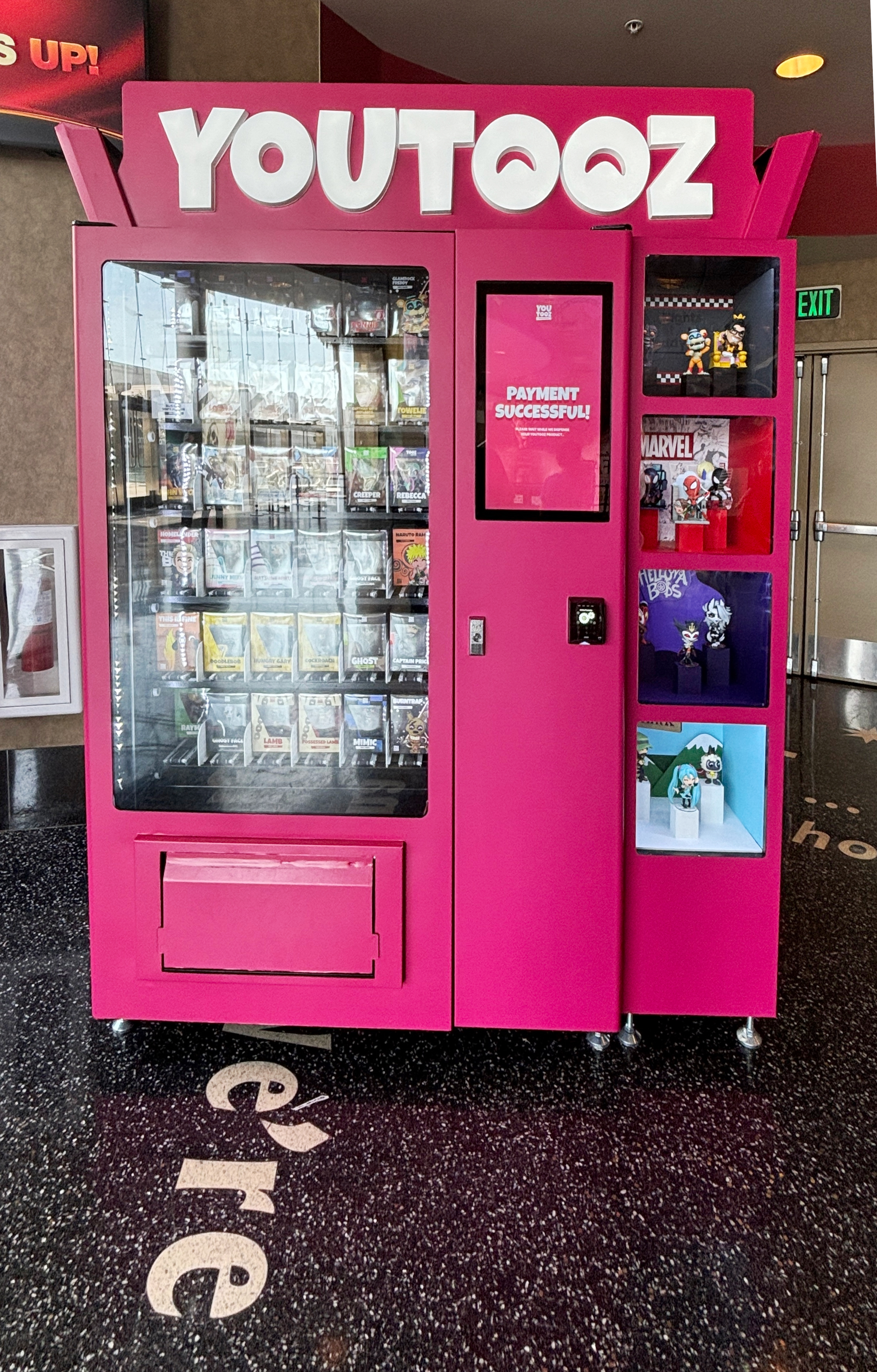
Youtooz vending machine, Los Angeles

Youtooz was co-founded by Austin Litman, Austin Long, and Mark Prokoudine in 2019. The company's first released figurine was "Dead Meme," which was based on Ugandan Knuckles, an Internet meme.

The company launched over 200 figures and sold over 500,000 individual figurines in 2020.

Youtooz had a revenue of over US$30 million in 2021 and released almost 400 new designs, including a "stonks guy" figurine.

== See also ==
- Bearbrick – Japanese collectible toy
- Figma (toy) – Japanese line of action figures
- Funko – American toy company
- Nendoroid – Line of plastic figures
