= Meme stock =

Equity trading driven by social media references

A meme stock is a stock that gains popularity among retail investors through social media. The popularity of meme stocks is generally based on internet memes shared among traders, on platforms such as Reddit's r/wallstreetbets. Investors in such stocks are often young and inexperienced investors. As a result of their popularity, meme stocks often trade at prices that are above their estimated value – as based on fundamental analysis – and are known for being extremely speculative and volatile.

== History ==
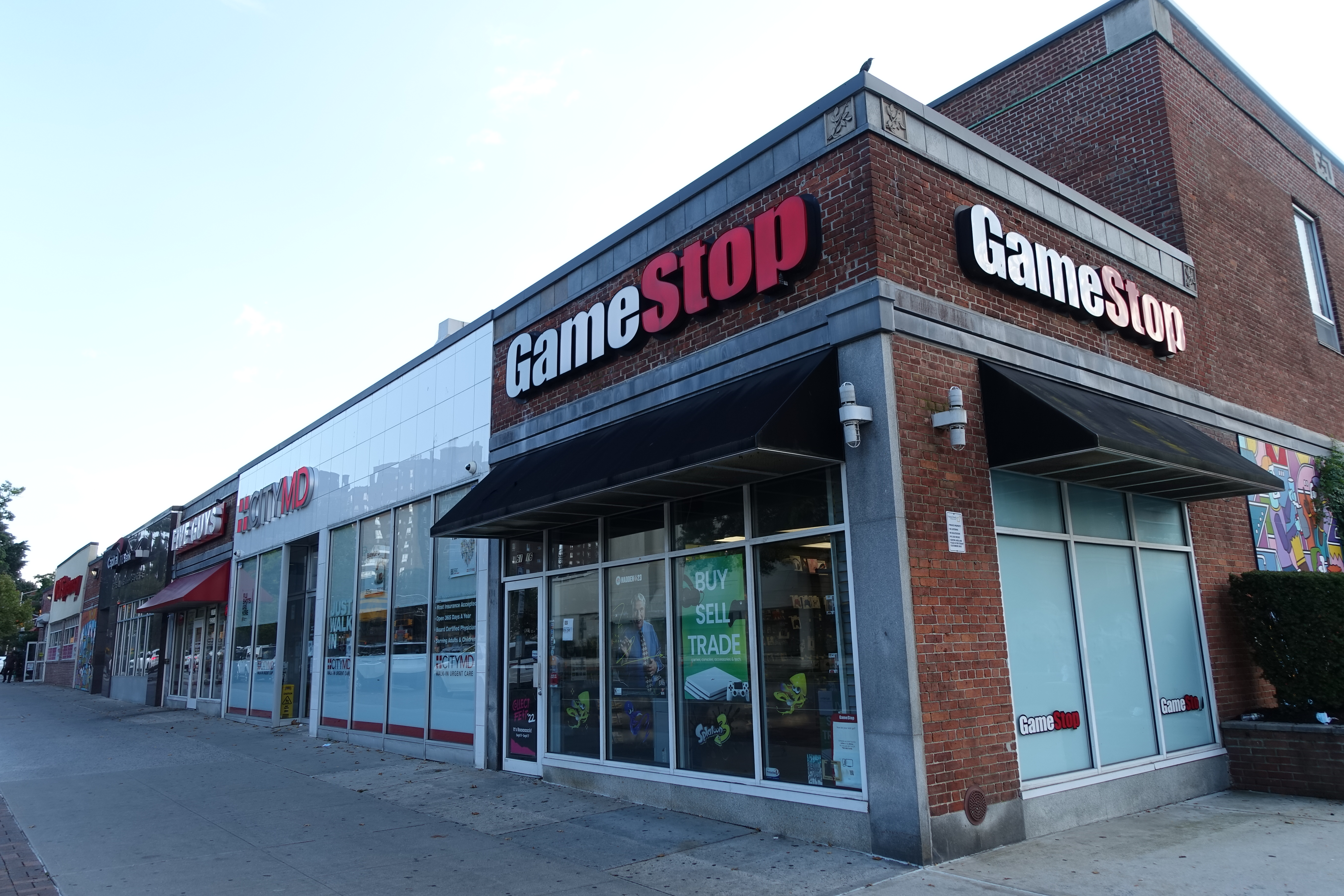
A GameStop store facade in Queens, New York City

Interest in meme stocks started in 2020, in what the U.S. Securities and Exchange Commission has called a "meme stock phenomenon". The stock of American video game retailer GameStop has been one of the most popular meme stocks, with mass purchases of the stock leading to a short squeeze on GameStop in early 2021. The stock of the entertainment company AMC is also cited as a prominent example. Other examples include the stocks of Bed, Bath & Beyond, National Beverage, and Koss. The distinction between a meme stock and a non-meme stock is not always clear; for example, Tesla has some of the characteristics of a meme stock: a high price-earnings ratio and being frequently discussed by amateur retail traders on social media, yet some professional analysts do not consider it to be overpriced.

Interest in meme stocks is associated with the trading platform Robinhood, which pioneered commission-free trading. According to The New York Times, "Robinhood was the tool of choice for traders in the original meme stocks".

Some meme stocks have often become popular among retail investors after being targeted by short-selling professional investors, such as hedge funds, with participants having the explicit aim of causing losses among those firms. News coverage has described the choice to purchase such stocks as an act of rebellion intended to humble short-selling professional investors.

According to an SEC report, while some hedge funds had big losses, the meme stocks phenomenon did not widely impact hedge funds. The SEC staff report also stated, "some investors that had been invested in the target stocks prior to the market events benefited unexpectedly from the price rises, while others, including quantitative and high-frequency hedge funds, joined the market rally to trade profitably." By June 2021, according to Financial Times, some hedge funds were systematically analyzing meme stocks.

On July 5, 2024 Reddit users speculated that Keith Gill, who was previously involved in the GameStop meme stock fad, was about to invest in headphone maker Koss Corporation around July 4 (US Independence Day) after a May post by him in which a microphone emoji appeared with a US flag on the backdrop. As a result of the speculation, a single Koss share rose to $18.50 before ending at $13.35 in that day's session.

== See also ==
- Day trading – Buying and selling financial instruments within the same trading day
- Do-it-yourself investing – Self-directed approach to investment
- Dogecoin – Cryptocurrency
- Fear of missing out – Feeling of worry about lost opportunities
- Meme coin – Cryptocurrency originating from internet meme
- Meme man – Surreal meme character
- YOLO (aphorism) – Acronym for "you only live once"
