= Public Holdings, Inc. =

American financial technology company

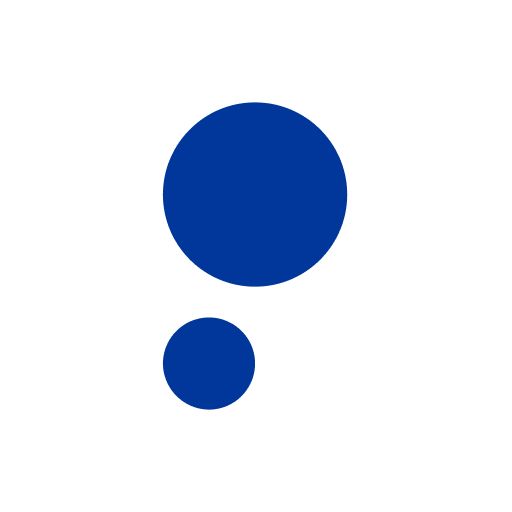
- Trade name: Public.com
- Company type: Privately held company
- Industry: Financial services
- Founded: 2019; 7 years ago
- Founders: Leif Abraham; Jannick Malling
- Headquarters: New York City, United States
- Products: Electronic trading platform
- Services: Stockbroker
- Number of employees: 150+
- Website: public.com

Public Holdings, Inc. (doing business as Public or Public.com) is an American financial technology company headquartered in New York City that offers an electronic trading platform to trade financial assets.

== History ==
Public was launched in 2019 by Leif Abraham and Jannick Malling. In February 2021, Public announced the discontinuation of payment for order flow (PFOF) as a revenue source for equities trades, instead asking customers for gratuities. That month, the company launched advertising featuring Michael Bolton singing a revised version of his song "How Am I Supposed to Live Without You" targeting PFOF.

In October 2021, Public began offering trading in cryptocurrency, initially launching with ten coins and tokens, including Bitcoin and Ethereum. In July 2023, Public launched in the United Kingdom. In December 2023, the platform began offering trading in bonds, becoming the first to offer fractional bond investments. It also launched a Treasury account feature that was meant to simplify the process of buying T-bills.

In January 2024, Public launched options trading with a rebate offering that reduced members' transaction costs to below $0. In August 2024, Public launched an automated account that allows people to invest in 10 corporate bonds to lock in yields higher than US Treasuries.

In November 2024, Public launched margin investing for its users. In October 2025, Public launched direct indexing for retail investors with a minimum investment of $1,000. In November 2025, Public announced what it calls an "Agentic Brokerage," a three-part AI system designed to let retail investors create custom stock indexes using plain-language commands and, eventually, manage their entire portfolios through automated agents.

=== Acquisitions ===
In January 2022, Public acquired Hypercharts, a stock-data visualization platform. In March, it acquired Otis, a platform that allowed members to invest in fractional shares of alternative assets such as fine art and collectibles.

In April 2024, Public acquired the TradeApp brokerage accounts from Stocktwits. In August, Public acquired Carta's startup stock marketplace accounts; Carta had faced backlash for using private data to broker a sale of one of its customers. In November 2025, Public acquired the crypto IRA business of Alto, paying approximately $65 million in cash and stock to offer cryptocurrency trading within tax-advantaged IRA accounts.

=== Financing ===
In March 2020, the company raised a $15 million Series B round led by Accel and Greycroft, with participation from Dreamers VC, founded by Will Smith and Keisuke Honda; J. J. Watt; Shari Redstone's Advancit Capital; Sophia Amoruso, Casey Neistat; Scott Belsky, and Morgan DeBaun. In December 2020, the company raised a $65 million Series C round led by Accel and including Lakestar Greycroft, Shari Redstone's Advancit Capital as well as Tony Hawk and the Chainsmokers, through their Mantis venture capital fund. In February 2021, the company raised $220 million at a $1.2 billion valuation from existing investors including Greycroft, Accel, Tiger Global Management, and Inspired Capital.

== See also ==
- List of electronic trading platforms
