= Payment for order flow =

Compensation that a broker receives

Payment for order flow (PFOF) is the compensation that a stockbroker receives from a market maker in exchange for the broker routing its clients' trades to that market maker. The market maker profits from the spread (the difference between purchase price and sale price) and rebates a portion of this profit to the routing broker as PFOF. Some of this benefit may be passed on to the retail customer as price improvement, often measured in fractions of a cent per share.

PFOF was a key factor in the elimination of most brokerage commissions primarily in the United States and parts of Europe (see analysis below).

PFOF is a controversial practice that has been called a "kickback" by its critics. It is criticized for culminating in conflict of interests and reducing market transparency. On the other hand, policymakers supportive of PFOF and several people in finance who have a favorable view of the practice have defended it for funding new investment apps, low-cost trading, and more efficient execution.

Payment for order flow between the customer, broker, and wholesaler

== Legality and usage ==
=== United States ===
In the United States, accepting PFOF is allowed only if no other exchange is quoting a better price on the National Market System. The broker must disclose to the client that it accepts PFOF. Transactions must be executed at the best execution, which could mean the best price available or the speediest execution available.

Market makers including Citadel LLC, Virtu Financial, and Susquehanna International Group pay PFOF. Brokers in the United States that accept PFOF include Robinhood Markets, E-Trade, Ally Financial, Webull, TradeStation, tastytrade, and Charles Schwab Corporation, while brokers that do not receive PFOF include Interactive Brokers (pro accounts that are charged commissions), Merrill Edge, Fidelity Investments, and The Vanguard Group.

==== Within organizations ====
At the brokerage level, PFOF has fundamentally restructured how firms generate revenue. Rather than charging clients directly, brokers monetize the act of routing, essentially selling access to their customer base to market makers. In some cases, PFOF accounted for over 60% of a brokerage's revenue. Lexology Robinhood is the most extreme example (see below).

On the market maker side, firms like Citadel Securities and Virtu Financial use a process called internalization where wholesalers typically execute orders in house in an internalization process, which fills orders with the firm's own inventory of stocks, allowing wholesalers to make money through spreads. Essentially, instead of sending your order to a public exchange to find a counterparty, the market maker itself takes the other side of your trade, pocketing the spread.

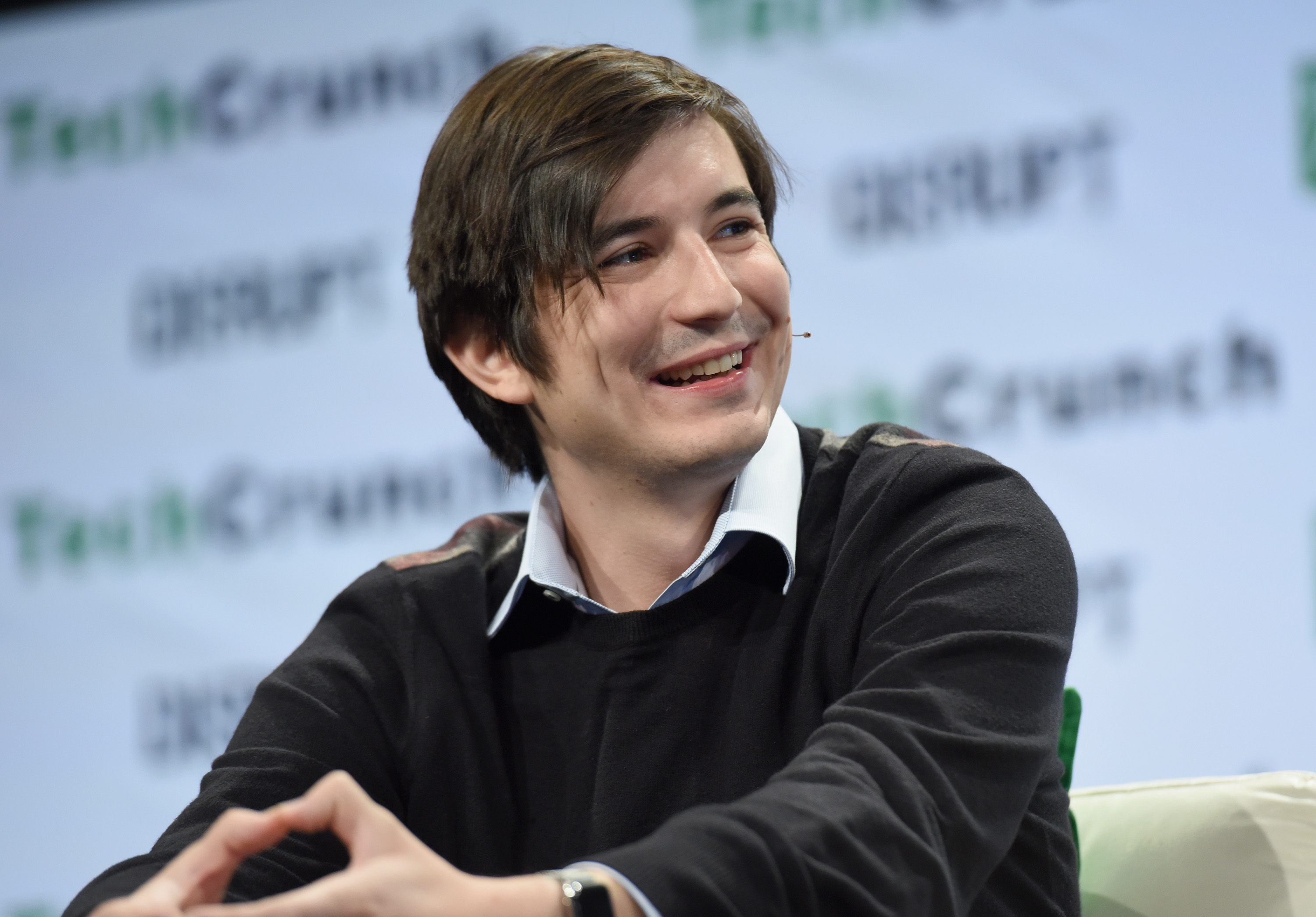
Co-founder of Robinhood Markets Vladimir Tenev. His company became known for helping pioneer commission-free trading by relying on PFOF.

In 2014, broker-dealer Robinhood Markets introduced no-commission retail stock trades funded by PFOF. In 2021, transaction-based revenues (primarily PFOF) were responsible for over 77% of Robinhood's net revenue, with its $1.4 billion in transaction-based revenues split across options (49%), crypto assets (30%), and equities (21%). Other retail brokerages followed Robinhood's footsteps, and in 2020, PFOF received by stockbrokers totaled $2.5 billion. A 2014 investigation by the United States Senate Homeland Security Permanent Subcommittee on Investigations, led by Carl Levin, conducted hearings focused on the conflicts of interest inherent in PFOF. At the hearings, an executive for TD Ameritrade said that it routes orders to wherever it can get the highest payment.

In January 2021, after the GameStop short squeeze, officials again questioned whether retail traders were getting the best possible prices on their orders. Brokers sold their orders in bulk to market makers that executed the trades, a practice that came under scrutiny during the GameStop short squeeze and subsequent meme stock events. Certain platforms, such as Public.com, announced that they would abandon PFOF and add Safety Labels to stocks rather than halt trading.

==== Disclosure requirements and regulations ====
U.S. Securities and Exchange Commission rule 606(a), implemented in 2001, require all brokerage firms to make publicly available quarterly reports describing their order routing practices. This report discloses the "payment for order flow" practices. The report provides transparency in this area, allowing investors to understand how their orders are routed and executed, and to identify any potential conflicts of interest. Broker-dealers must disclose the nature of any compensation received in return for routing orders, as well as the overall process they use for order routing decisions. By mandating this disclosure, the reports mandated by 606(a) aim to enhance the integrity of the market and protect investor interests.

The genesis of Rule 606(a) can be traced back to increased complexity in how orders were routed and executed, raising concerns about transparency and fairness, after the increased usage of electronic trading platforms. In response, the SEC introduced Rule 606 (formerly Rule 11Ac1-6) under the Securities Exchange Act of 1934, aiming to address these concerns. The rule has undergone several amendments to keep pace with the evolving market structure, technological advancements, and trading practices.

One of the significant updates to this rule was in 2018, where the SEC adopted amendments to enhance the transparency of order handling practices. These amendments expanded the scope of the original rule, leading to what is currently known as Rule 606(a).

In December 2022, the SEC voted 3–2 to propose a new Rule 615 under Regulation NMS, known as the "order competition rule," which would have required most retail marketable orders to be exposed in brief open auctions before any wholesaler could execute them. The proposal was part of a broader four-rule equity market structure overhaul and was estimated by the SEC to potentially generate $1.5 billion in annual savings for retail investors, though that figure was disputed by industry commentators. The rule was ultimately withdrawn in 2025, under SEC Chair Paul Atkins, as part of a broader rollback of pending market structure proposals. By that time, market concentration had grown substantially: the top three wholesalers: Citadel Securities, Virtu Financial, and G1 Execution Services of which handled more than 80% of U.S. retail equity market orders, and the 12 largest U.S. brokerages collectively earned $3.8 billion in PFOF revenue in 2021 alone.

In 2024, the SEC implemented new rules requiring better disclosure from brokers about their execution quality.

=== Canada ===
In Canada, PFOF is not allowed on Canadian listed securities, so Canadian brokers charge commissions. However, according to current Canadian securities regulations, brokers can accept PFOF on non-Canadian listed securities.

=== Europe ===
PFOF is effectively prohibited in the United Kingdom, where the Financial Conduct Authority has said the practice is generally incompatible with inducements and best-execution rules. It is also banned in the European Union (EU). Although Robinhood UK routes UK customer trades to its U.S. affiliate, Robinhood Securities, LLC (RHS), for order execution, Robinhood UK says that RHS does not receive payment for order flow on UK customer orders and that Robinhood UK receives no remuneration for routing those orders.

The EU ban took formal legal effect on March 28, 2024, when amendments to the Markets in Financial Instruments Regulation (MiFIR) were published in the Official Journal of the EU and became directly applicable across all Member States. However, a grandfathering clause permits individual Member States to allow investment firms to continue receiving PFOF temporarily if they were operating before March 28, 2024. Germany, for instance, passed legislation allowing firms to continue receiving PFOF for domestic clients until June 30, 2026.

=== Australia ===
PFOF is banned in Australia and not allowed by market participants per the Australian Securities and Investments Commission (ASIC).

However, ASIC identified that its rules do not deal with certain PFOF scenarios. These are arrangements between non-market participant intermediaries, and has proposed amendments to close this regulatory gap.

=== Other regions ===
There is not a large amount of publicly available data covering PFOF within stock exchanges in regions other than which are stated above. PFOF is primarily used in the United States.

== History ==
PFOF dates back to at least 1984 as noted in the 1993 remarks of Richard Y. Roberts, Commissioner, U.S. Securities and Exchange Commission (SEC), entitled "Payment for Order Flow" in regards to a letter from Richard G. Ketchum, Director, Division of Market Regulation, SEC, to John E. Pinto, Senior Vice President, NASD, dated October 5, 1984:

When the Commission first became aware of payment for order flow practices in the OTC market in late 1984, the Division of Market Regulation ("Division") wrote to the National Association of Securities Dealers ("NASD") to express its concerns and to request that the NASD "consider possible measures to address any problems observed in this area". In the ensuing years, the Commission has requested information from the NASD and the exchanges to determine the extent of payment for order flow practices.

== Analysis ==
=== Conflicts of interest ===
Payment for order flow has been described as a conflict of interest. PFOF can cause executable orders not to get executed because brokerage firms receive payments from third parties for directing client orders to them. This incentivizes the firms to choose the third party offering the highest amount back to the firm.

=== Lower commissions and fees, price improvement ===
Since retail orders have a lower chance of adverse selection for the market maker, they are more profitable for the market maker. These savings are passed on in part to the broker as PFOF, but also to the retail customer as price improvement: market makers often fill retail orders at a better price than the best price available on public exchanges. The additional revenue for brokers allows them to charge minimal or no commissions. PFOF was a key factor in elimination of most brokerage commissions in the United States.

=== Increase in market liquidity and competition ===
Several favorable views about PFOF have claimed that PFOF increases market liquidity and thus reduces the bid–ask spread. Bernard Madoff, an electronic stock trading pioneer and later convicted fraudster, was a staunch supporter of PFOF and claimed that by routing orders away from the New York Stock Exchange, PFOF increased competition.

=== Academic research ===
Research published in August 2022 by Christopher Schwarz of the University of California at Irvine, Brad Barber of the University of California, Davis and Terence Odean of the University of California, Berkeley argued that this practice does not appear to affect price execution in a detrimental way for the retail customer. According to the study, the market makers give better pricing on a particular stock than the figures quoted on stock exchanges and by doing so retail traders get slightly more per share when selling, and pay slightly less when buying.

However, this study only considered stock trades and PFOF is larger on options. Those concerned about possible conflicts of interest note that retail trading of options has increased sharply since PFOF became widespread.

Earlier theoretical research by Christine A. Parlour and Uday Rajan, published in the Journal of Financial Economics in 2003, analyzed PFOF within a market microstructure framework. Their model investigated how competition among market makers for retail orders can affect spreads, execution quality, and broker incentives. They ultimately had the goal of finding out whether PFOF actually hurts small investors. The researchers found that for regular stock trades, retail investors usually still get good prices and at times market makers give them slightly better prices than what was quoted on public exchanges at the time. PFOF can arise as an equilibrium outcome when market makers compete for uniformed retail orders, which are generally less subjected to adverse selection. In their framework, payments to brokers may coexist with competitive pricing for investors as market makers earn profits from the order flow and pass part of those profits back to brokers.

Rajan and Parlour highlighted potential conflict of interests caused by the payments received by market makers. Brokers may have the incentive to make routing decisions based on compensation rather than execution quality.
