= Max Deml =

German-Austrian journalist, publisher, and entrepreneur (born 1957)

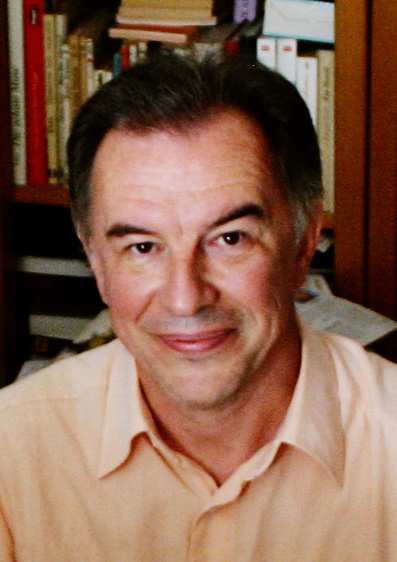
- Deml in 2010
- Born: 27 August 1957 (age 68); Stamsried, West Germany
- Occupations: Journalist, publisher, entrepreneur
- Years active: 1990–present
- Website: Official website

Max Deml (born 27 August 1957) is a German-Austrian journalist, publisher, and entrepreneur.

Since 1991, he has been editor-in-chief of Ökoinvest, a German-language stock market newsletter that focuses on green investments and renewable energies such as solar power. Deml developed the Natur-Aktien-Index (Nx-25) in 1997; the index was established in its modern form in 2003.

== Career ==
Deml studied psychology, philosophy, and political science in Regensburg, Germany, before continuing his studies in Vienna, Austria.

Deml founded Öko-Invest Verlag (publishing house) in 1991. He co-founded several companies in green finance and organic food, including BioArt AG. Since 1990, he has co-authored the handbook Grünes Geld (Green Money).

In 2020, Deml received the Austrian SDG Award in the media category from the Senat der Wirtschaft.

Since 2012, Deml has performed a German-language financial cabaret programme, Grünes Geld und Frische Blüten (Green Money and Fresh Dough).
