= Undervalued stock =

An undervalued stock is defined as a stock that is selling at a price significantly below what is assumed to be its intrinsic value. For example, if a stock is selling for $50, but it is worth $100 based on predictable future cash flows, then it is an undervalued stock. The undervalued stock has the intrinsic value below the investment's true intrinsic value.

Numerous popular books discuss undervalued stocks. Examples are The Intelligent Investor by Benjamin Graham, also known as "The Dean of Wall Street," and The Warren Buffett Way by Robert Hagstrom. The Intelligent Investor puts forth Graham's principles that are based on mathematical calculations such as the price/earning ratio. He was less concerned with the qualitative aspects of a business such as the nature of a business, its growth potential and its management. For example, Amazon, Facebook, Netflix and Tesla in 2016, although they had a promising future, would not have appealed to Graham, since their price-earnings ratios were too high. Graham's ideas had a significant influence on the young Warren Buffett, who later became a famous US billionaire.

== Determining factors ==
Morningstar uses five factors to determine when something is a value stock, namely:

- price/prospective earnings (a predictive version of price/earnings ratio sometimes called Forward P/E.)
- price/book
- price/sales
- price/cash flow
- dividend yield

Warren Buffett, also known as "The Oracle of Omaha," stated that the value of a business is the sum of the cash flows over the life of the business discounted at an appropriate interest rate. This is in reference to the ideas of John Burr Williams. Therefore, one would not be able to predict whether a stock is undervalued without predicting the future profits of a company and future interest rates. Buffett stated that he is interested in predictable businesses and he uses the interest rate on the 10-year treasury bond in his calculations. Therefore, an investor has to be fairly certain that a company will be profitable in the future in order to consider it to be undervalued. For example, if a risky stock has a PE ratio of 5 and the company becomes bankrupt, this would not be an undervalued stock. Some qualities of companies with undervalued stocks are:

1. The company's earning history is stable.
2. The company does not specialize in high-technology that can become obsolete overnight.
3. The company is not in the middle of some financial scandal.
4. The company's low PE ratio is not due to profits realized from capital gains.
5. The company's low PE ratio is not due to a major decline in profitability.
6. The company's PE ratio is below its average PE ratio for the last 10 years.
7. The company is selling at a price below its tangible asset value.
8. The company's trailing 3-years earnings has risen over the past 10 years.
9. The company's credit rating is AAA, AA, or A, or even better, there is no rating because there is no debt at all.
10. The company did not have a loss during the last recession.
11. The company's PEG ratio is low. A Price/Earnings/Growth rate below 1 means the PE ratio is less than the growth rate.

An excellent stock at a fair price is more likely to be undervalued than is a poor stock at a low price, according to Charles Munger, the Harvard-educated partner of Buffett. An excellent stock continues to rise in value over the long term, while a poor stock declines in value. An undervalued stock will usually have a low PE ratio. For example, a PE ratio of 10 is much better than a PE ratio of 20. Some high-flying Internet stocks had PE ratios of 30, 40, 50, 100, 200 or more in year 2000, prior to the bursting of the Internet stock bubble. Investors of these Internet stocks did not purchase undervalued stocks, as they later learned.

== See also ==
- Stock valuation
- Value investing
- Penny stock
- Multibagger stock
