= Webull =

U.S. financial services company

Webull Corporation
- Type: Public
- Traded as: Nasdaq: BULL (Class A)
- Industry: Financial services
- Founded: 2016; 10 years ago
- Founders: Wang Anquan
- Headquarters: St. Petersburg, Florida, U.S.
- Key people: Wang Anquan (chairman and CEO), Anthony Denier (President)
- Products: Electronic trading platform
- Services: Stockbroker
- Owner: Wang Anquan; General Atlantic; Coatue Management; Lightspeed Venture Partners; J. Rothschild Capital Management; Gopher Asset Management
- Website: www.webull.com

Webull Corporation, commonly known as Webull, is an American financial services holding company headquartered in St. Petersburg, Florida. It owns and operates the Webull electronic trading platform for retail investors.

Webull began operations in 2016 under Hunan Fumi Information Technology, a China-based financial technology company founded by Wang Anquan. It launched U.S. brokerage services through Webull Financial LLC in 2018 and expanded during the retail-trading boom of 2020 and 2021. In April 2025, Webull became a publicly traded company on the Nasdaq through a merger with special-purpose acquisition company.

== History ==
=== Founding ===
Webull was founded in 2016 under Hunan Fumi Information Technology, a China-based financial technology company, by Wang Anquan, a former employee of Alibaba Group and Xiaomi. Hunan Fumi Information Technology received backing from Xiaomi, Shunwei Capital, and other investors in China. Fumi Technology was a Hunan-based fintech start-up incubated by Xiaomi and raised about CNY200 million (approximately US$30 million) in a Series B financing round in 2018.

On May 24, 2017, Webull Financial LLC was established as a Delaware limited liability company. It began offering brokerage services in the United States in May 2018. Wang hired Anthony Denier as CEO of the U.S. brokerage that year and the two mapped out their strategy on napkins at a Mexican restaurant in New York City. Webull Corporation was incorporated in the Cayman Islands in September 2019 as the group's holding company.

In 2019, Anthony Denier, then Webull's U.S. chief executive, described Webull as "both a U.S. and Chinese company".

=== Retail trading boom ===
In May 2020, the company received SEC approval to launch a robo-advisor on its platform. By August 2020, the platform had over 11 million registered users, and in October 2020, it had 750,000 daily active users.

Webull introduced options trading in 2020 and later added cryptocurrency trading through a separate digital-asset business. In November 2020, Webull began supporting cryptocurrency transactions. In December 2020, Webull launched trading services in Hong Kong.

During the GameStop short squeeze in January 2021, Webull gained attention as some retail traders looked for alternatives to Robinhood. On January 27, 2021, Webull recorded its highest-ever number of active daily users, at 952,000, and the Webull app was downloaded across the Apple App and Google Play stores an estimated 100,000 times. That week, approximately 1.2 million people downloaded the Webull mobile app, which the company reported as a 1,548% week-over-week increase. On January 28, 2021, Webull was directed by its clearing house to temporarily halt buy orders for stocks affected by the GameStop short squeeze.

In June 2021, Webull was reported to be considering a U.S. initial public offering that could raise up to $400 million.

=== Restructuring and expansion ===
Webull restructured its China-related corporate arrangements in 2022 and later stated that Hunan Fumi was no longer affiliated with the group.

In 2022 and 2023, Webull expanded in several non-U.S. markets, including Singapore, Australia, South Africa, Japan, the United Kingdom and Indonesia.

Webull stated that its former variable interest entity arrangements with Hunan Fumi and other China-based entities were terminated in August 2022 and that Hunan Fumi is no longer affiliated with the group. The restructuring did not end concerns about the company's China-based operations.

In March 2023, the Financial Industry Regulatory Authority (FINRA) fined Webull Financial LLC US$3 million over its approval of customers for options trading and its handling of customer complaints. FINRA said Webull approved more than 2,500 customers under the age of 21 for a level of options trading that required three years of options-trading experience. FINRA also said programming errors led Webull to approve more than 9,000 options accounts even though the customers did not meet the firm's criteria.

In June 2023, Webull moved cryptocurrency trading to a separate app called Webull Pay. By the end of 2023, Webull had 4.3 million funded accounts and US$8.2 billion in customer assets. In January 2024, Anthony Denier was promoted to group president of Webull Corporation. In November 2024, Webull launched overnight, or extended-hours, trading, expanding the trading window of U.S. stocks for users inside and outside the United States.

In June 2023, Tommy Tuberville led a bipartisan group of U.S. senators in introducing legislation that would bar Chinese-owned companies from owning or controlling cryptocurrency exchanges in the United States. The bill named Webull among the companies covered by the proposal.

In November 2023, the Massachusetts Securities Division fined Webull US$500,000 for compliance failures as its customer base grew rapidly. The regulator said Webull failed to keep up with customer complaints, regulator inquiries and internal oversight. Webull agreed to hire an independent compliance consultant and conduct annual compliance reviews for three years.

=== Public company ===
On February 28, 2024, Webull agreed to go public through a business combination with SK Growth Opportunities Corporation (NASDAQ: SKGR), a special-purpose acquisition company, in a deal that valued the company at approximately US$7.3 billion. The proposed valuation drew scrutiny because of Webull's limited financial disclosure at announcement, reliance on payment for order flow and small expected public float.

In April 2024, attorneys general from 14 U.S. states launched an inquiry into Webull's handling of U.S. customer data and its historical ownership and operations in China. The inquiry was initiated by Indiana Attorney General Todd Rokita and focused on whether Webull had adequate protections for sensitive investor data from the Chinese Communist Party. In June 2024, Tennessee banned Webull on government-issued devices, citing security risks related to its ties to China.

In November 2024, the U.S. Securities and Exchange Commission fined Webull Financial US$125,000 over incomplete suspicious activity reports. The SEC said Webull's reports omitted required information about suspicious transactions.

In November 2024, the United States House Select Committee on Strategic Competition between the United States and the Chinese Communist Party sent Webull a letter requesting information about its ownership structure, relationships with Hunan Weibu and Hunan Fumi, data-security controls and access to U.S. user data. In its 2025 annual filing, Webull warned that continued government scrutiny over its China ties and data-security practices could adversely affect its business.

SK Growth shareholders approved the business combination on March 30, 2025, and the transaction closed on April 10, 2025. Webull's Class A ordinary shares and warrants began trading on the Nasdaq on April 11, 2025, under the ticker symbols BULL and BULLW (incentive warrants traded under BULLZ until their redemption in June 2025). The merger brought Webull to the public market but generated little cash for the company: after shareholder redemptions, Webull disclosed net proceeds of US$430,066 from the transaction.

After the listing, Webull's shares experienced extreme volatility, rising as much as 500% to US$79.56 on April 14, 2025, after closing at US$13.25 on the prior trading day. The initial post-listing surge increased the value of Webull holdings owned by earlier investors, including RIT Capital Partners, which had first invested in Webull in 2021. In April 2026, after Webull's shares had fallen about 70% over the previous year, the company authorized a US$100 million share repurchase program.

In July 2025, FINRA fined Webull Financial LLC US$1.6 million over failures involving social-media marketing, customer disclosures and trading controls. FINRA said Webull failed to properly supervise and keep records of paid social-media promotions, some of which made exaggerated claims or did not fairly present investment risks. The case also covered required customer disclosures, market-data display and controls for erroneous orders.

In its 2025 annual filing, Webull said its mainland China operations were limited to research and development and technical support, while its China-based subsidiary Hunan Weibu Information Technology Co., Ltd. employed 863 people, or about 62% of Webull's workforce, as of December 31, 2025. The filing also stated that founder Wang Anquan, a citizen of the People's Republic of China, controlled about 79.2% of Webull's voting power as of March 31, 2026.

On October 7, 2026, the U.S. House Select Committee on Strategic Competition between the United States and the Chinese Communist Party issued a report stating that the company was linked with the Chinese government and that this was a U.S. security risk. In November 2026, FINRA fined Webull US$4.2 million, citing anti-money laundering compliance deficiencies.

== Business model and financials ==
Webull provides a self-directed electronic trading platform available through mobile, desktop and web applications. Depending on jurisdiction, the platform offers trading in stocks, exchange-traded funds, options, margin, futures, fixed income products, cryptocurrency, cash management features and market data tools. In the United States, Webull Financial LLC is a registered broker-dealer and member of FINRA and the Securities Investor Protection Corporation, while Webull operates in other markets through locally licensed brokerage subsidiaries.

Webull operates a commission-free or low-cost brokerage model for self-directed retail investors. In the United States, a substantial part of its trading-related revenue comes from payment for order flow, while in some non-U.S. markets the company more commonly charges commissions directly to customers. The platform is aimed at more active retail investors, including users seeking options tools, extended-hours trading and real-time market data.

For 2025, Webull reported total revenue of US$571.0 million, up from US$390.2 million in 2024. Equity and option order-flow rebates accounted for US$304.1 million, or 53.3% of revenue, making order-flow rebates the company's largest reported revenue category. Interest-related income accounted for US$154.3 million, handling charge income for US$87.3 million and other revenue for US$25.3 million.

Options were the larger component of the company's order-flow rebates in 2025, generating US$210.0 million compared with US$94.2 million from equities. Webull also generates revenue from interest-related activities, including margin financing, customer bank deposits, stock lending and corporate bank deposits. The company has stated that its interest-related income is affected by interest rates, customer cash balances, margin balances and demand for stock lending.

The company had approximately 20 million registered users worldwide as of February 2024. As of December 31, 2025, it reported 26.8 million registered users, 5.0 million funded accounts and US$24.6 billion in customer assets. As of March 2025, Webull operated in Hong Kong, Singapore, Australia, South Africa, Japan, the United Kingdom, the United States, Indonesia, Canada, Brazil, Thailand, Malaysia and Mexico.

== Marketing and sponsorships ==
Webull has used paid digital advertising, referral incentives, free-stock promotions, affiliate marketing and sports sponsorships to acquire customers and promote its brand. In its 2025 annual filing, the company reported marketing and branding expenses of US$152.3 million in 2023, US$138.7 million in 2024 and US$135.9 million in 2025. Webull said most of its advertising and promotion costs were related to paid search and paid social advertising, and that it had reduced free-stock promotions while shifting toward deposit- and asset-transfer-based incentives.

In September 2021, BSE Global, the parent company of the Brooklyn Nets and New York Liberty, entered into a global multi-year agreement with Webull. SportsPro valued the agreement as a US$30 million jersey-patch deal, while CNBC cited people familiar with the agreement as saying it paid the Nets roughly US$30 million per year. Webull later disclosed a total sponsorship fee commitment of US$90 million and said the agreement ended in September 2024. In April 2025, Webull announced a sponsorship deal with the Tampa Bay Rays.

== See also ==
- List of electronic trading platforms
- List of financial market information services
