= Multibagger stock =

High-return equity stock

A multibagger stock is an equity stock which gives a return of more than 100%. The term was coined by Peter Lynch in his 1988 book One Up on Wall Street and comes from baseball where "bags" or "bases" that a runner reaches are the measure of the success of a play. For example, a ten bagger is a stock which gives returns equal to 10 times the investment, while a twenty bagger stock gives a return of 20 times.

This term is especially common when discussing high-growth industries and emerging markets such as the BRICS. As with most investment metrics, past performance is no guarantee of future returns, and multibag returns may be indicative of either sustained growth or an investment bubble.
