= Meme Man =

Surreal meme character

In-universe information
- Alias: Stonks Man
- Gender: Male

Meme Man, sometimes also referred to as Mr. Succ or the Stonks guy, is a character often featured in internet memes. He is depicted as a 3D render of a smooth, bald, pale-skinned, and often disembodied blue-eyed male head. He was popularized in the mid-2010s by the artist "Special meme fresh" and became a common character in many surreal memes, a genre of internet humor inspired by surrealism. During the 2021 GameStop short squeeze, Meme Man was popularized by users of the subreddit r/wallstreetbets as the face of the "stonks" meme.

The first usage of him as a recurring character was on the Facebook page of the artist "Special meme fresh" starting in 2014, and soon the character spread to become "one of the only consistent stylistic elements" of the surreal memes aesthetic. On June 5, 2017, the artist uploaded an image of Meme Man overlaid on top of a stock photo of a man in a business suit with arms crossed and a chart pointing upwards behind him, and the caption "Stonks", a deliberate misspelling of the word "stocks". The meme went viral and became a common reaction image on Reddit and Twitter.

On February 1, 2019, Elon Musk bought the domain name "stankmemes.com" according to his tweet. In June 2020, when Tesla Inc. shares soared, he tweeted "stonks", and the website featured this meme.

Elon Musk has used both Meme Man and the "stonks" meme as a reaction on Twitter, and on January 26, 2021, he tweeted the word "Gamestonk!!" with an attached link to r/wallstreetbets. Immediately afterwards, shares in GameStop rose 157 percent in extended-hours trading, which some linked with Musk's tweet.

In 2021, the multiplayer video game Fortnite released a "Diamond Hanz" skin, based on the design of Meme Man, as a joke for April Fools Day.

== See also ==
- Rage comic – A meme which uses copies of black-and-white Microsoft Paint illustrations to illustrate emotional states
- Vaporwave – A microgenre of electronic music, and visual art style characterized by a nostalgic or surrealist engagement with the popular entertainment, technology and advertising of previous decades
- List of Internet phenomena – List which covers many popular internet memes
