= Koss Corporation =

American company specializing in audio equipment

- Type: Public
- Traded as: Nasdaq: KOSS
- ISIN: US5006921085
- Industry: Electronics
- Founded: 1953; 73 years ago
- Founder: John Charles Koss
- Headquarters: Milwaukee, Wisconsin, United States
- Area served: Worldwide
- Key people: Michael J. Koss (CEO)
- Revenue: 12,62 million US$ (2025)
- Number of employees: 28 (2023)
- Website: koss.com

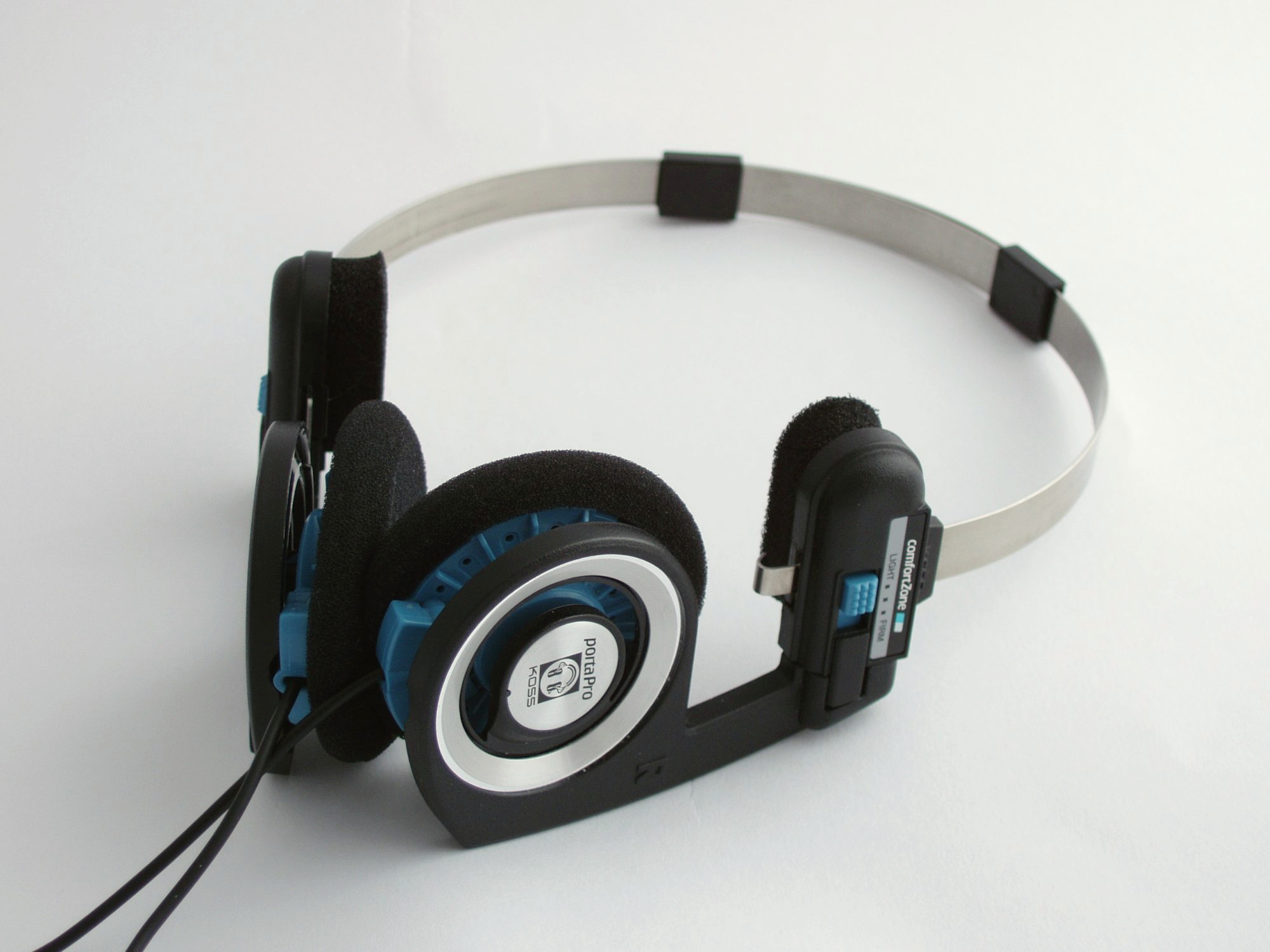
Koss Porta Pro headphones

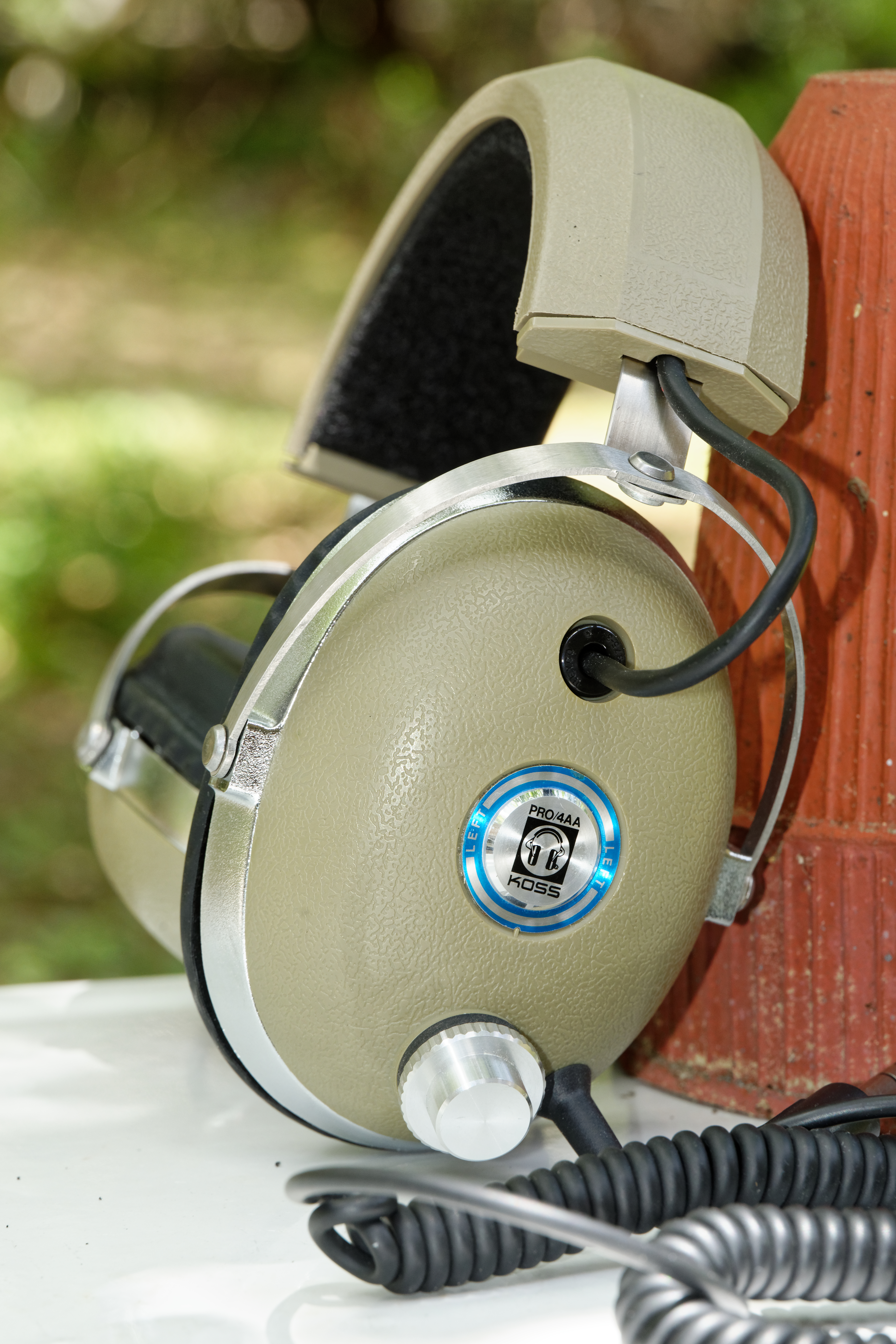
Koss Pro/4AA headphones

Koss Corporation is a company in Milwaukee, Wisconsin, US that manufactures headphones. The company created the first high-fidelity stereo headphones in 1958.

== History ==
John C. Koss founded the J.C. Koss Hospital Television Rental Company in 1953. After a short time Koss was looking for new ideas, and partnered with Martin Lange to eventually develop a stereo headphone. Based in Milwaukee, Wisconsin, United States, in 1991 Koss Audio & Video Electronics started producing and selling consumer electronics products as a separate company in Hazelwood, Missouri, United States. The Koss family owns more than 75% of the firm.

Having only a high school education, John C. Koss worked with Lange, an engineer, to develop the headphone that launched the company almost by accident, as they came upon the headphone idea as a result of an attempt to market a portable phonograph. What made this product unique was the privacy switch feature, which gave listeners the opportunity to listen to the first Koss SP/3 Stereophones. Initially, the product's purpose was to demonstrate to consumers the high-fidelity stereo sound of the portable phonograph.

Until then headphones had only been used in communications applications. In 1958 the design was introduced at a hi-fi trade show in Milwaukee, and audiences approved of it. Soon after the trade show, Koss went into business manufacturing and marketing stereophones from his basement apartment. The technology was imitated by competing manufacturers.

In the early 1970s, Koss worked out of two locations near each other. One was Koss TV-Rental, which also did electronics and musical instrument repairs; the second was the main facility two blocks to the east. At this time, Koss pioneered the high-end "electro-static" "ES series" headphone market. These headphones set the standard for wide-range frequency response. Being very durable, they required service for wear and tear on cords and earpads during their lifespan, by K&M Electronics (Klenworth & Midwest based in Minneapolis), working out of the TV Rental location. Koss headphones were easy and cost-effective to repair. At this site, a separate garage was set up to support the musical instrument and electronics repair business. The TV rental and repair site was managed by John's brother Pete Koss. Eventually, Koss dominated the headphone market, competing mainly with Telex. Koss was considered a higher quality unit at the time, offering a wide line of models.

In the late 1970s, to accommodate rapid growth, Koss moved to its present location on the north side of Milwaukee.

in the 1980s, Koss tried to diversify, unsuccessfully, into related areas of electronics; in 1984 the company filed for bankruptcy protection after a net loss that year of US$6 million (equivalent to $18.59 million in 2025). Koss emerged from Chapter 11 bankruptcy proceedings in 1985.

In 1991, Michael J. Koss, son of founder John C. Koss, took over as president and chief executive officer.

In December 2009, former vice president of finance Sujata "Sue" Sachdeva was charged in federal court with wire fraud after the firm discovered her embezzlement of US$34 million (equivalent to $51.02 million in 2025), and sentenced to eleven years in federal prison, of which she served six years. Koss was forced to restate five years of financials. It was able to recoup over US$12 million from its former auditor, from Sachdeva's credit card company, and by auctioning Sachdeva's stolen merchandise.

In 2020, Koss sued Apple, Bose, JLAB Audio, Plantronics Inc., and Skullcandy for patent infringement. In July 2022 Koss and Apple reached a settlement for an undisclosed amount regarding the alleged patent infringement on Koss' intellectual property.

During the 2021 GameStop short squeeze, the executives and directors of Koss earned US$40 million by selling company stock. This was more than the value of the Koss Corporation at the end of 2020.

== Products ==
Product	Description	Year released
SP/3	The World's First Stereophone	1958
Pro4 Stereophones	Elected #1 by Consumer Union Magazine in 1963	1962
Beatlephone	Beatles Tribute Stereophone	1966
ESP/6	The first self-energizing electrostatic stereophone	1968
Pro4AA	Featured a speaker system specially designed for dynamic stereophones	1970
HV1A	The first dynamic stereophone to deliver all 10 audible octaves	1974
Porta Pro	Portable "high-end supra-aural stereophone model"	1984
JCK/300 Kordless Stereophone System	Cordless stereophone system with infrared technology	1989
ESP/950	Electrostatic, complemented by the E/90 amp	1990
QZ1000	Quiet zone noise reduction stereophone	1993
KSC35	Earclip stereophone	1995
The Plug	Plug in-ear earphone	1999
Sporta Pro	Tilting headband reduces hair/hat interference, based on Porta Pro	1999
QZ/5	Provides isolation from all types of outside noise, high and mid frequency	2000
UR/20	Incorporated a neodymium, rare earth magnet and 16-micron mylar diaphragm for deep bass and treble clarity	2000
KTXPro1	Rubber headband	2002
UR40	Foldable headphones	2002
KSC75	Earclip headphones	2004
CC_01	Earphones with adjustable, in-ear fit.	2009
KDE250	Adjustable earclip headphones	2009
FitClips	Earclip activewear headphones designed for women	2010
Striva	World's first Wi-Fi headphones	2012
BT540i	Wireless headphones with Bluetooth aptX codec	2014
SP Series: SP540 and SP330	Designed specifically for personal listening	2014
Pro4S	Professional studio headphones	2014
UR23i	Headphones with D-Profile design, In-line one-touch microphone, and tangle-resistant flat cable	2015
KPH14	Side-firing headphones for active lifestyles	2015
KEB25i	Headphones with a dynamic element positioned just outside the ear, connected to a tubular port structure that inserts into an expandable cushion	2015
BT539i	Headphones with D-Profile design, Bluetooth	2017
KPH30i	Pro35/KTXPro1 inspired	2017
PortaPro Wireless	In-line mic, onboard controls, wireless	2018
Noise Canceling QZ Buds	Monitor mode switch deactivates noise cancelling	2018
CS300 USB	Flexible mic, electret mic	2018
Utility Series	KPH40, KEB90, and PortPro with detachable cables	2021
PortaPro Wireless 2.0	Built-in mic, onboard controls, wireless, utilizes dual steel headband to carry audio signals	2024
KPH30 Wireless	Built-in mic, onboard controls, wireless, modified design for durability	2025

Koss headphones were also sold in RadioShack stores under their own brand. The Koss Plug and Koss Spark Plug are in-ear passive noise-isolating earphones; they can be adapted to take the high-end Etymotics ear tip, becoming the "Koss Hybrid". Other models include the Koss Porta Pro and well-regarded budget-priced headphones including the KSC series. Since 1989, all headphones manufactured in North America by KOSS come with a limited lifetime warranty covering normal use by the initial owner. Returning to the pre-Koss use of headphones, Koss produces communications headsets with microphone.
