= GameStop =

American video game retailer

GameStop Corp.
- Logo used since 2021
- Formerly: Babbage's (1984–1999)
- Type: Public company
- Traded as: NYSE: GME (Class A); S&P 400 component
- Industry: Retail
- Predecessors: Software Etc.; Funco
- Founded: 1984 (as Babbage’s); 1999 (as GameStop)
- Founders: Leonard Riggio; Daniel DeMatteo; Richard Fontaine
- Headquarters: Grapevine, Texas, U.S.
- Number of locations: 2,206 (January 2026)
- Area served: Australia; France; United States
- Key people: Ryan Cohen (chairman and CEO)
- Products: Video games; Consoles; Accessories
- Revenue: ▼US$3.63 billion (2025)
- Operating income: ▲US$232.1 million (2025)
- Net income: ▲US$418.4 million (2025)
- Total assets: ▲US$10.39 billion (2025)
- Total equity: ▼US$5.44 billion (2025)
- Number of employees: 4,000 full-time; 11,000–16,000 part-time (Jan 2026)
- Parent: NeoStar Retail Group (1994–1996); Babbage's Etc. (1996–1999); Barnes & Noble (1999–2004)
- Subsidiaries: EB Games; Micromania-Zing
- Website: gamestop.com

GameStop Corp. is an American video game, consumer electronics, and gaming merchandise retailer, headquartered in Grapevine, Texas (a suburb of Dallas–Fort Worth). The brand is the largest video game retailer worldwide. As of January 2026, the company operated 2,206 stores including 1,598 in the United States, 300 in Australia and 308 in Europe under the GameStop, EB Games, Micromania-Zing, ThinkGeek and Zing Pop Culture brands. The company was founded in Dallas in 1984 as Babbage's, and took on its current name in 1999.

The company's performance declined during the mid-to-late 2010s due to the shift of video game sales to online shopping and failed investments by GameStop in smartphone retail. In 2021, after retail investors on Reddit noticed that the short interest exceeded 100%, the company's stock price skyrocketed from $17.25 to over US$500 per share. According to the SEC report, this volatility was only in part due to the massive buying power of retail investors. The company received significant media attention during January and February 2021 due to the volatility of its stock price in the GameStop short squeeze; the company was ranked 577th on the Fortune 500. GameStop also used to own and publish the video game magazine Game Informer before discontinuing it in August 2024 and selling it to Gunzilla Games in 2025.

Over 400 GameStop stores closed in January 2025 due to a decline in sales, at pace to close twice as many as the company did in 2024. Consumer shift to the online marketplace has led to a decline in revenue. This represents the highest number of stores that GameStop has closed in a single month.

On March 25, 2025, GameStop announced a plan to use its cash reserves to buy Bitcoin.

== History ==
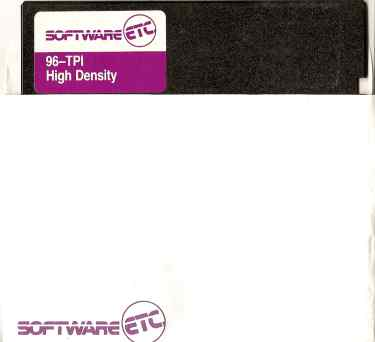
Logo of retailer Software, Etc. on a 5.25" floppy disk branded by the company

=== Origins, founding, and early expansion (1984–1999) ===
GameStop traces its roots to Babbage's, a Dallas, Texas–based software retailer founded in 1984 by former Harvard Business School classmates James McCurry and Gary M. Kusin. The company was named after Charles Babbage and opened its first store in Dallas's NorthPark Center with the help of Ross Perot, an early investor in the company. The company quickly began to focus on video game sales for the then-dominant Atari 2600. Babbage's began selling Nintendo games in 1987. Babbage's became a public company via an initial public offering in 1988. By 1991, video games accounted for two-thirds of Babbage's sales.

Babbage's merged with Software Etc., an Edina, Minnesota–based retailer that specialized in personal computing software, to create NeoStar Retail Group in 1994. The merger was structured as a stock swap, where shareholders of Babbage's and Software Etc. received shares of NeoStar, a newly formed holding company. Babbage's and Software Etc. continued to operate as independent subsidiaries of NeoStar and retained their respective senior management teams. Babbage's founder and chairman James McCurry became chairman of NeoStar, while Babbage's president Gary Kusin and Software Etc. President Daniel DeMatteo retained their respective titles. Software Etc. chairman Leonard Riggio became chairman of NeoStar's executive committee.

Gary Kusin resigned as president of Babbage's in February 1995 to start a cosmetics company. Daniel DeMatteo, formerly president of Software Etc., assumed Kusin's duties and was promoted to president and chief operating officer of NeoStar. NeoStar chairman James McCurry was also appointed to the newly created position of NeoStar CEO. The company relocated from its headquarters in Dallas to Grapevine later that year.

NeoStar merged its Babbage's and Software Etc. units into a single organization in May 1996 amid declining sales. Company president Daniel DeMatteo also resigned, and NeoStar chairman and CEO James McCurry assumed the title of president. In September of that year, after NeoStar was unable to secure the credit necessary to purchase inventory for the holiday season, the company filed for Chapter 11 bankruptcy and appointed Thomas G. Plaskett chairman while James McCurry remained company chief executive and president.

The leadership changes were not enough; in November 1996, the assets of NeoStar were purchased for $58.5 million by Leonard Riggio, a founder of Software Etc. and chairman and principal stockholder of Barnes & Noble. Electronics Boutique had also bid to purchase NeoStar, but the judge presiding over NeoStar's bankruptcy accepted Riggio's bid because it kept open 108 stores more than Electronics Boutique's bid would have. Approximately 200 retail stores were not included in the transaction and were subsequently closed.

Following his purchase of NeoStar's assets, Leonard Riggio dissolved the holding company and created a new holding company named Babbage's Etc. He appointed Richard "Dick" Fontaine, previously Software Etc.'s chief executive during its expansion in the late 1980s and early 1990s, as Babbage Etc.'s chief executive. Daniel DeMatteo, previously the president of both Software Etc. and NeoStar, became company president and COO. Three years later, in 1999, Babbage's Etc. launched its GameStop brand with 30 stores in strip malls. The company also launched gamestop.com, a website that allowed consumers to purchase video games online. GameStop.com was promoted in Babbage's and Software Etc. stores.

=== Growth and acquisitions (1999–2016) ===
In October 1999, Barnes & Noble purchased Babbage's Etc. for $215 million. Because Babbage's Etc. was principally owned by Leonard Riggio, who was also Barnes & Noble's chairman and principal shareholder, a special committee of independent directors of Barnes & Noble Booksellers evaluated and signed off on the deal. A few months later, in May 2000, Barnes & Noble acquired Funco, the owner of Eden Prairie, Minnesota–based video game retailer FuncoLand, for $160 million. Babbage's Etc., which had been previously operating as a direct subsidiary of Barnes & Noble, became a wholly owned subsidiary of Funco. With its acquisition of Funco, Barnes & Noble also acquired Game Informer, a video game magazine that was first published in 1991. Funco was renamed GameStop, Inc. in December 2000 in anticipation of an initial public offering.

In February 2002, the company became public again via an initial public offering. Barnes & Noble retained control over the newly public company with 67% of outstanding shares and 95% of voting shares. Barnes & Noble retained control over GameStop until October 2004, when it distributed its 59% stake in GameStop to stakeholders of Barnes & Noble, making it an independent company.

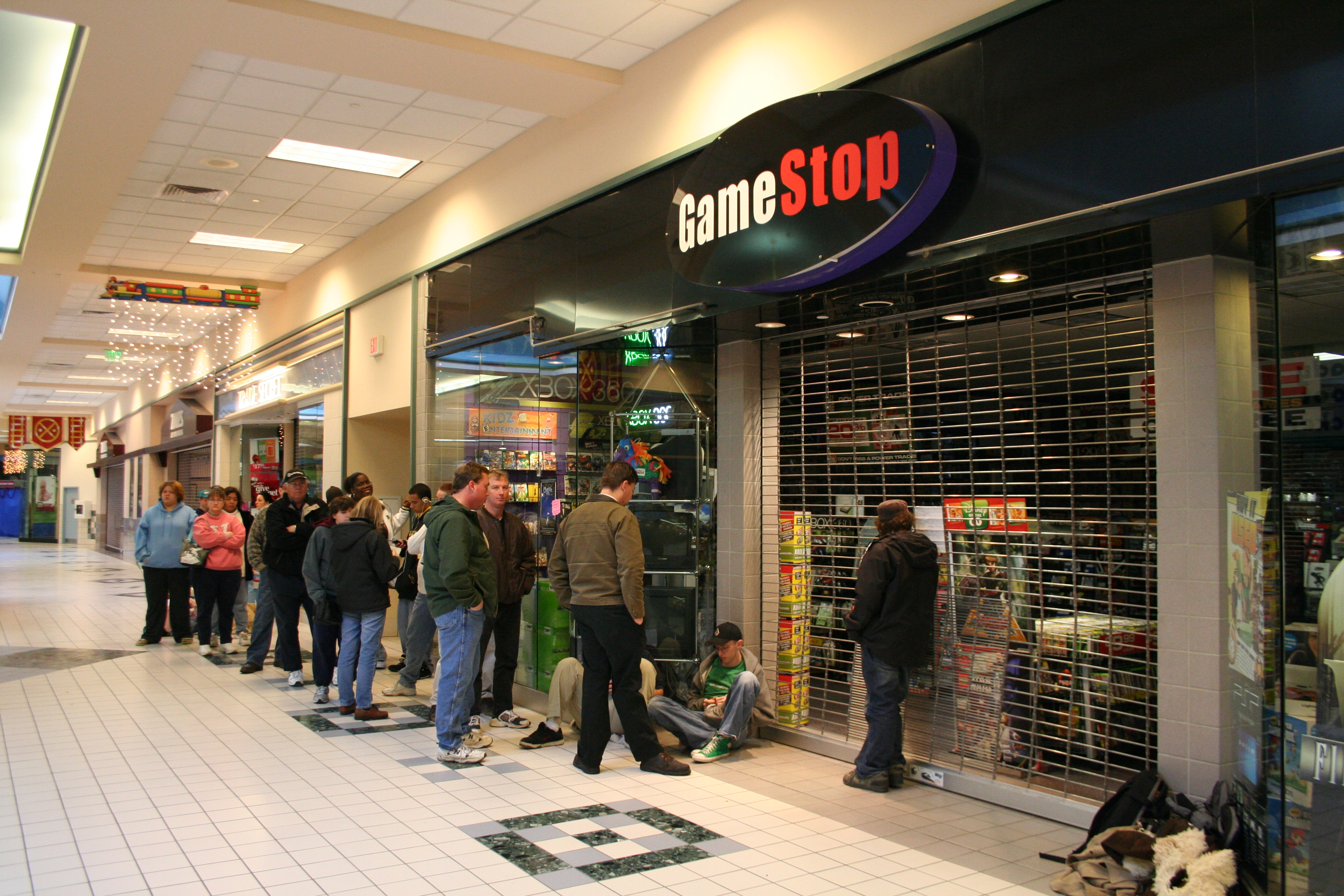
Customers lined up outside of a GameStop store in 2006 for the launch of the Wii

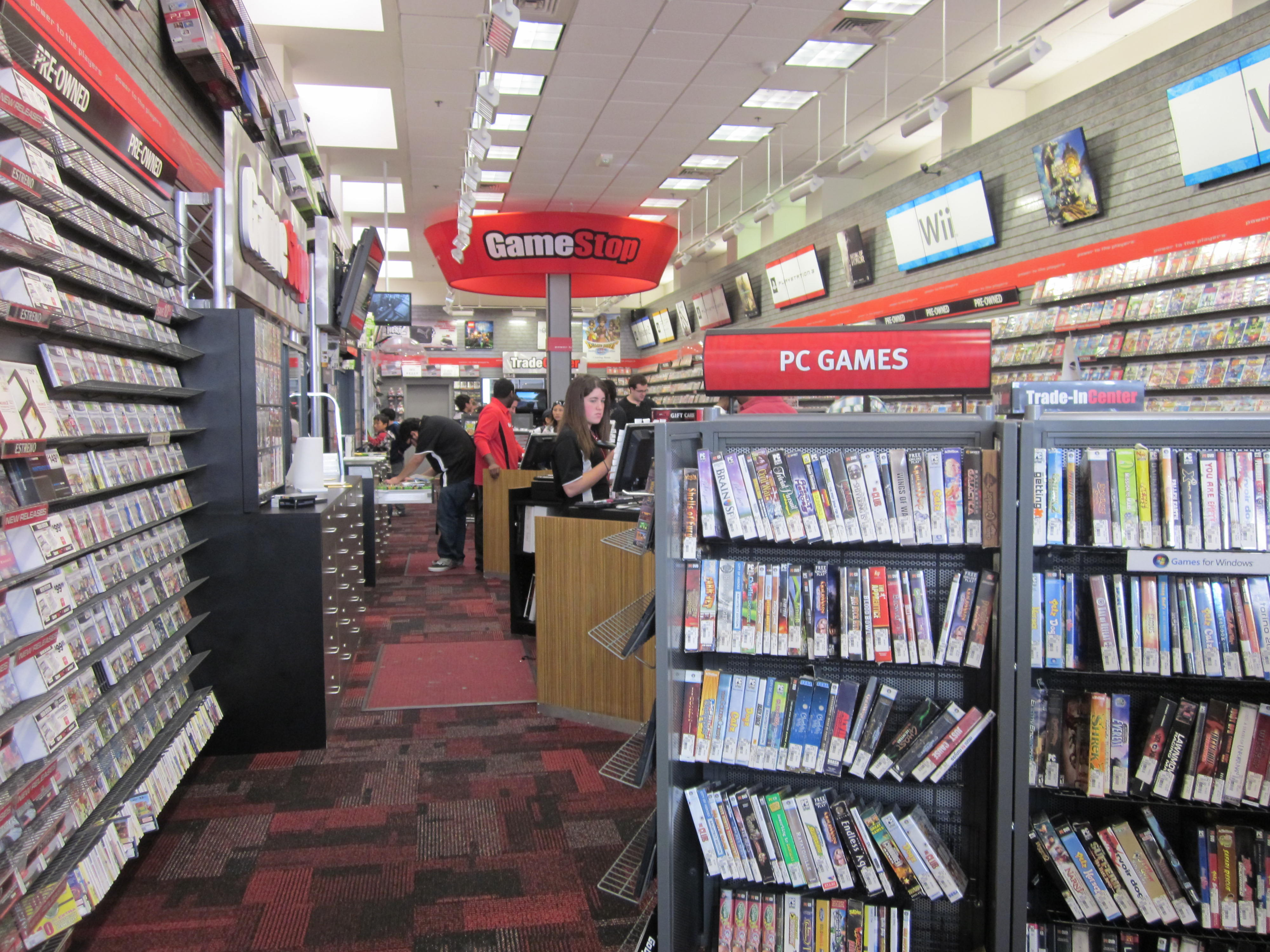
Interior of a GameStop store in San Francisco in 2010

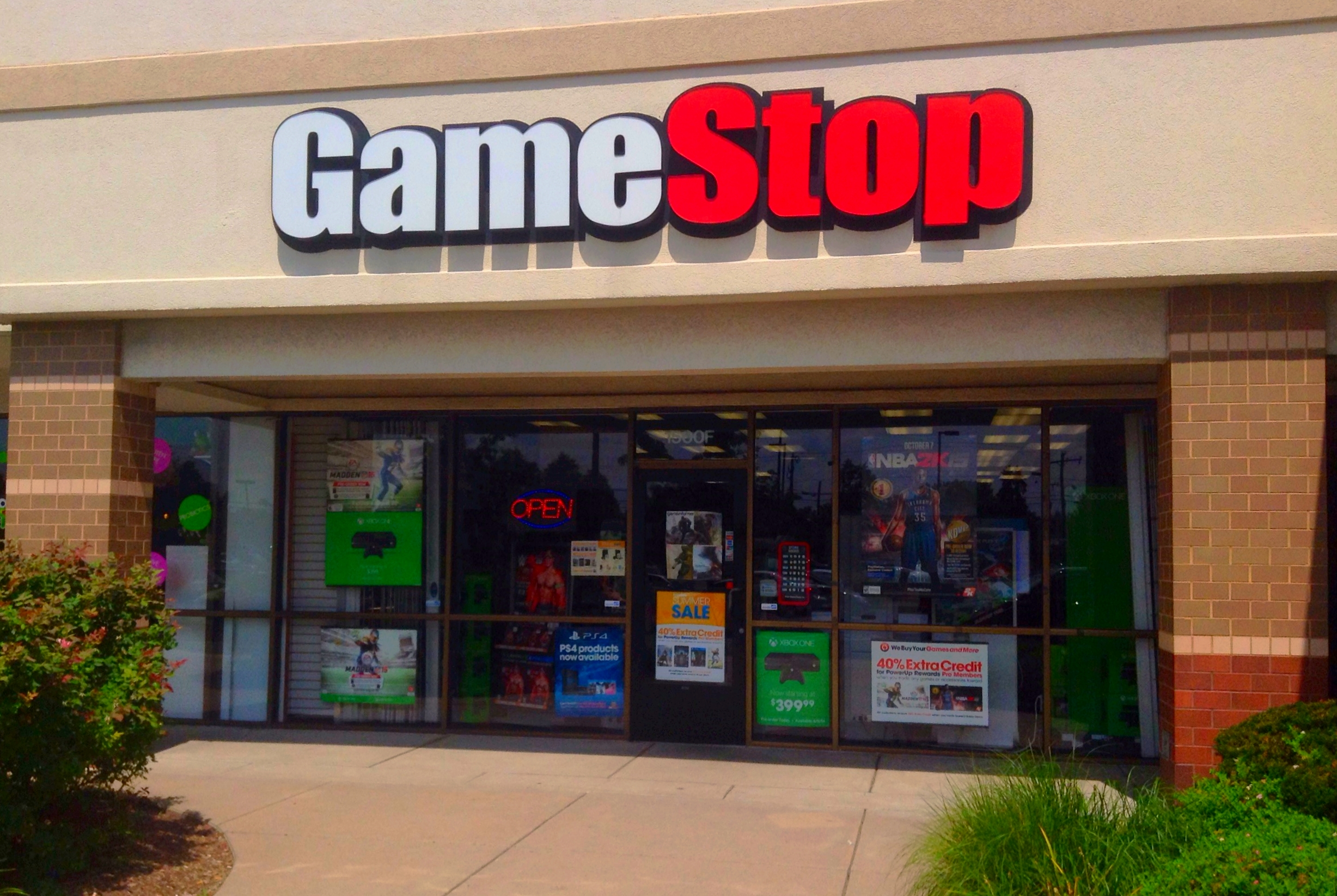
A store in Manchester, Connecticut in 2014

==== Other acquisitions ====
- In 2005, GameStop acquired EB Games (formerly Electronics Boutique) for $1.44 billion. This expanded GameStop's operations into Australia, Canada, Europe and New Zealand. GameStop's operations expanded to over 4,250 stores worldwide as a result of the acquisition.
- In 2007, GameStop acquired Rhino Video Games, who operated 70 video game stores throughout the Southeastern United States, from Blockbuster for an undisclosed amount.
- In April 2008, GameStop acquired Free Record Shop's 49 Norwegian stores.
- In October 2008, GameStop acquired Micromania, a French video-game retailer, for $700 million. GameStop, which had previously owned no stores in France, now had 332 French video-game stores.
- In November 2009, it acquired a majority stake in Jolt Online Gaming, an Irish browser game studio. Jolt closed in 2012.
- In 2010, GameStop acquired Kongregate, a San Francisco–based website for browser-based games. In 2017, it was sold for $55 million.
- In 2011, GameStop acquired Spawn Labs and Impulse in separate transactions. Spawn Labs was a developer of technology that allowed users to play video games that were run remotely on machines in data centers rather than their personal computer or console. Impulse was a digital distribution and multiplayer video game platform acquired from Stardock, and renamed GameStop PC Downloads. Under the ownership of GameStop, the service was redesigned and sold games that use other platforms such as Steam while also selling games that use its own proprietary DRM solution, Impulse:Reactor. GameStop shut down both PC Downloads and Spawn Labs in 2014.
- In 2012, GameStop acquired BuyMyTronics, a Denver-based online market place for consumer electronics.
- In October 2012, GameStop acquired a 49.9% ownership interest in Simply Mac, a Salt Lake City–based Apple authorized reseller and repairer founded in 2006. GameStop acquired the remaining 50.1% of ownership in November 2013. GameStop tried to target areas for potential new Simply Mac locations in smaller markets that did not have an existing Apple Store within a reasonable driving distance. In January 2017, GameStop closed many Simply Mac locations. The chain had as many as 70 locations at the time of the announcement. In 2019, GameStop divested Simply Mac; at that time it had 43 stores.
- In November 2013, GameStop acquired Spring Mobile, a Salt Lake City–based retailer of AT&T-branded wireless services.
- It acquired 163 RadioShack locations in February 2015.
- In July 2015, GameStop acquired Geeknet.
- On August 3, 2016, GameStop acquired 507 AT&T store chains in plans to diversify into new businesses and less dependent on the video game market.

==== Brand expansion ====
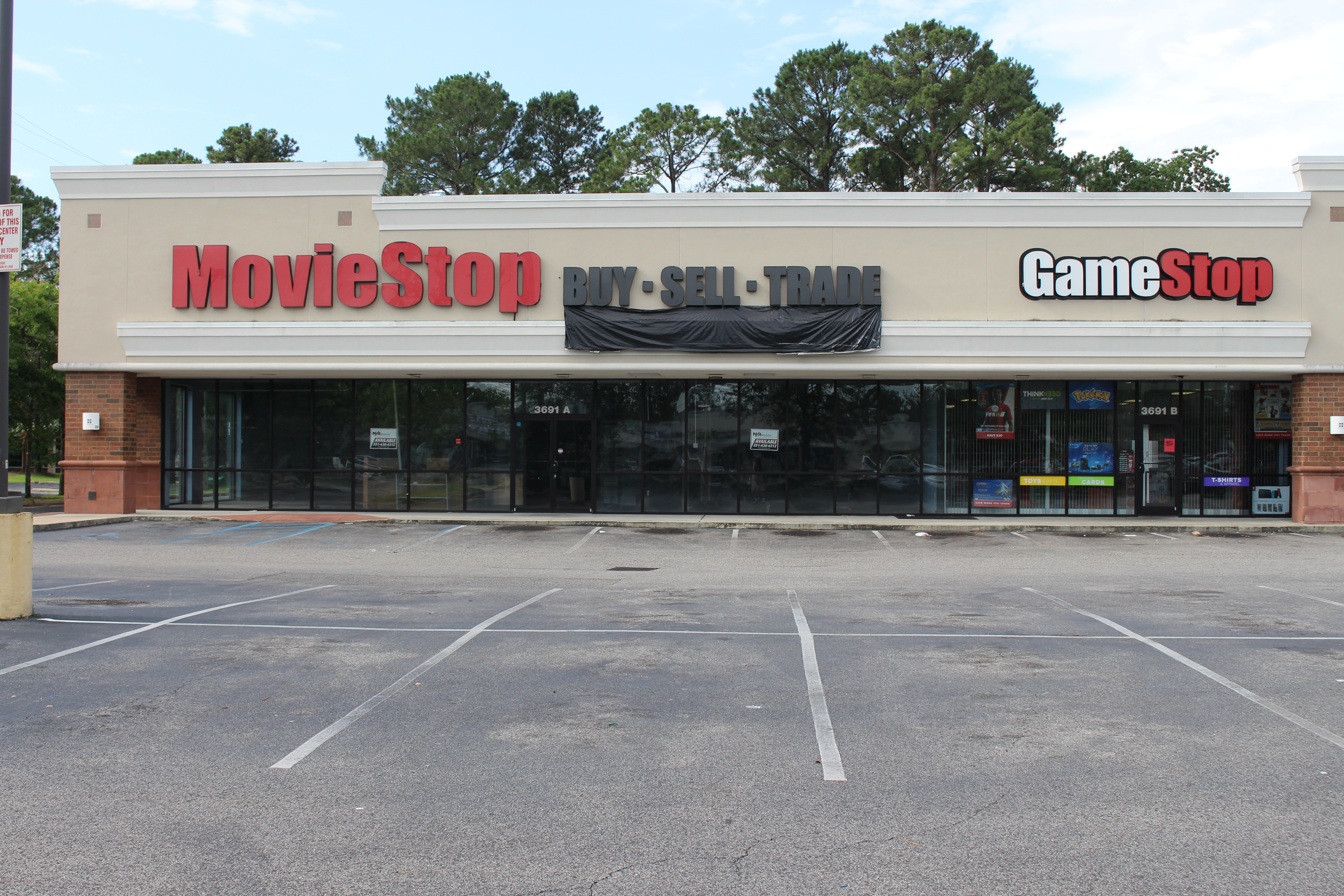
A shuttered MovieStop store and a GameStop store in Mobile, Alabama in 2018

GameStop founded MovieStop in 2004 as a standalone store that focused on new and used movies. More than 42 locations were opened, which typically adjoined or were adjacent to GameStop locations. GameStop spun off MovieStop to private owners in 2012. In November 2014, Draw Another Circle LLC, a company controlled by merchandising executive Joel Weinshanker that also owns Hastings Entertainment, purchased MovieStop. The chain shuttered in 2016.

In October 2012 at Grapevine Mills in Dallas, GameStop introduced GameStop Kids, a pop-up retail concept. The brand, which had 80 locations in shopping malls during the Christmas and holiday season, focused on children's products, and carried only games rated "Everyone" by the ESRB, along with merchandise of popular franchises aimed towards the demographic.

In July 2014, GameStop's Australian Division EB Games Australia introduced ZiNG Pop Culture—a pop culture retailer. ZiNG Pop Culture has since expanded to over 50 standalone stores as well as numerous large format hybrid stores, which include both an EB Games and Zing Pop Culture store in a single location with an expanded selection of games merchandise.

==== European expansion and stagnation ====
GameStop's entry into the European market began in 2003 with the acquisition of Irish video game retailer Gamesworld. Gamesworld, which had eleven stores in Ireland, then announced that it planned to add 33 stores across the island of Ireland. GameStop's merger with EB Games in October 2005 expanded GameStop's European footprint with the addition of nearly 400 stores across Denmark, Finland, Germany, Italy, Norway, Spain, Sweden and Switzerland. The merger did not include EB Game's British and Irish stores which continued separately under the GAME brand. GameStop continued its expansion, operating 636 stores across Europe by 2007, now including Portugal. In April 2008 with the acquisition of Free Record Shop's 49 Norwegian stores. This was followed in October with the acquisition of French video-game retailer Micromania and its 332 stores for $700m, which increased its European store count to 1,077. However, GameStop's attempts to expand into the UK were less successful. In 2007, its bid to acquire GameStation and its 217 stores from struggling Blockbuster were thwarted by GAME who acquired it instead in May. In November, when British retailer Woolworths went into insolvency administration, British gaming magazine MCV reported that GameStop was bidding for half of Woolsworth's 815 stores. GameStop later issued a press statement completely denying the reports. Now operating over 1,400 stores across Europe with sales of $1,810 million, 2011 was the limit of GameStop's growth in Europe. GameStop gave up on UK expansion, and in July announced that it would be closing its two solitary stores in Britain and launching an e-commerce website for UK customers. In January 2012, GameStop closed its four remaining stores in Northern Ireland, thus ending its physical presence in the United Kingdom, and transferring its UK business online.

Also in January, GameStop left Portugal closing its 13 stores. Later in March, GameStop's competitor, GAME, entered administration. While GameStop actively explored acquiring GAME's Spanish business and its 291 stores, it was sold instead to investment vehicle, Cherrilux Investments. GameStop's Spanish business was originally an acquisition of Jump Ordenadores SLU by EB Games in 2005 just prior to the merger with GameStop. In September 2014, GameStop announced its withdrawal from Spain and the sale of some of its stores to GAME, the very company it had tried to acquire only two years previously.

==== Management changes ====
Daniel DeMatteo replaced Richard Fontaine as GameStop CEO in August 2008. DeMatteo had served as company COO since 1996. Fontaine, who had been GameStop chairman and CEO since 1996, remained the company's chairman. J. Paul Raines, formerly executive vice president of Home Depot, became company COO in September. J. Paul Raines became GameStop CEO in June 2010. He replaced Daniel DeMatteo who was named executive chairman of the company. Under his leadership, in 2012, GameStop's digital revenue grew from $190 million in 2011 to more than $600 million in 2012.

=== Decline (2016–2024) ===
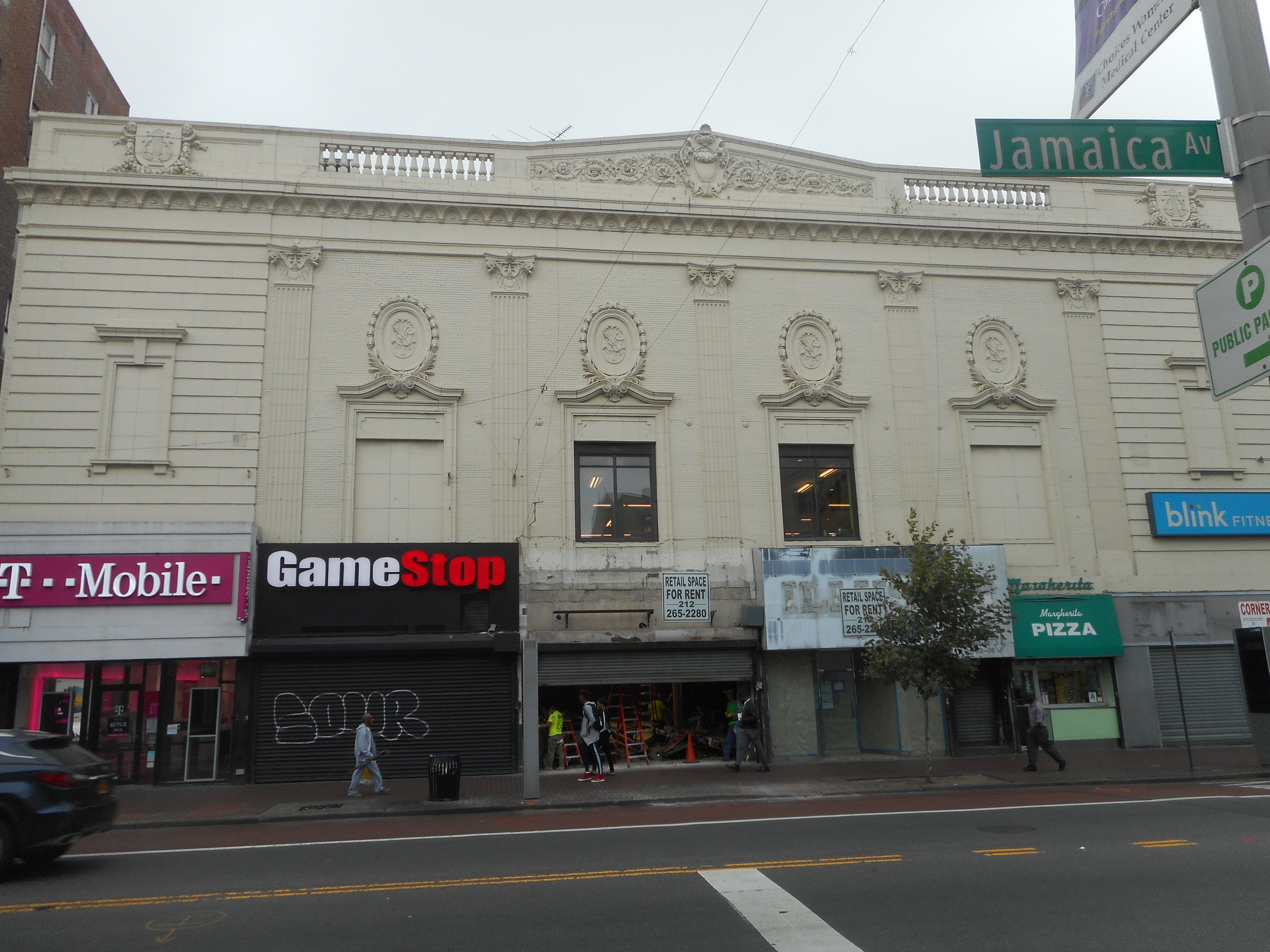
A shuttered and graffitied GameStop store in Jamaica, Queens in 2017

==== Changes in market conditions ====
The market for physical game media has been in a state of decline due to downloadable games on services such as Xbox Live, PlayStation Network, Nintendo eShop, and Steam. This has resulted in a decline in sales at GameStop. In 2017, GameStop reported a 16.4% drop in sales for the 2016 holiday season, but expressed optimism in its non-physical gaming businesses.

In February 2017, it was revealed that GameStop enforced, on all of its retail employees, a program known as Circle of Life. The policy itself was made to ensure that each employee would allow a certain percentage of their sales to pre-orders, rewards cards, used games, or have a customer trade in a game. Upon revelation of the policy, many current and former GameStop employees revealed stories of how the policy has led to them lying to customers. Many more claimed that the policy had led to poor working conditions and emotional distress. Later that month, GameStop reformed the program to solely focus on the store as a whole instead of the previous individual employee basis, though still maintaining a heavy emphasis on the individuals' performance to maintain strong store metrics.

==== Financial losses ====
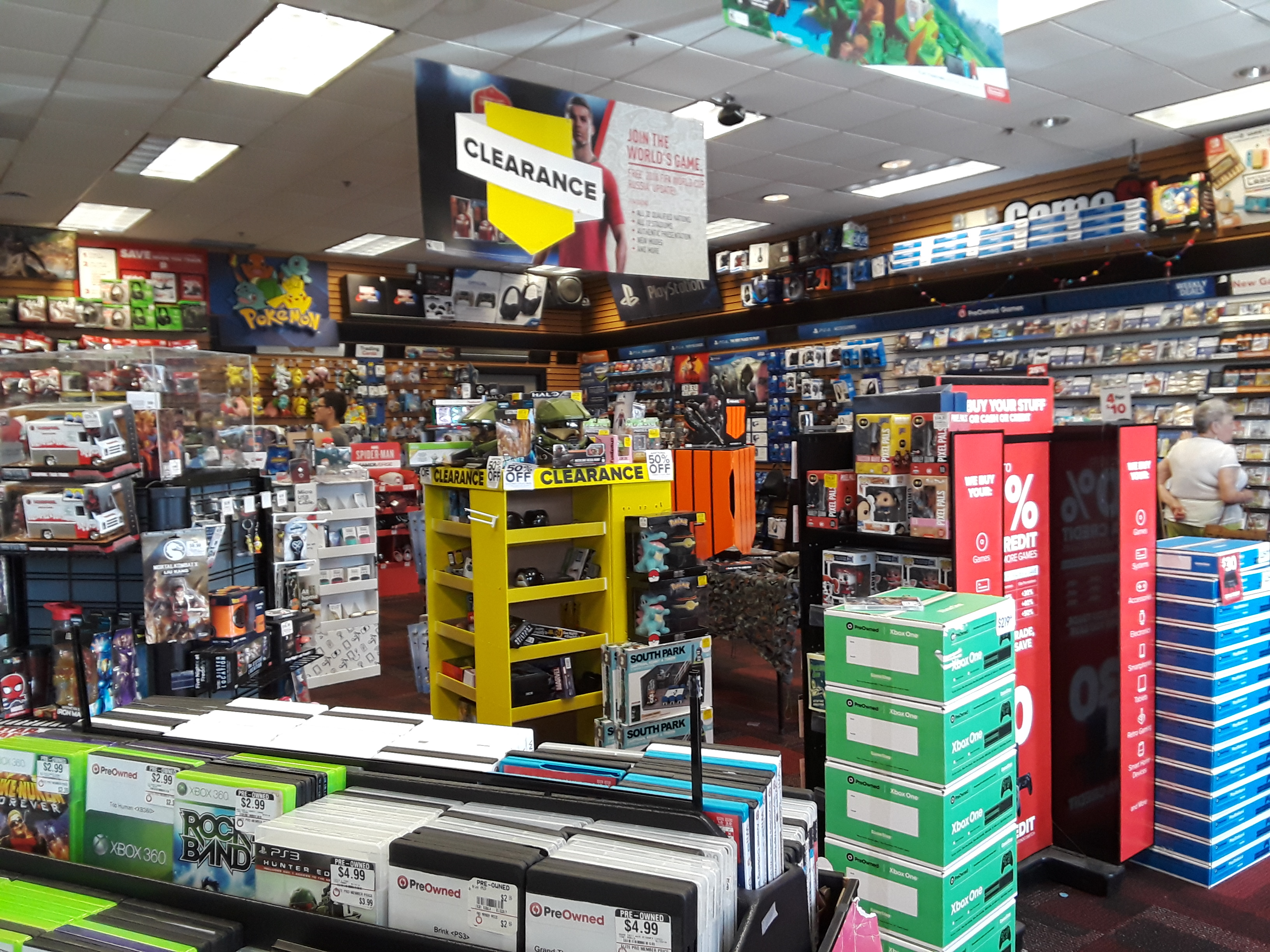
Interior of a GameStop store in Kingstowne, Virginia in 2018, with several items on clearance

Shares of GameStop stock fell 16% in 2016. On February 28, 2017, shares dropped an additional 8% following Microsoft's announcement of its Xbox Game Pass service. Following these reports, GameStop announced it would close over 150 stores in 2017 and expand its non-gaming business. On the same day, however, GameStop said it planned to open 65 new Technology Brand stores and 35 Collectibles stores due to a 44% and 28% increase in sales, respectively. GameStop's total revenue fell 7.6% to $3.06 billion in the quarter ended February 2, 2018.

Business Insider described GameStop's investment in Spring Mobile as a failure, with estimates that the company spent $1.5 billion on acquisitions on Spring Mobile and store locations, but only gained $700 million from the sale of Spring Mobile to Prime Communications in 2018, leaving them $800 million in debt.

In late June 2018, GameStop confirmed talks of a possible sale, with Sycamore Partners, a private equity firm, the most likely buyer, with a target deal expected by February 2019. However, on January 29, 2019, GameStop reported it had stopped looking for a buyer for the company, due to a "lack of available financing on terms that would be commercially acceptable to a prospective acquirer", and was looking for other actions to help re-establish its financial ground. Shares dropped 27% to a 14-year low immediately following this announcement.

The financial results for 2018 showed the biggest loss in GameStop company history. For the 52-week period ending on February 2, 2019, GameStop reported a record-breaking net loss of $673 million. This was a change from the net profit of $34.7 million in the previous year. The net sales for fiscal year 2018 were down 3% year-on-year to $8.29 billion. The company also eliminated its dividend.

In December 2021, GameStop posted a larger-than-expected loss in the fiscal third quarter, and investors are waiting to hear how the ailing company plans to restructure its operations and entice gamers back. In extended trade, shares plummeted.

In March 2024, GameStop announced net income of $6.7 million for fiscal year 2023.

==== Management changes ====
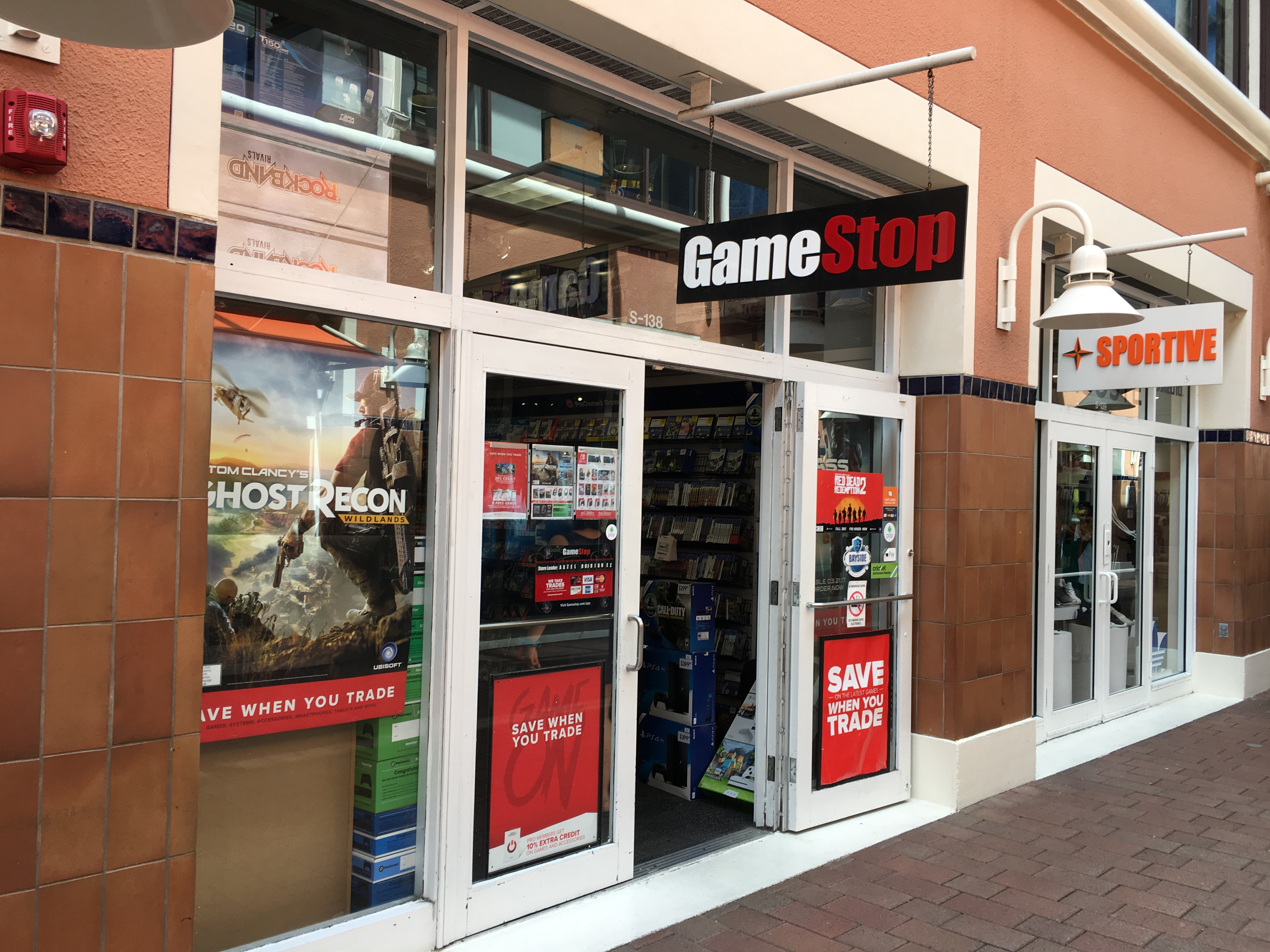
A store at the Bayside Marketplace in Miami in 2017

After being on medical leave since November 2017 due to reoccurrence of a brain tumor, J. Paul Raines resigned from GameStop on January 31, 2018, and died on March 4, 2018. DeMatteo, GameStop's executive chairman stepped in as interim chief executive officer. On February 6, 2018, the company announced Michael K. Mauler as CEO and member of the board of directors. On May 11, 2018, Mauler resigned due to "personal reasons" and chairman Dan DeMatteo was named interim CEO. Mauler did not take any severance package or separation benefits. On May 31, 2018, GameStop named Shane Kim as interim CEO. Kim was replaced by George Sherman in March 2019. On March 12, 2020, it was announced that a group of shareholders including Hestia Capital Partners LP and Permit Capital Enterprise Fund LP sent a "threat" letter to the Grapevine, Texas, company's board, urging it to appoint a stockholder representative as a director.

==== Turnaround efforts ====
===== American division efforts =====
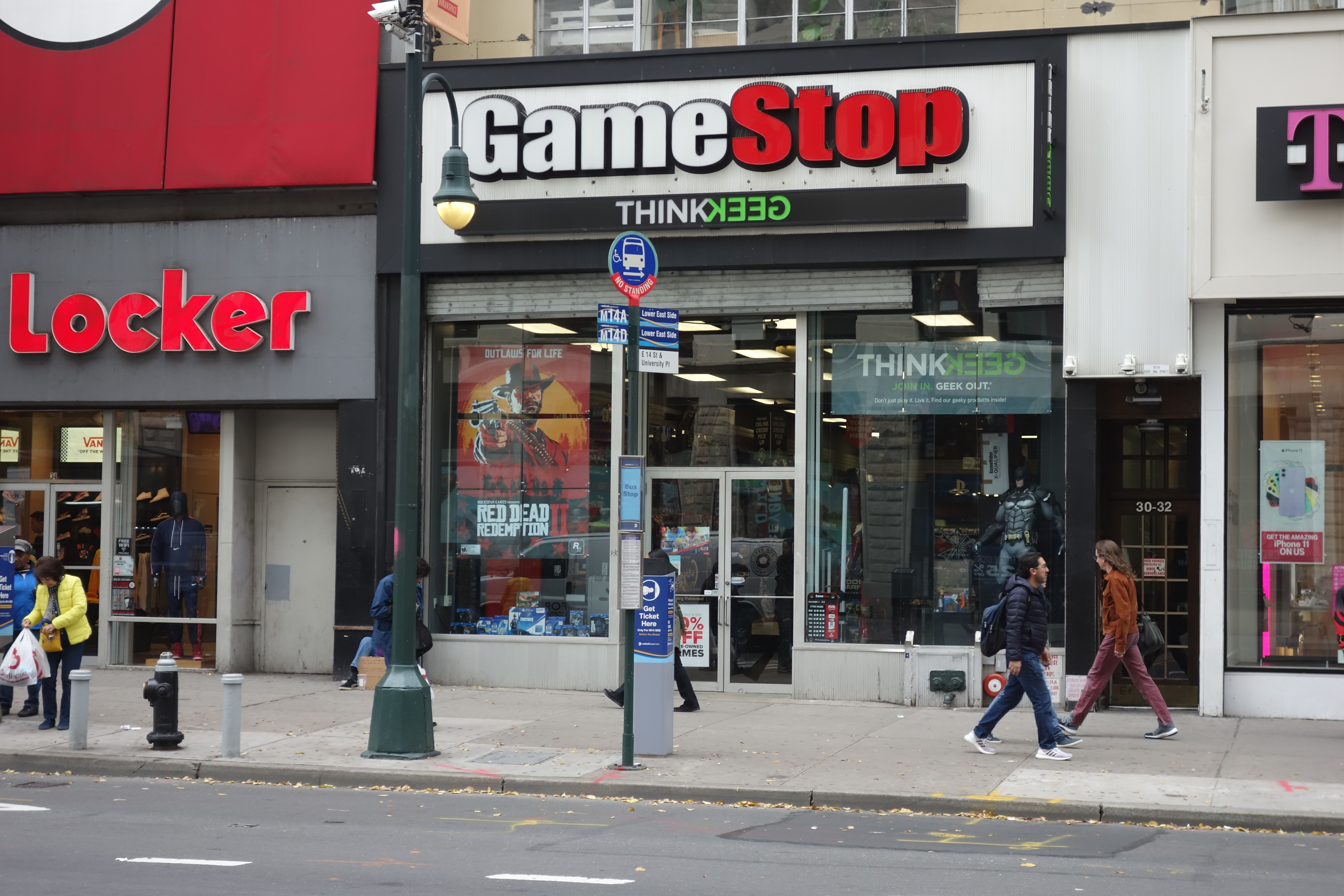
A combined GameStop–ThinkGeek store in New York City in 2019

All GameStop stores in Puerto Rico were shut at the end of March 2016, citing increased rates of government taxes.

In July 2019, GameStop partnered with an outside design firm, R/GA, to put forth plans to revamp stores to focus on competitive gaming and retrogaming, and to introduce new ways for customers to try games before buying them. Each concept store is expected to be mutually exclusive.

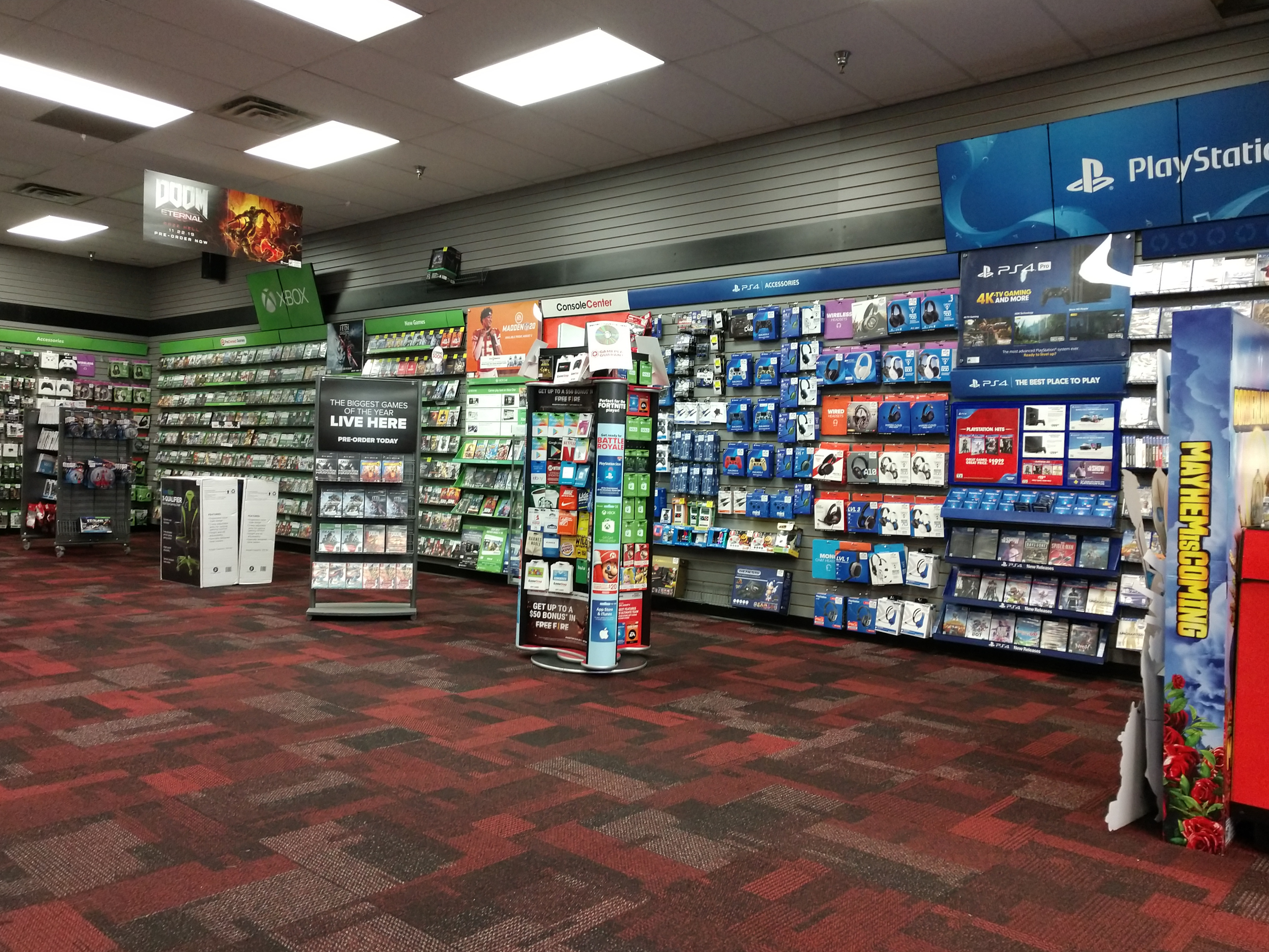
Interior of a store in 2019

A leaked email revealed on July 31, 2019, indicated that 50 employees, including district and regional managers, would be laid off as a result of reorganization efforts. In August 2019, GameStop laid off over 120 people, including about half of the staff of Game Informer, as part of its "GameStop Reboot initiative".

In August 2019, Michael Burry's investment firm Scion Asset Management sent a letter to GameStop executives urging the company to engage in a $238 million stock buyback. The letter also revealed that Scion owned approximately 2,750,000 shares, or about 3.05% of GameStop. The stock price of GameStop, which had been in steady decline in share price since late January 2019, spiked roughly 20% after Burry revealed that he was buying the stock in an interview with Barron's. In the interview, Burry explained that both Sony and Microsoft would enter the next console generation with a physical disc drive and therefore likely extend the longevity of GameStop. He also noted that the company's balance sheet was in good condition. In December 2019, GameStop announced that it spent $178.6 million to buy 34.6 million shares, or 34% of the shares outstanding, at an average price of $5.14 per share. In May 2020, Burry lowered his stake in GameStop.

After reporting that it had missed analysts' expectations during the 2nd quarter of the fiscal year 2019 ending August 2019, as reported in September 2019, GameStop announced that it was planning to close about 180–200 underperforming stores of the 5,700 it had worldwide in the short term, along with developing metrics to evaluate other potential closures over the next two years. In March 2020, four members of GameStop's board of directors – Dan DeMatteo, Gerald Szczepanski, Larry Zilavy, and Steve Koonin – stepped down and were replaced by Reggie Fils-Aimé, Bill Simon and J.K. Symancyk as part of the company's effort to turn around the business.

On October 8, 2020, GameStop announced an agreement with Microsoft to migrate backend systems to Microsoft 365 platforms including Dynamics 365, also including in-store usage of Microsoft Surface products by employees. It was later reported that this agreement would also include revenue sharing on all digital game purchases for Xbox Series X and S for each product sold by the retailer, although the exact percentage of this share was not disclosed.

===== Australian division efforts =====
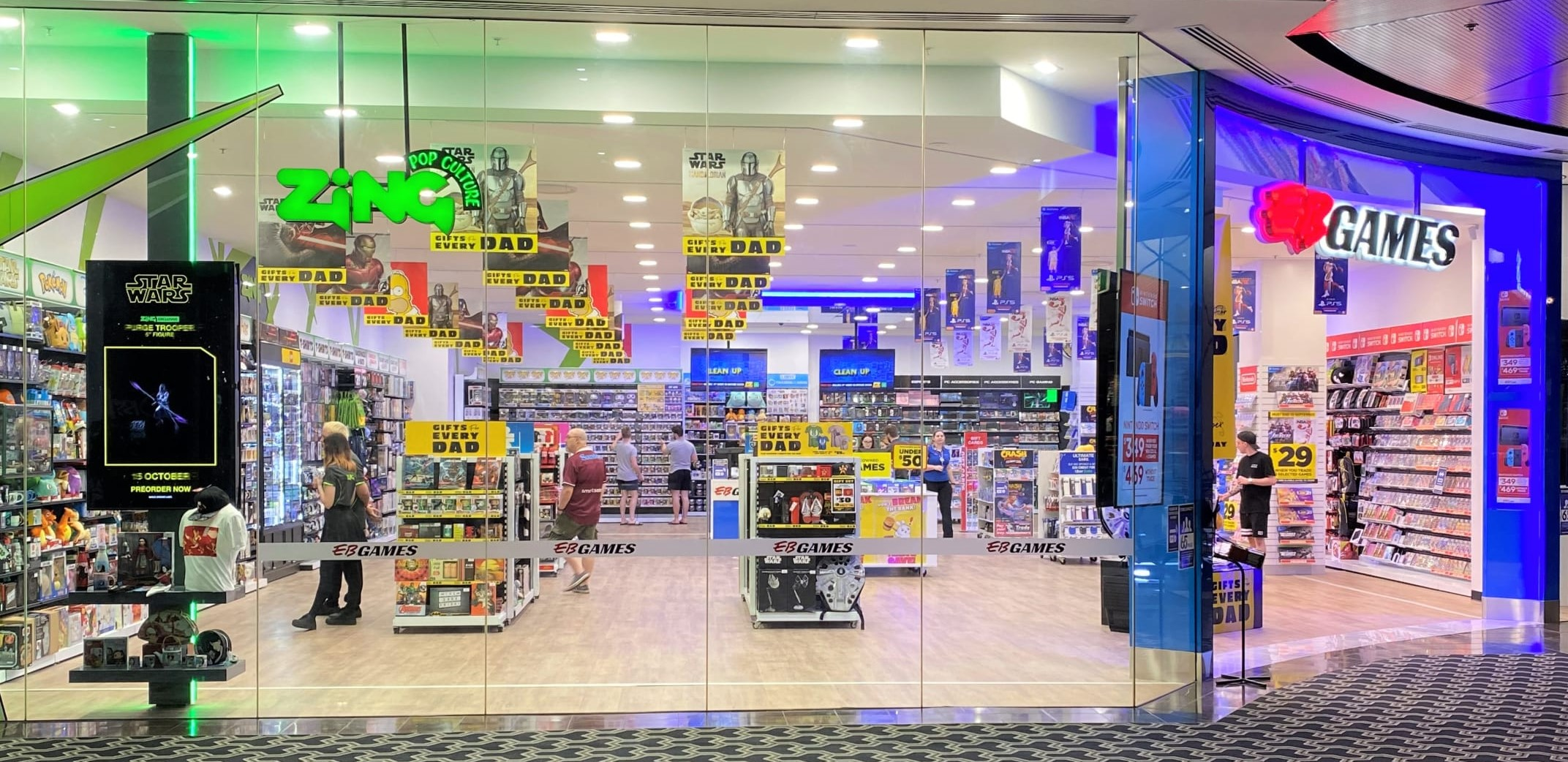
An EB Games and ZiNG Pop Culture 'Hybrid' store from GameStop's Australian division located in Westfield Carindale, Brisbane in 2020

GameStop's Australian division has been focused on increasing higher-margin merchandise and opening more large format hybrid stores which include both an EB Games and Zing Pop Culture store in a single location. These locations have an expanded selection of merchandise based on both games and pop culture. The Sydney Morning Herald reported the diversification into merchandise through the establishment of the Zing Pop Culture brand in 2014 had been vital in keeping the company profitable. The newspaper reported the greater focus on merchandise allowed the company to tap into the lucrative, higher-margin merchandise market of t-shirts, figurines and bobbleheads. The newspaper noted former staff agreed that the Australian divisions' merchandise pivot has been key to the divisions survival in Australia's tough retail landscape. However, they also pointed to the pre-owned games segment as a major part of its success. GameStop's Australian division has been the only profitable segment of the global GameStop business for the 2020, 2021 and 2022 fiscal years. The company reported profits of US$9.4 million, US$52.2 million and US$30.6 million for each fiscal year respectively.

==== COVID-19 pandemic ====
===== American division pandemic response =====
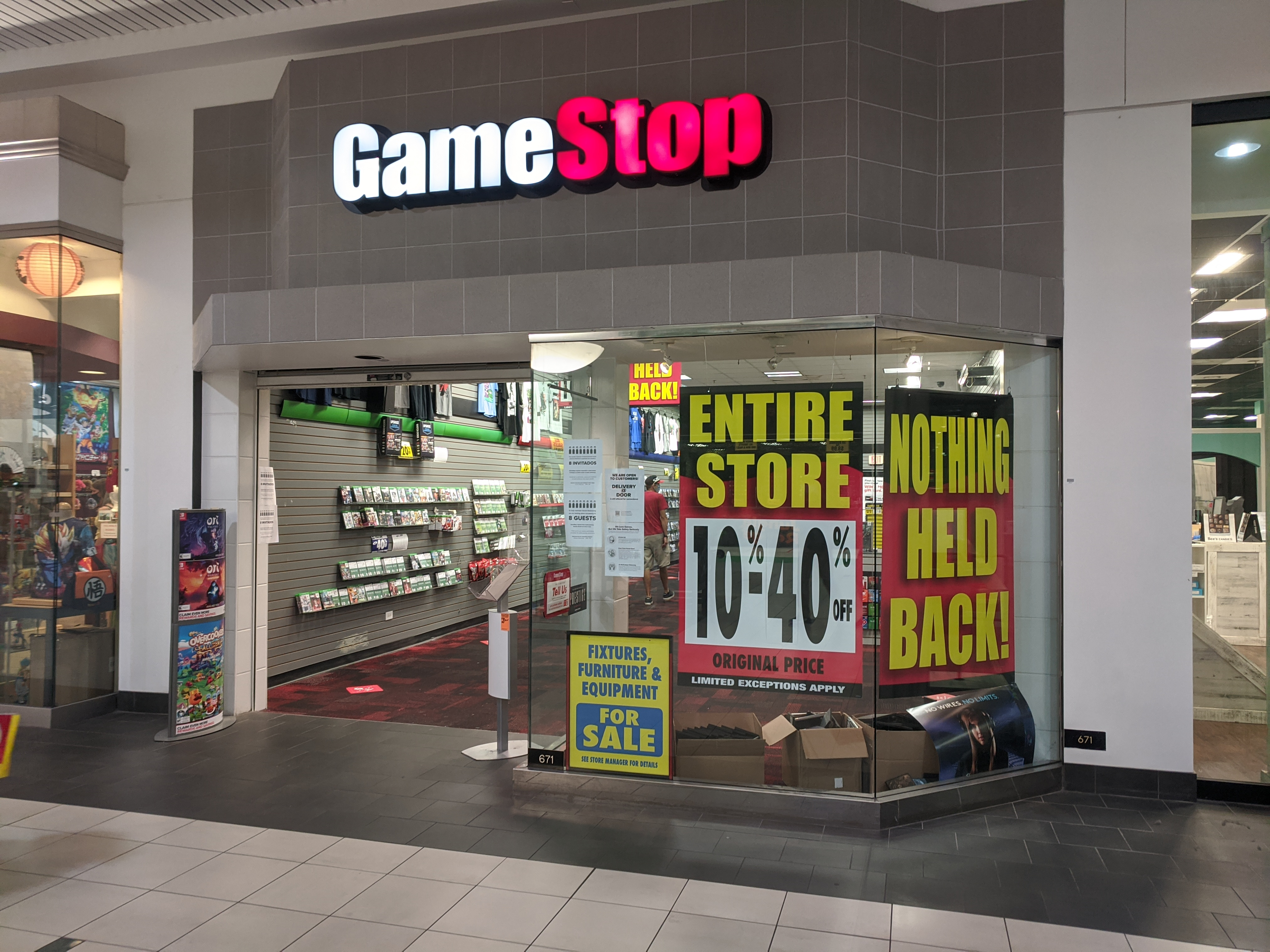
A store in the Melbourne Square mall in Melbourne, Florida being liquidated in December 2020

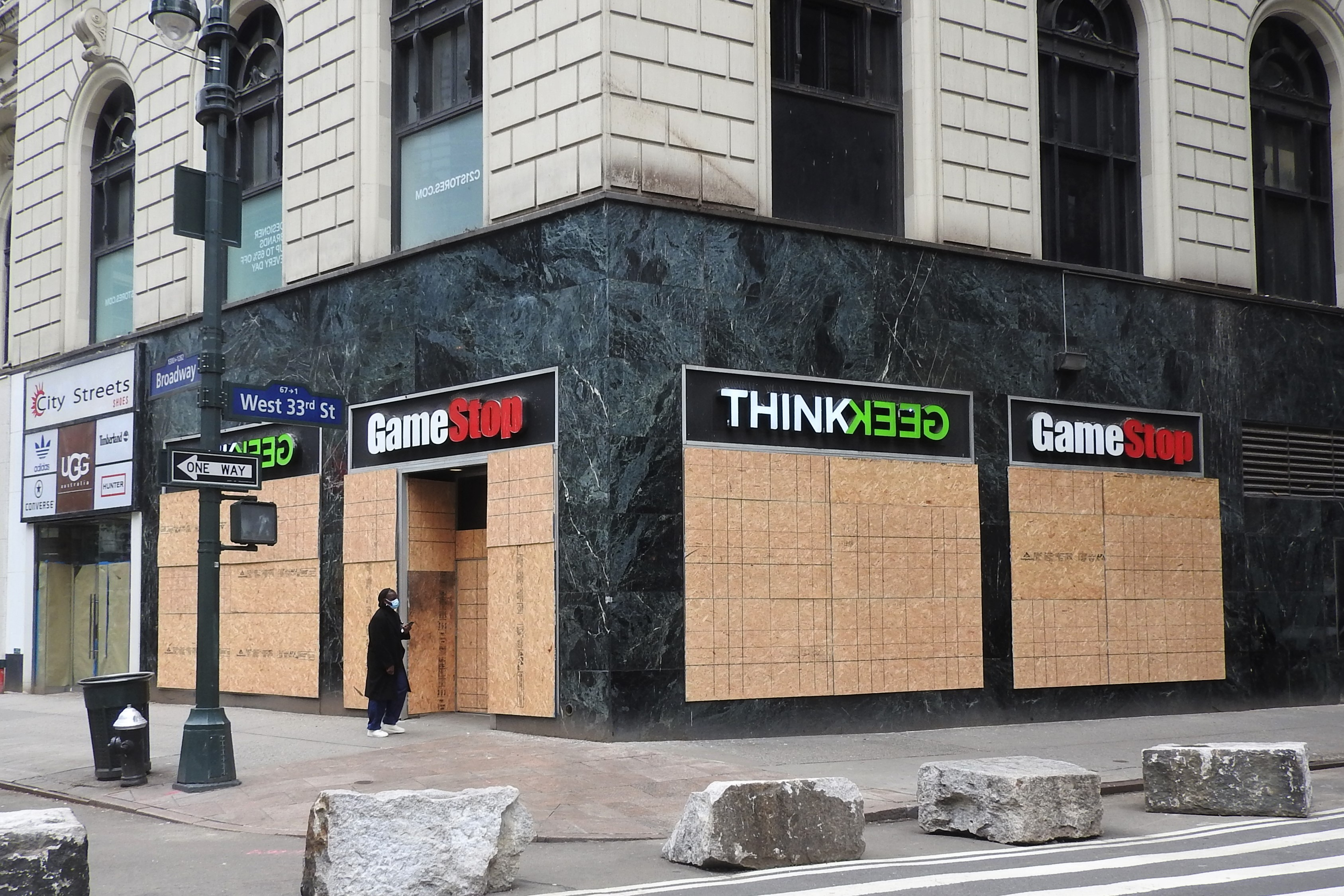
A GameStop and ThinkGeek store in New York City in November 2020, boarded up due to concerns of violence following the presidential election

Government efforts to slow the spread of COVID-19 required GameStop to close the physical operation of all of its 3,500 stores from roughly March to May 2020, though not without some controversy in the early stages. Throughout this time, it continued with online and curbside sales. Sherman and the board of directors took a 50% pay cut while other executives took a 30% cut to offset losses. While digital sales grew by 519%, its retail dropped by more than 30% in the same period from the prior year, and the chain reported a US$165 million loss in contrast to a US$6.8 million for the same quarter in 2019. However, with the Xbox Series X and PlayStation 5 still planned for release in the latter part of 2020, Sherman expected to be able to recover from these losses.

In mid-March 2020, GameStop faced criticism for its response to the COVID-19 pandemic in North America, with employees and social media users accusing the company of placing its business ahead of the safety of its staff and customers, in order to capitalize on an influx of video game purchases and related products for entertainment during the pandemic and related lockdowns. GameStop stated that it would suspend in-store events (including midnight launches) and the use of demo stations, perform additional cleaning, and structure lines and limit store capacity to enforce physical distancing. To prevent enlarged crowds for two high-profile video game releases on March 20—Animal Crossing: New Horizons and Doom Eternal, GameStop announced that it would begin selling Doom Eternal in its stores a day ahead of its official release date.

Polygon reported on March 17 that several stores in the San Francisco area had remained open, seemingly in violation of a stay-at-home order issued by Bay Area counties that restricts non-essential business. Several employees told Polygon and Vice that they did not receive additional cleaning supplies that were to be provided by corporate, requiring them to purchase them on their own and request reimbursement.

A memo obtained by Kotaku on March 19 indicated that GameStop saw itself as an essential business because some of its technology products are relevant to enhancing remote work, required in many cases during the pandemic. GameStop reiterated the safety measures that it had put in place, and also announced that it would reduce store hours and suspend all trade-ins until at least March 29, 2020, and offer curbside pickup. An employee of a GameStop store in Athens, Georgia (which was shut down on March 20 by order of the police to comply with a similar order in Athens-Clark County) disputed the argument, saying that the high-end, gaming-oriented peripherals (such as keyboards and mice) sold at GameStop were not necessarily essential for remote work, and that cheaper alternatives were readily available at stores allowed to remain open, such as Walmart.

California had announced a state-wide stay-at-home order on March 19; while GameStop had originally stated to its stores it was an essential retail business, by March 20 GameStop instead decided to close down its California branches, while keeping most other nationwide stores open. Following similar stay-at-home orders in New York and Illinois over the following days, GameStop announced that it would close all locations effective March 22, with selected locations continuing to offer contact-free curbside pickup (where an employee, wearing either gloves or a bag over their hands, would slip the customer's order through the front door, remaining behind the glass) and home delivery. In early April 2020, a location in Dorchester, Boston received a nuisance citation by local police, who deemed the curbside pickup a violation of the Massachusetts stay-at-home order. GameStop subsequently ceased offering curbside pickup in the state.

===== Canadian division pandemic response =====
GameStop's Canadian subsidiary EB Games faced similar criticism on March 20 as well, as morning lineups for the new Animal Crossing and Doom games at a Toronto location induced large public gatherings discouraged by officials. The city's public health chief Eileen de Villa stated that the gathering did not "line up with what we expect from those in our community who are interested in protecting and strengthening our community". Mayor John Tory accused the company of "placing commerce above the public interest", while Premier of Ontario Doug Ford stated that "everyone in this province has a responsibility to make sure we protect each other and I am very, very disappointed in the store owner that would do this". EB Games later announced that it would close all Canadian stores on March 21.

===== Australian division pandemic response =====
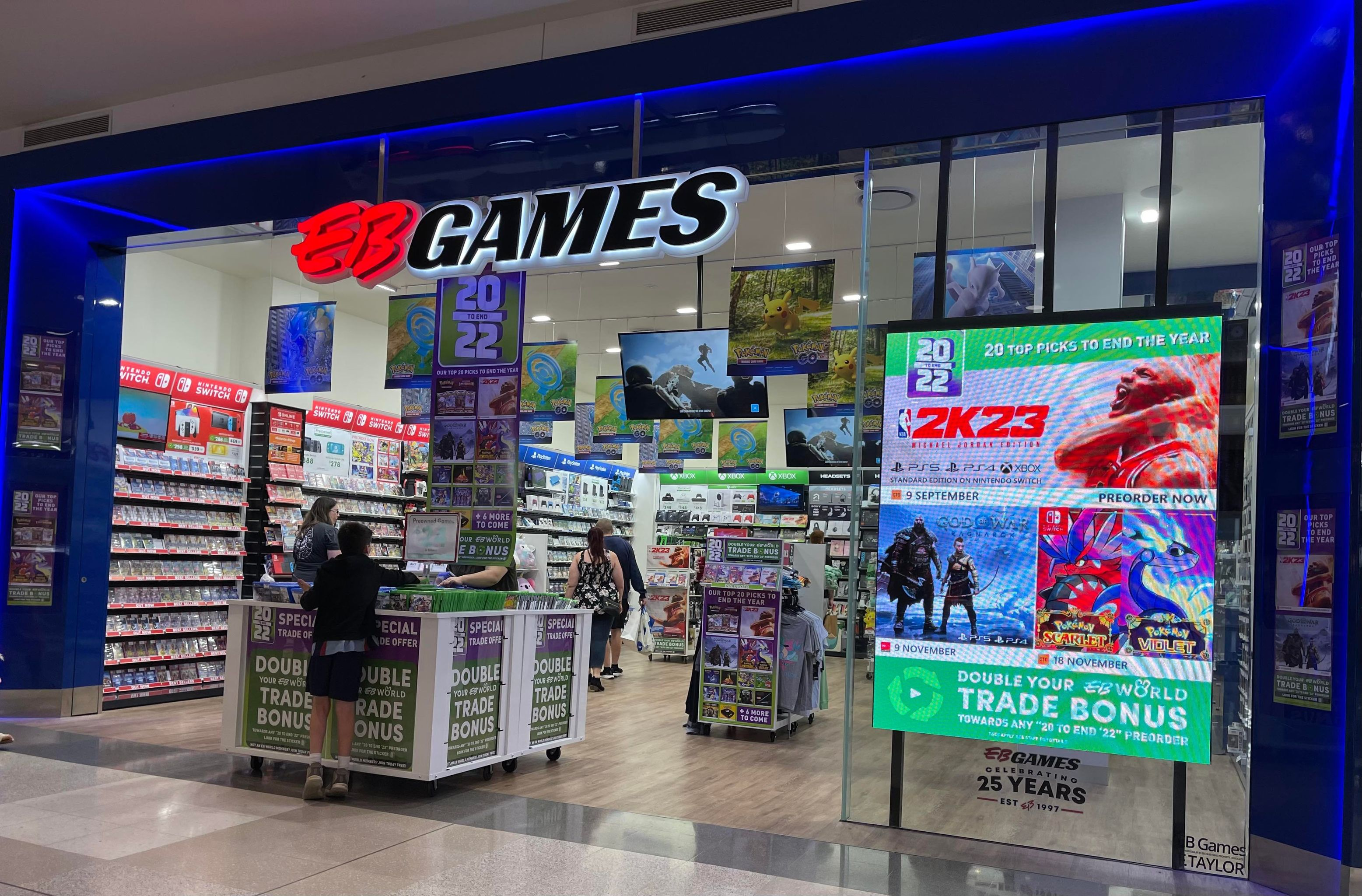
An EB Games store from GameStop's Australian division located in Westfield Chermside, Brisbane, Australia in 2022

GameStop's Australian subsidiary EB Games Australia was the only arm of the global GameStop business not to report huge COVID-related losses, with sales instead soaring by 30 per cent. In Australia COVID-19 lockdowns were managed by the Australian Federal Government National Cabinet which largely permitted retail stores to remain open with capacity limits in place. This meant, unlike other arms of the GameStop business, the Australian arms stores remained open for the substantial majority of the pandemic. National Cabinet only mandated some brief regionally targeted entire store closures with stores in the Australian state of Victoria being the most heavily impacted. For fiscal year 2020 the Australian arm reported net sales of US$625.3 million and operating earnings of US$52.2 million. This was an increase of US$42.8 million in operating earnings compared to the pre-pandemic Fiscal Year 2019 where the company posted net sales of US$525.4 million and operating earnings of US$9.4 million.

==== European decline ====
In December 2016, GameStop closed its UK website, completely leaving the UK market. In December 2019, GameStop announced that it would wind down its Nordic operations during 2020, closing its 100 stores across Denmark, Finland, Norway and Sweden by July 2020, and exiting those countries.

By the end of 2020, GameStop had 954 stores in Europe and sales had fallen to $789 million, with losses of $78.7 million. That November, Ryan Cohen's open letter to the GameStop board suggesting closing or selling loss making operations in Europe was an indication of GameStop's future plans for Europe.

In October 2022, GameStop decided to withdraw completely from Austria and Switzerland, closing their twenty stores. In Germany, its business would be downsized with only 70 of 170 stores remaining open by March. In December, the Swiss business was saved by the small Italian gaming retailer, Cidiverte which operates ten stores in Italy, who took over and rebranded all the Swiss GameStop stores by May 2023.

In March 2023, GameStop decided to leave Ireland after another loss making year accumulated its losses to €45.5 million. It closed its 35 stores by June costing GameStop €13 million in severance payments and lease buyouts. Its warehouse and European headquarters in Swords, Dublin was later sold for €5 million. By the end of 2023, Gamestop had only 647 stores left in Europe, operating in France, Germany and Italy.

In November 2024, GameStop decided to cease operations in Germany, closing its remaining 69 stores by January 2025, as well as its warehouse and headquarters in Tannheim.

Also in November 2024, GameStop sold GameStop Italy to Cidiverte, a small Italian competitor which operates ten stores under the Gamelife brand. Within six months of the sale, over 250 GameStop stores in Italy will be rebranded as Gamelife stores. Thus by the summer of 2025, aside from Micromania in France, the GameStop brand will have disappeared from Europe.

In February 2025, GameStop announced that it intended to sell its French operations. Ryan Cohen condemned the "wokeness" of France, posting on X that the sale would "include wokeness and DEI at no additional cost".

==== January 2021 short squeeze ====
In January 2021, trading activity around a short squeeze resulted in a 1,500% increase in GameStop's share price over the course of two weeks, reaching an all-time intraday high of over US$500.00 as of January 29, 2021 on the New York Stock Exchange.

There is uncertainty around the size of the effect of short sellers closing their position. The SEC released a report claiming "While a short squeeze did not appear to be the main driver of events, and a gamma squeeze less likely, the episode highlights the role and potential impact of short selling and short covering."

==== Other news in 2021 to 2025 ====
In February 2021, GameStop announced that its finance chief Jim Bell, appointed in June 2019, would leave the company on March 26, 2021. Though no official reason was given for Bell's departure, the company said that it did not have to do with a disagreement with the company or its operations.

In April 2021, George Sherman announced that he will step down as CEO of GameStop by July 31, 2021. Also in April 2021, Ryan Cohen, founder of Chewy and a large GameStop shareholder, was named chairman, effective in June 2021. On June 9, 2021, GameStop appointed former Amazon executives Matt Furlong and Mike Recupero as CEO and CFO respectively. Furlong took over the position of CEO from Sherman on June 21, 2021. Furlong was removed from his position as CEO in June 2023 and replaced by Ryan Cohen.

In July 2022, it was announced that Mike Recupero was fired as CFO. He was replaced by Diana Saadeh-Jajeh, who was the company's chief accounting officer. Just a year later, GameStop announced that Diana had resigned as CFO.

In September 2023, Cohen took over as CEO of the company, in addition to his chairman role, without collecting a salary. In March 2024, it was announced that GameStop would cut an unknown number of staff in an effort to achieve profitability. However, the company also noted that these cuts may strain its existing resources.

In July 2021, GameStop announced the rebrand of EB Games Canada to GameStop following customer feedback. In February 2025, GameStop announced that it intended to sell its Canadian operations. Ryan Cohen condemned Canadian DEI practices, posting on X that the sale would "include wokeness and DEI at no additional cost". In May 2025, GameStop Canada was acquired by entrepreneur, Stephan Tetrault, and rebranded back to its previous Canadian brand, EB Games Canada.

==== NFT platform ====
On May 26, 2021, GameStop announced that it was working on a non-fungible token (NFT) platform creating a token that is based on blockchain Ethereum technology. Business Insider reported that "GameStop is building an NFT platform as part of an ambitious plan to transform itself into the Amazon of gaming."

The Beta version of the platform launched on July 11, 2022. The marketplace is curated, with a vetting process in place for artists; in July 2022 GameStop removed an NFT associated with artwork which referenced the photo The Falling Man and removed the ability for the creator's account to mint new NFTs on its platform. In another case, a user sold hundreds of NFTs associated with HTML5 games they did not have a license for. GameStop removed their minting ability and the listings for the NFTs on their marketplace, although the NFTs themselves remain on the blockchain, the games themselves on Gamestop's servers, and can be sold on other marketplaces.

In December 2022, GameStop laid off a large portion of the team working on the NFT platform. In August 2023, GameStop announced wind down of its crypto and NFT wallet citing "regulatory uncertainty". As of December 2023, Gamestop's NFT marketplace still allowed users the ability to trade in-game items using other NFT wallets (such as MetaMask). However, in January 2024, Gamestop ultimately announced that on February 2, 2024, the NFT marketplace would be shuttered completely.

== Business operations ==
=== Atrix ===
Atrix (formerly @play) is GameStop's in-house store brand. GameStop sells gaming accessories, Headsets, Mice and Keyboards under the Atrix brand.

=== Game Informer ===
Game Informer was a magazine owned by GameStop, Inc. It was primarily sold through subscriptions which could be purchased at GameStop locations. A subscription to the magazine was included for members of GameStop's PowerUp Rewards Pro loyalty program. It was discontinued in August 2024, and the following year was sold off and relaunched as an independent company.

=== Trade-ins ===
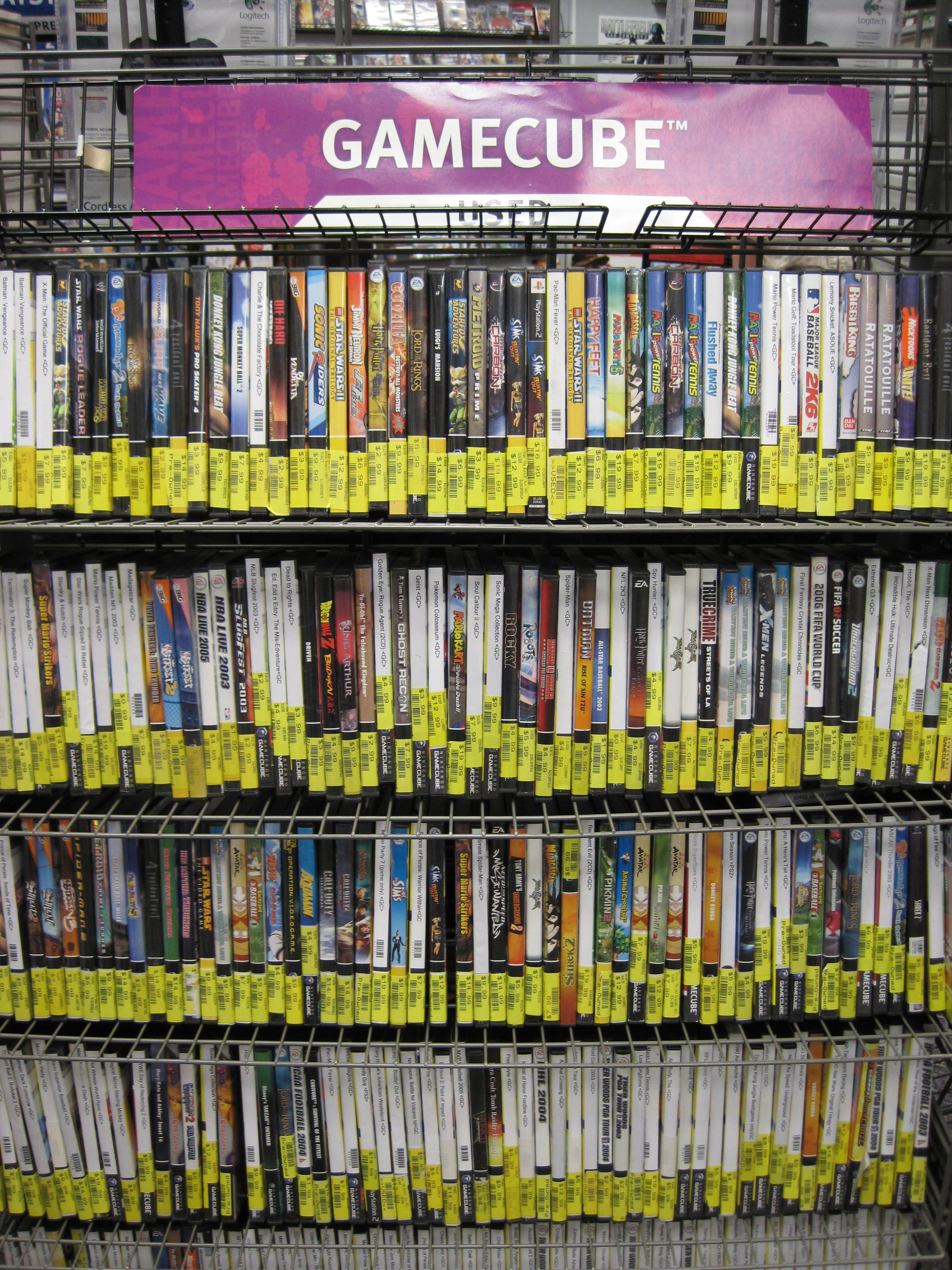
A used game rack for GameCube games at a GameStop in San Bruno, California

GameStop provides its customers either cash or trade credit in exchange for customers' unwanted video games, accessories, and tech. The used video game trade-ins have twice the gross margins of new video game sales. Some video game developers and publishers have criticized GameStop for its practices, as they receive no share of the revenue from the sale of used games. GameStop responded to these criticisms in 2009 by stating that 70% of store credit generated by game trade ins was used to purchase new rather than used games, generating close to $2 billion in annual revenue.

=== GameStop TV ===
GameStop TV is the in-store television network run internally by GameStop, with non-endemic sales in partnership with Playwire Media. GameStop TV features programming targeted to consumers shopping in GameStop stores. Each month brings content segments about upcoming video game releases, exclusive developer interviews, and product demonstrations.

=== Pre-order bonuses ===
Game publishers obtain more pre-orders by including exclusive in-game or physical bonuses, available only if the player pre-ordered the game. Bonuses typically include extras such as exclusive characters, weapons, and maps. For example, GameStop included an additional avatar costume for Call of Duty: Black Ops when it was released in November 2010, and a pictorial Art-Folio for Metroid: Other M. Soundtracks, artbooks, plushies, figurines, posters, and T-shirts have also been special bonuses.

=== GameTrust Games ===
In January 2016, GameStop announced a partnership with Insomniac Games with its 2016 title Song of the Deep. GameStop executive Mark Stanley said the concept was to help the chain have more direct communication with players, and would expect to expand out to other similar distribution deals with other developers if this one succeeds. In April 2016, GameStop created the GameTrust Games publishing division to serve as a publisher for mid-sized developers. In April 2016, GameTrust Games announced it was working with Ready At Dawn, Tequila Works, and Frozenbyte to prepare more titles.

As of January 2025, GameTrust has published two games on Steam in 2016 and 2017 respectively.

=== Buyout bid for eBay ===
On May 3, 2026, GameStop proposed to buy eBay for about $56 billion in a cash-and-stock deal. GameStop already has a 5% stake in eBay through shares and derivatives. eBay rejected the offer on May 12, calling it "neither credible nor attractive".

Following eBay's rejection, GameStop continued to increase its stake in eBay. By August 2026, GameStop owned approximately 9.8% of eBay. On August 10, Reuters reported that GameStop was reconsidering its acquisition proposal and was exploring a potential partnership or joint venture with eBay instead. The reported proposal would allow eBay to use GameStop's U.S. retail-store network to expand its presence in trading cards and collectibles, while GameStop could seek representation on eBay's board. Neither company has publicly confirmed the reported negotiations.

== Controversies ==
=== Lawsuit against BCG ===
In 2022, consulting firm BCG filed a lawsuit against GameStop as the latter allegedly denied payment of fee worth $30 million for a project. GameStop argued that it saw it is in the best interest of its stakeholders to deny payment as BCG brought little improvement to the EBITDA of the company, which the consultancy allegedly promised to improve. BCG counter argued that the company has delivered more than it promised in statement of proposal and that the quoted variable fee was based on the "projected", not realised, improvement in EBITDA, as per the contract.

Ultimately, it turned out that BCG's lawsuit lacked the merit to be carried out in court. GameStop's claim about BCG not having delivered any value and not being owed any money for their supposed "services" was not controversial after all, and the lawsuit regarding these matters was dismissed with prejudice.

=== Nintendo Switch 2 launch day incident ===
On June 5, 2025, a GameStop store in Staten Island, New York had stapled pre-order receipts to the boxes of Nintendo Switch 2 consoles for release day customers. Due to the way the console was packed near the front of the box, the staples were able to puncture the screens. GameStop immediately replaced the affected units and later held an auction for the stapler and a stapled console, since repaired, to raise money for the Children's Miracle Network Hospitals.

== Corporate affairs ==
=== Finances ===
GameStop Operating Income 1999–2021
View source data.
GameStop Operating Income
GameStop International Divisions Operating Income 2003-2021
View source data.
Australia Division Operating Income
Canada Division Operating Income
Europe Division Operating Income
GameStop United States Divisions Operating Income 1999–2021
View source data.
United States Division Operating Income
Technology Division Operating Income
GameStop Total Operating Incomes 1999–2021

GameStop financial figures 1999–2025
| | Australia | | Canada | | Europe | | United States | | Technology brands | | Total | |
| Year | Net sales | Operating income | Net sales | Operating income | Net sales | Operating income | Net sales | Operating income | Net sales | Operating income | Net sales | Operating income |
|---|---|---|---|---|---|---|---|---|---|---|---|---|
| 1999 | - | - | - | - | - | - | $223.7 | $15.3 | - | - | $223.7 | $15.3 |
| 2000 | - | - | - | - | - | - | $756.7 | $5.6 | - | - | $756.7 | $5.6 |
| 2001 | - | - | - | - | - | - | $1,121.1 | $34.1 | - | - | $1,121.1 | $34.1 |
| 2002 | - | - | - | - | - | - | $1,352.8 | $87.1 | - | - | $1,352.8 | $87.1 |
| 2003 | - | - | - | - | $14.8 | -$0.4 | $1,564.0 | $104.8 | - | - | $1,578.8 | $104.4 |
| 2004 | - | - | - | - | $24.6 | -$3.0 | $1,818.2 | $102.1 | - | - | $1,842.8 | $99.1 |
| 2005 | $94.4 | $11.0 | $111.4 | $7.9 | $176.2 | $0.1 | $2,709.8 | $173.7 | - | - | $3,091.8 | $192.7 |
| 2006 | $288.1 | $27.3 | $319.7 | $20.0 | $441.6 | $1.0 | $4,269.5 | $285.4 | - | - | $5,318.9 | $333.7 |
| 2007 | $420.8 | $41.8 | $473.0 | $35.8 | $761.4 | $32.6 | $5,438.8 | $391.2 | - | - | $7,094.0 | $501.4 |
| 2008 | $520.0 | $46.8 | $548.2 | $32.6 | $1,271.0 | $65.6 | $6,466.7 | $530.1 | - | - | $8,805.9 | $675.1 |
| 2009 | $530.2 | $46.0 | $491.4 | $35.0 | $1,781.4 | $67.2 | $6,275.0 | $488.8 | - | - | $9,078.8 | $637.0 |
| 2010 | $565.2 | $41.0 | $502.3 | $22.6 | $1,725.0 | $68.2 | $6,681.2 | $530.8 | - | - | $9,473.7 | $662.6 |
| 2011 | $604.7 | $35.4 | $498.4 | $12.4 | $1,810.4 | $20.2 | $6,637.0 | $501.9 | - | - | $9,550.5 | $569.9 |
| 2012 | $607.3 | -$71.6 | $478.4 | -$74.4 | $1,608.6 | -$397.5 | $6,192.4 | $501.9 | - | - | $8,886.7 | -$41.6 |
| 2013 | $613.7 | $37.5 | $468.8 | $26.6 | $1,733.8 | $44.3 | $6,160.4 | $465.3 | $62.8 | -$0.2 | $9,039.5 | $573.5 |
| 2014 | $644.7 | $38.0 | $476.4 | $28.3 | $1,652.8 | $35.9 | $6,193.5 | $483.2 | $328.6 | $32.9 | $9,296.0 | $618.3 |
| 2015 | $591.4 | $38.7 | $446.6 | $29.4 | $1,356.7 | $48.8 | $6,435.1 | $504.3 | $534.0 | $27.0 | $9,363.8 | $648.2 |
| 2016 | $609.5 | $34.9 | $382.0 | $22.4 | $1,313.5 | $26.0 | $5,488.9 | $430.2 | $814.0 | $44.2 | $8,607.9 | $557.7 |
| 2017 | $702.2 | $34.9 | $434.9 | $18.5 | $1,534.0 | $53.0 | $5,749.9 | $344.9 | $803.6 | -$315.7 | $9,224.6 | $135.6 |
| 2018 | $645.4 | -$46.5 | $434.5 | -$19.3 | $1,405.2 | -$102.3 | $5,800.2 | -$533.9 | - | - | $8,285.3 | -$702.0 |
| 2019 | $525.4 | $9.4 | $344.2 | -$14.9 | $1,098.7 | -$50.2 | $4,497.7 | -$343.9 | - | - | $6,466.0 | -$399.6 |
| 2020 | $625.3 | $52.2 | $258.4 | -$0.3 | $789.0 | -$78.7 | $3,417.1 | -$211.0 | - | - | $5,089.8 | -$237.8 |
| 2021 | $591.8 | $30.6 | $332.3 | -$1.1 | $900.1 | -$39.9 | $4,186.5 | -$358.1 | - | - | $6,010.7 | -$368.5 |
| 2022 | $588.7 | $13.8 | $344.1 | -$8.6 | $901.4 | -$30.6 | $4,093.0 | -$286.2 | - | - | $5,927.2 | -$311.6 |
| 2023 | $522.5 | -$3.5 | $292.5 | -$8.4 | $1,028.4 | -$20.2 | $3,429.4 | -$2.4 | - | - | $5,272.8 | -$34.5 |
| 2024 | $404.9 | -$11.9 | $204.3 | -$10.0 | $638.1 | -$38.2 | $2,757.7 | $33.9 | - | - | $3,823.0 | -$26.2 |
| 2025 | $494.7 | $4.6 | $38.2 | -$22.2 | $429.4 | -$33.5 | $2,667.6 | $283.2 | - | - | $3,629.9 | $232.1 |
Amounts in millions USD

=== Store numbers ===
As of January 31, 2026, the company operated 2,206 stores including 1,598 in the United States Division, 300 in the Australia Division and 308 in the Europe Division.

GameStop Store Count 2001-2022
View source data.
GameStop Total Store Count
GameStop International Divisions Store Count 2003-2022
View source data.
Australia Division Store Count
Canada Division Store Count
Europe Division Store Count
GameStop United States Divisions Store Count 2001-2022
View source data.
United States Division Store Count
Technology Division Store Count
GameStop Store Count Financial Years 2001-2022

Store count
| GameStop Corp. Store Count | 2001 | 2002 | 2003 | 2004 | 2005 | 2006 | 2007 | 2008 | 2009 | 2010 | 2011 | 2012 | 2013 | 2014 | 2015 | 2016 | 2017 | 2018 | 2019 | 2020 | 2021 | 2022 | 2023 | 2024 | 2025 |
|---|---|---|---|---|---|---|---|---|---|---|---|---|---|---|---|---|---|---|---|---|---|---|---|---|---|
| Australia | - | - | - | - | 152^{[B]} | 191 | 250 | 311 | 350 | 365 | 372 | 379 | 379 | 381^{[I]} | 403 | 423 | 425 | 419 | 383 | 375 | 376 | 378 | 365 | 336 | 300 |
| New Zealand | - | - | - | - | 25^{[B]} | 28 | 30 | 39^{[D]} | 38 | 40 | 39 | 37 | 39 | 40 | 41 | 41 | 42 | 43 | 43 | 42 | 41 | 41 | 39 | 38 | - |
| Australia Division Total | - | - | - | - | 177 | 219 | 280 | 350 | 388 | 405 | 411 | 416 | 418 | 421 | 444 | 464 | 467 | 462 | 426 | 417 | 417 | 419 | 404 | 374 | 300 |
| Canada | - | - | - | - | 261^{[B]} | 267 | 287 | 325 | 337 | 345 | 346 | 336 | 335 | 331 | 325 | 322 | 321 | 311 | 299 | 253 | 231 | 216 | 203 | 193 | - |
| Canada Division Total | - | - | - | - | 261 | 267 | 287 | 325 | 337 | 345 | 346 | 336 | 335 | 331 | 325 | 322 | 321 | 311 | 299 | 253 | 231 | 216 | 203 | 193 | - |
| Austria | - | - | - | - | 2^{[B]} | 6 | 11 | 20 | 22 | 24 | 27 | 27 | 27 | 30 | 29 | 29 | 28 | 25 | 22 | 17 | 8 | 6 | - | - | - |
| Denmark | - | - | - | - | 23^{[B]} | 26 | 31 | 37 | 42 | 44 | 42 | 40 | 37 | 37 | 36 | 34 | 34 | 34 | 32 | - | - | - | - | - | - |
| Finland | - | - | - | - | 1^{[B]} | 1 | 13 | 14 | 14 | 17 | 19 | 20 | 20 | 18 | 18 | 18 | 16 | 16 | 16 | - | - | - | - | - | - |
| France | - | - | - | - | - | - | - | 332^{[E]} | 368 | 379 | 391 | 397 | 422 | 434 | 433 | 432 | 425 | 420 | 413 | 399 | 399 | 351 | 314 | 311 | 308 |
| Germany | - | - | - | - | 77^{[B]} | 95 | 137 | 179 | 195 | 205 | 208 | 208 | 209 | 209 | 216 | 217 | 214 | 208 | 199 | 186 | 172 | 154 | 69 | - | - |
| Ireland | - | - | 16^{[A]} | 25 | 28 | 35 | 44 | 51 | 50 | 50 | 51 | 51 | 51 | 50 | 51 | 51 | 50 | 50 | 48 | 44 | 42 | 36 | - | - | - |
| Italy | - | - | - | - | 102^{[B]} | 157 | 218 | 286 | 328 | 371 | 420 | 440 | 431 | 419 | 400 | 386 | 379 | 361 | 343 | 292 | 272 | 268 | 264 | - | - |
| Norway | - | - | - | - | 10^{[B]} | 12 | 16 | 58^{[F]} | 56 | 53 | 51 | 48 | 47 | 39 | 37 | 35 | 29 | 28 | 22 | - | - | - | - | - | - |
| Portugal | - | - | - | - | - | - | 10 | 13 | 14 | 13 | 13 | - | - | - | - | - | - | - | - | - | - | - | - | - | - |
| Spain | - | - | - | - | 123^{[B]} | 101 | 93 | 132 | 124 | 140 | 116 | 110 | 47 | - | - | - | - | - | - | - | - | - | - | - | - |
| Sweden | - | - | - | - | 47^{[B]} | 46 | 47 | 57 | 58 | 63 | 65 | 65 | 108 | 61 | 60 | 62 | 54 | 52 | 30 | - | - | - | - | - | - |
| Switzerland | - | - | - | - | 9^{[B]} | 8 | 10 | 15 | 18 | 18 | 19 | 19 | 20 | 19 | 19 | 19 | 18 | 17 | 17 | 16 | 14 | 14 | - | - | - |
| United Kingdom | - | - | - | - | 6^{[B]} | 6 | 6 | 7 | 7 | 7 | 1 | - | - | - | - | - | - | - | - | - | - | - | - | - | - |
| Europe Division Total | - | - | 16 | 25 | 428 | 493 | 636 | 1,201 | 1,296 | 1,384 | 1,423 | 1,425 | 1,455 | 1,316 | 1,299 | 1,283 | 1,247 | 1,211 | 1,142 | 954 | 907 | 829 | 647 | 311 | 308 |
| International Total | - | - | 16 | 25 | 866 | 979 | 1,203 | 1,876 | 2,021 | 2,134 | 2,180 | 2,177 | 2,208 | 2,068 | 2,068 | 2,069 | 2,035 | 1,984 | 1,867 | 1,624 | 1,555 | 1,464 | 1,254 | 878 | 608 |
| United States – Video Game Brands | 1,038 | 1,231 | 1,498 | 1,801 | 3,624^{[B]} | 3,799^{[C]} | 4,061 | 4,331 | 4,429 | 4,536 | 4,503 | 4,425 | 4,249 | 4,138^{[J]} | 4,013 | 3,944 | 3,864 | 3,846 | 3,642 | 3,192 | 3,018 | 2,949 | 2,915 | 2,325 | 1,598 |
| United States - Technology Brands | - | - | - | - | - | - | - | - | - | - | - | - | 218^{[G]}^{[H]} | 484 | 1,036 | 1,522 | 1,377 | - | - | - | - | - | - | - | - |
| United States Division Total | 1,038 | 1,231 | 1,498 | 1,801 | 3,624 | 3,799 | 4,061 | 4,331 | 4,429 | 4,536 | 4,503 | 4,425 | 4,467 | 4,622 | 5,049 | 5,466 | 5,241 | 3,846 | 3,642 | 3,192 | 3,018 | 2,949 | 2,915 | 2,325 | 1,598 |
| Total Store Count | 1,038 | 1,231 | 1,514 | 1,826 | 4,490 | 4,778 | 5,264 | 6,207 | 6,450 | 6,670 | 6,683 | 6,602 | 6,675 | 6,699 | 7,117 | 7,535 | 7,276 | 5,830 | 5,509 | 4,816 | 4,573 | 4,413 | 4,169 | 3,203 | 2,206 |

^{A} Acquired a majority interest in Gamesworld Group Limited ("Gamesworld"), an Ireland-based video game retailer operating 10 stores expanding GameStop's operations into Ireland.

^{B} Acquired Electronics Boutique Holdings Corp. ("EB Games"), a United States–based video games retailer operating approximately 2,300 stores expanding GameStop's operations in/into Australia, Canada, Europe, New Zealand and the United States.

^{C} Acquired Game Brands Inc. ("Rhino Video Games"), a United States–based video game retailer operating 72 stores and expanding GameStop's United States operations

^{D} Acquired The Gamesman Limited ("The Gamesman"), a New Zealand–based video game retailer operating 8 video game stores expanding GameStop's operations in New Zealand.

^{E} Acquired SFMI Micromania ("Micromania"), a France-based video game retailer operating 332 video game stores expanding GameStop's operations into France.

^{F} Acquired Free Record Shop Norway AS ("Free Record Shop"), a Norway-based record store retailer operating 49 stores. GameStop converted these record stores into video game stores.

^{G} Acquired Simply Mac, Inc. ("Simply Mac"), a United States–based Apple specialty store retailer.

^{H} Acquired Spring Communications, Inc. ("Spring Mobile"), a United States–based Apple wireless retailer.

^{I} Launched Zing Pop Culture, an Australia-based Pop Culture retailer.

^{J} Acquired Geeknet, Inc. ("ThinkGeek"), a United States–based online and wholesale Pop Culture retailer.

=== Subsidiaries ===
As of 29 January 2022, GameStop Corp. operated 32 subsidiaries.

GameStop Corp. (Delaware)
ELBO Inc. (Delaware) | GameStop, Inc. (Minnesota) | Geeknet, Inc. (Delaware) | GME Entertainment, LLC (Delaware) | GS Mobile, Inc. (Delaware) | Marketing Control Services, Inc. (Virginia)
EB International Holdings, Inc. (Delaware) | Sunrise Publications, Inc. (Minnesota) | GameStop Service Holdings, LLC (Delaware) | GameStop Texas Ltd. (Delaware)
Nordic Bear Holdings Limited (Ireland) | GameStop Global Holdings S.à r.l. (Luxembourg) | GameStop Service Company, LLC (Delaware) | GameStop Pennsylvania, LLC (Delaware) | SOCOM LLC (Delaware)
Electronics Boutique Australia Pty. Limited (Australia) | Electronics Boutique Canada Inc. (Canada) | GameStop Europe Holdings S.à r.l. (Luxembourg) | Micromania GameStop SAS (France)
GameStop Austria GmbH (Austria) | GameStop Deutschland GmbH (Germany) | GameStop Denmark ApS (Denmark) | GameStop Europe Services Limited (Ireland) | GameStop Iberia S.L. (Spain) | GameStop Italy S.r.l. (Italy) | GameStop Oy (Finland) | GameStop Sweden AB (Sweden) | GameStop Schweiz GmbH (Switzerland) | GameStop Limited (Ireland) | Polarford Limited (Ireland) | Micromania Group SAS (France)
Micromania SAS (France)

== See also ==
- Play N Trade
- GameCrazy
