= Paul Raines =

Paul Raines may refer to:

- J. Paul Raines (1964–2018), CEO of GameStop
- Paul Raines, a minor character in the television drama 24

== See also ==
- Paul Rains, member of the band Allo Darlin'
