= Free Record Shop =

Dutch retailer

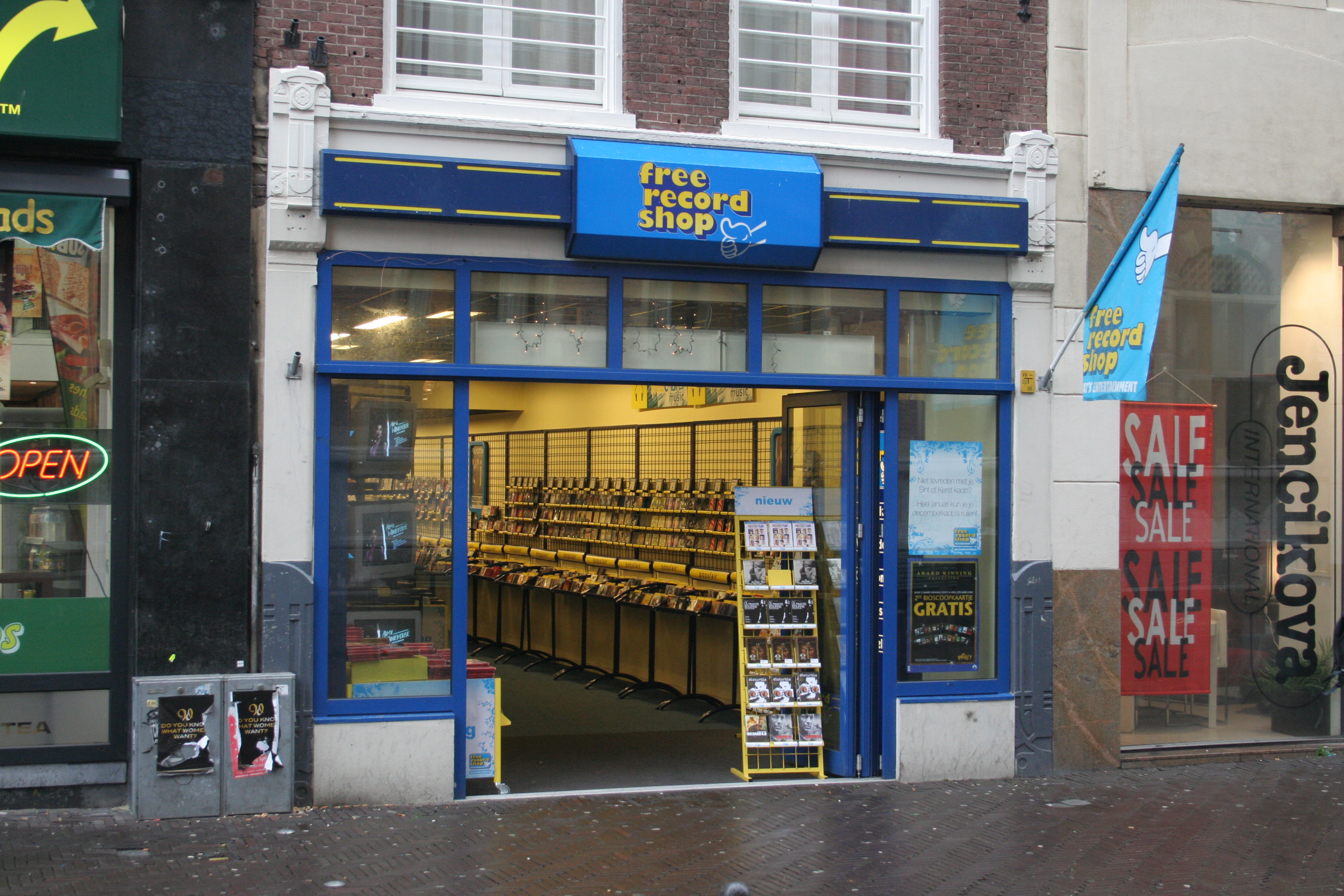
- Free Record Shop branch in The Hague (2008)
- Type: Retail
- Industry: Retail
- Founded: 1971
- Founder: Hans Breukhoven
- Defunct: 2014
- Headquarters: Capelle a/d IJssel, Netherlands
- Area served: Benelux
- Products: Entertainment media & services
- Owner: Hans Breukhoven
- Website: freerecordshop.nl at the Wayback Machine (archived 2011-02-02)

Free Record Shop was a chain of home entertainment stores selling products such as CDs, DVDs and video games, founded by Hans Breukhoven. Its first store opened on 15 October 1971 in Schiedam, Netherlands. At its peak, the franchise had more than 200 stores in the Netherlands and Belgium, but online available music and media supplanted the sale of physical media carriers.

It owned the entertainment products retail chain vanLeest, an Amsterdam-based flagship entertainment store called FAME, a gamestore chain called GameMania and several Build-A-Bear Workshop stores. The company operated multiple online stores using the different brand names.

In March 2008 the company announced that they had sold off the Norwegian and Finnish operations to GameStop, in order to concentrate on the Benelux market.

In January 2012 the company licensed its websites to be fully managed and run by ECI Nederland BV, known for its labels ECI and Cosmox, making ECI the 2nd biggest online retailer in books and home entertainment in the Benelux.

On 24 May 2013 staff and personnel were informed that Free Record Shop had declared bankruptcy. On May 28, the bankruptcy was accepted by a Dutch court. On 22 April 2014 Free Record Shop was finally declared bankrupt.
