= Ryan Cohen =

Canadian entrepreneur and investor (born 1986)

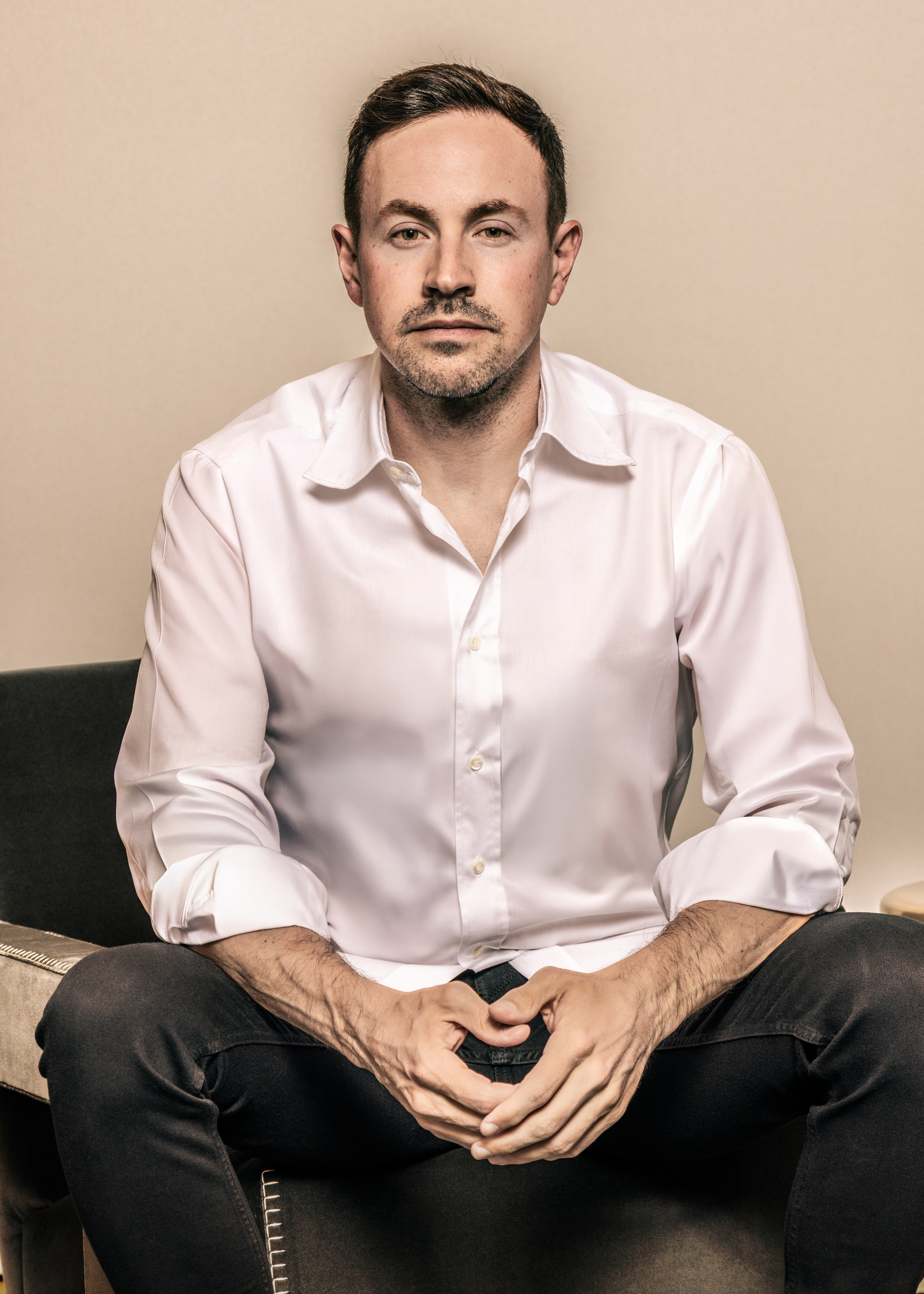
- Cohen in 2026
- Born: 1986 (age 39–40); Montreal, Quebec, Canada
- Occupations: Businessman; activist investor
- Known for: Founder and CEO of Chewy (2011–2018); Chairman and CEO of GameStop

Ryan Cohen (born 1986) is a Canadian billionaire businessman and activist investor. He founded the online pet retailer Chewy in 2011 and built it into the largest e-commerce pet business in the United States before its $3.35 billion sale to PetSmart in 2017, which at the time was the largest e-commerce acquisition on record. Cohen is the chairman and CEO of GameStop, where he oversaw a financial turnaround that returned the company to profitability, cutting costs and expanding into collectibles, with the company reporting record operating income in early 2026.

Cohen has been dubbed the "Meme King" for his influence on meme stocks such as that of GameStop.

== Early life ==
Cohen was born to a Jewish family in Montreal, the son of a teacher mother and a glassware importer father, Ted Cohen. He never attended college, citing his father as his primary inspiration in pursuing an entrepreneurial route. His father died in December 2019.

== Career ==
At the age of 15, Cohen started his first business collecting fees off referrals to various e-commerce sites. In 2011, at the age of 25, Cohen founded Chewy under its original name of MrChewy. Cohen says his inspiration for picking the pet category came from his experience shopping for his poodle Tylee. He cites his father Ted, who ran a glassware importing business, as a mentor. To grow Chewy, Cohen used Amazon's guidelines for supply chain, logistics and the convenience of shopping online but added a focus on customer service, including hand-written holiday cards, pet portraits, and flowers for deceased pets. In need of capital, Cohen says he originally approached over 100 venture capital firms and was rejected by all of them. In 2013, Cohen secured the company's first outside investment from Volition Capital for $15 million. By 2016, he had raised capital from investors including BlackRock and T. Rowe Price New Horizons Fund. That year the company had $900 million in sales and had become the number 1 online pet retailer. By 2017, he raised $350 million and was preparing for an IPO.

In April 2017, PetSmart purchased Chewy for $3.35 billion in the largest e-commerce acquisition of all time. Chewy's value was credited in part to the company's relationship with its customers, from handwritten thank you and holiday cards to committing nearly one sixth of its employees to 24-hour customer service. That year Fortune named Cohen one of its "40 under 40" and Vox named him to its Recode 100 list. Cohen remained CEO following the acquisition and operated the business largely as an independent unit of PetSmart. He grew the business to 3.5 billion in revenue in 2018, including 66% of sales coming from customers signed up for automatic recurring shipments, prior to stepping down as CEO to pursue personal goals and spend time with his family. Chewy succeeded in a category previously marked by the high-profile 2000 collapse of Pets.com. In June 2019, Chewy went public at a valuation of $8.7 billion, more than double its 2017 sale price, and reached $11.86 billion in net sales by fiscal 2024.

In January 2021, Cohen joined the GameStop board along with two Chewy executives. Cohen was appointed chairman of the board on June 9, 2021, to lead a new committee in charge of a company-wide transformation. On September 28, 2023, Cohen took over as CEO of GameStop.

Since joining GameStop’s board in January 2021 and later becoming chairman and CEO, Cohen has led a restructuring focused on cost reduction. Analysts and commentators questioned GameStop's long-term viability, citing declining revenue and the video game industry's shift toward digital downloads. During Cohen’s Tenure at GameStop, the company's selling, general and administrative expenses have been cut from approximately $1.7 billion in fiscal 2021 to $910.2 million in fiscal 2025, a reduction of 47%, and the company moved from an operating loss in fiscal 2024 to net income of $418.4 million in fiscal 2025, aided by growth in collectibles and graded trading cards, which overtook hardware and software as its largest revenue segment. The company’s market capitalization rose from about $1.3 billion when Cohen joined the board to roughly $9.3 billion by early 2026, though the stock remained below its 2021 meme-stock peak. In the first quarter of fiscal 2026, GameStop reported operating income of $143.3 million and net sales of $835.3 million, up 14% from the prior-year quarter; the company said the result represented the highest first-quarter operating income in its history. In the first quarter of fiscal 2026, GameStop reported net income of $389.6 million, which the company said was its highest quarterly profit to date. The result included a $268.4 million unrealized gain on options tied to eBay stock; adjusted net income was $179.3 million.

=== Compensation ===
Cohen receives no salary, cash bonus, or time-vesting stock from GameStop. In January 2026, the board granted him a 100% performance-based stock option award valued by press reports at approximately $35 billion if fully earned, covering 171.5 million shares at $20.66 per share. The award is divided into nine tranches that vest only if GameStop simultaneously hits market-capitalization and cumulative-EBITDA targets, with full vesting requiring a $100 billion market capitalization and $10 billion in cumulative EBITDA, roughly tenfold the company’s value at the time of the grant.

In June 2026, at Cohen's request, The GameStop board approved Cohen's request to drop the performance-based stock option incentive award. According to Cohen, this request was to ensure that GameStop management would remain fully focused on GameStop's operating performance and on the work needed on GameStop's proposed bid to acquire eBay.

=== Investments ===
Following the sale of Chewy, Cohen made a significant investment in Apple, making him the largest individual shareholder of the tech company with 1.55 million shares (6.2 million split-adjusted shares as of August 31, 2020).

In September 2020, Cohen disclosed a near 10% stake in GameStop, making him the company's biggest individual investor. This was later increased to 12.9% on December 17, 2020, through an amended 13D filing with SEC. According to these filings, Cohen's firm, RC Ventures, has expressed willingness to get more involved with the company in order "to produce the best results for all shareholders."

In March 2022, it was disclosed that Cohen had a near 10% stake in Bed Bath & Beyond, through his investment company RC Ventures LLC. Between August 15 and 18, his firm sold all of the stock, totaling 9.45 million shares. The profit was estimated at $68 million.

Continuing his investments in GameStop, Cohen acquired 100,000 more shares on March 22, 2022. Adjusted for the stock split, this acquisition represented 400,000 shares. On June 9, 2023, Cohen bolstered his stake in the company with a purchase of 443,842 shares, equivalent to a $10 million investment.

Cohen has acquired a large stake in Alibaba worth hundreds of millions of dollars. In August 2023, he began communicating with the company's board, encouraging them to increase their share-repurchase program, which they did later that year, extending it to March 2025 and raising the amount from $25 billion to $40 billion.

In addition to his active positions, Cohen also owns large passive investments in Wells Fargo and Netflix.

In May 2026, GameStop, under Cohen’s leadership, made an unsolicited bid to acquire eBay for $125 per share in a cash-and-stock deal valuing the company at approximately $55.5 billion, split evenly between cash and GameStop common stock. Cohen argued that cost reductions could materially increase eBay’s earnings per share, and that GameStop’s roughly 1,600 U.S. locations could provide eBay a national network for authentication, fulfillment, and live commerce. In support of the proposal, Cohen pointed to his record at GameStop, where he had cut selling, general and administrative expenses by roughly 47% and returned the company to profitability after taking over as CEO, and to his earlier scaling of Chewy; the offer set a target of $2 billion in annual cost reductions at eBay within 12 months. The financing drew skepticism from analysts, as eBay’s market cap of over $48 billion far exceeded GameStop’s roughly $10 billion. Cohen’s CNBC interview discussing the bid was described by CNBC as "awkward and at times combative," and drew widespread attention online. On May 12, eBay’s board rejected the proposal, calling it “neither credible nor attractive.”

=== Books ===
In 2022, Cohen published a series of children's books titled Teddy based on lessons he learned from his father. He wrote "My father, Ted Cohen, and his lessons have guided me throughout my life. He showed me an exceptional work ethic and an unwavering commitment to delayed gratification. Even though he is no longer with us, his legacy will live on forever. By writing these books, I am sharing his values and passing his wisdom on to my children."

=== Political views ===
Cohen supported Donald Trump during the 2024 United States presidential election, and promoted the conspiracy theory that the 2020 election was rigged. Cohen has publicly expressed criticism of diversity, equity, and inclusion (DEI) policies. In early 2025, he criticized Canada and France for "wokeness and DEI" and said they have "high taxes, Liberalism, Socialism, Progressivism" that generated a challenging business environment in those markets.

== Legal ==
Cohen was named in a federal lawsuit in August 2022 for an alleged fraudulent scheme to artificially inflate the price of Bed Bath & Beyond's publicly traded stock in a pump and dump. The case was dismissed in June 2024.

== Personal life and wealth ==
As of May 2026, Forbes estimated Cohen's net worth at $5.1 billion, while Maclean's estimated his net worth at $5.6 billion in 2024.

Cohen lives in a $24 million waterfront mansion in Bal Harbour, Florida.
