= Leonard Riggio =

American businessman (1941–2024)

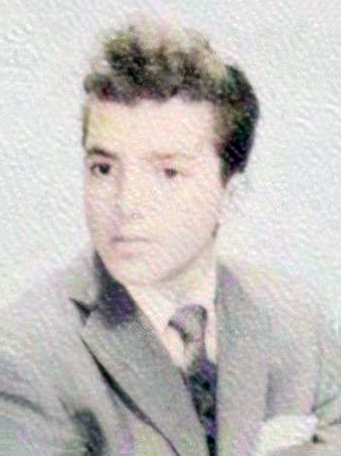
- Riggio in his high school yearbook in 1958
- Born: February 28, 1941; New York City, U.S.
- Died: August 27, 2024 (aged 83); New York City, U.S.
- Occupation: Businessman
- Known for: Executive chairman, Barnes & Noble, GameStop
- Spouse: Louise Gebbia (second marriage)
- Children: 3

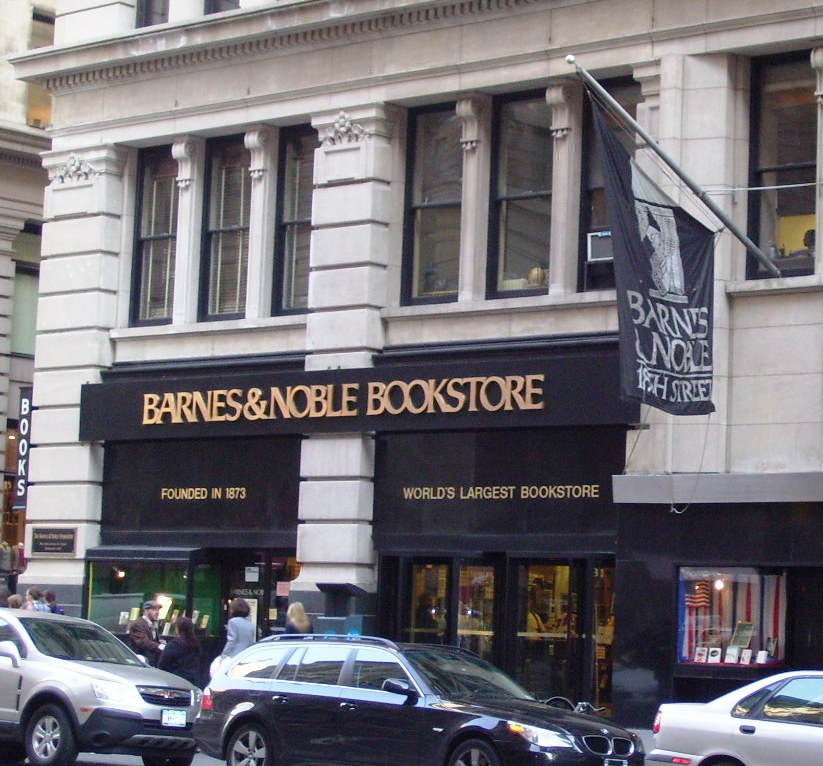
Barnes & Noble's former flagship store at 105 Fifth Avenue in Manhattan, New York operated from 1932–2014

Leonard Stephen Riggio (February 28, 1941 – August 27, 2024) was an American businessman. He served as executive chairman of book store chain Barnes & Noble and was its largest shareholder from 1971 until the sale of the company to the hedge fund Elliott Investment Management in 2019. Under his leadership the company expanded significantly from a single retail location on 105 Fifth Avenue in New York City to a nationwide chain with 600+ stores, which it did with acquisitions and mergers of competing chain stores including his takeover of B. Dalton in 1986, which was supported by a major investment from the Dutch retailer Vendex International and Drexel Burnham Lambert–issued junk bonds.

== Early life and education ==
Leonard Stephen Riggio was born in New York City on February 28, 1941. (Note: N.B. Some sources document Riggio being born in Little Italy in New York City and growing up in Bensonhurst, Brooklyn. Cf. Kirkpatrick (1999) New York magazine, inter alia. Other sources such as Reuters document him as having been born in the Bronx, New York.) He attended Brooklyn Technical High School, graduating in 1958, followed by evening classes at New York University. His father, Steve Riggio, was a professional boxer who twice defeated Rocky Graziano.

His brother, Steve Riggio, was CEO of the Barnes & Noble chain of bookstores from 2002 until his replacement by William Lynch in 2010.

== Career ==
While at New York University, Riggio founded the Student Book Exchange in 1965 and turned this small bookstore into a leading retailer. He acquired the Barnes & Noble bookstore in New York City in 1971 and adopted its name for his expanding company. He acquired hundreds of bookstores through the years and launched the Barnes & Noble superstore concept with an in-store coffee shop and spacious reading alcoves. In 1986, Riggio used junk bonds issued by Drexel Burnham Lambert and a major investment from the Dutch retailer Vendex International to buy B. Dalton; the acquisition made Barnes & Noble the biggest bookseller in the United States.

Riggio is recognized as being among the first entrepreneurs who turned the elitist world of bookstores into recreational stores. In 1997, Barnes & Noble had 483 superstores, 528 mall-based B. Daltons, and sales went up to $2.8 billion. The company went public in 1993. Riggio launched barnesandnoble.com to compete with Amazon.com for online book sales and launched a successful video game retail operation, which grew to become GameStop. By the end of the 20th century, Riggio had built Barnes & Noble into the world's largest bookseller.

From 1985, Riggio was Chairman of the Board and majority owner of MBS Textbook Exchange, Inc. based in Columbia, Missouri. As of 2024 at the time of his death, MBS was one of the nation's largest wholesalers of college textbooks.

== Thoroughbred racing ==
Through his nom de course My Meadowview Farm, Leonard Riggio bred and raced horses for Thoroughbred racing. Among his successes, his colt Samraat won the Damon Runyon, Gotham, and Withers Stakes.

== Philanthropy ==
Riggio was the benefactor of many community organizations and charities, including New York University and the Dia:Beacon art museum in Beacon, New York. Meanwhile as an art collector he assembled a notable collection specializing in Minimalist art. At one time he was listed as one of the top 200 art collectors in the world by ARTnews and the significant works in his holdings included Richard Serra's massive sculpture Sidewinder (1999), Willem de Kooning's bronze sculpture Seated Woman (1969–81), and Mark di Suvero's Caramba (1984–90).

He also established Project Home Again to assist residents of New Orleans, Louisiana, who were affected by Hurricane Katrina in 2005. Project Home Again will spend $20 million from the Riggio Foundation to build new homes in the Gentilly neighborhood of New Orleans. The pilot phase involves building 20 new homes on St. Bernard Avenue. On November 10, 2011, the program cut the ribbon on its 101st home. In addition to rebuilding the homes, the Riggios, through a partnership with Rooms to Go, also furnished the homes. On November 24, 2012, New Orleans Mayor Mitch Landrieu awarded the Riggios keys to the City of New Orleans at a City Council meeting.

== Personal life and death ==
Riggio was married twice and had three children. His first marriage ended in divorce; his second wife was named Louise Gebbia. He owned residences on Park Avenue in Manhattan, in Bridgehampton, New York, and in Palm Beach, Florida. He was active in Democratic Party politics, and served as head of campaign finance for David Dinkins's unsuccessful re-election bid as mayor of New York City in 1993.

Riggio died from complications of Alzheimer's disease in Manhattan on August 27, 2024, at the age of 83.

== Awards ==
Riggio's awards included the Americanism Award from the Anti-Defamation League in November 2000. This award is the ADL's highest honor.

== See also ==
- Jeff Bezos
- James Daunt
- Alexander Mamut
