= Hans Breukhoven =

Dutch businessman

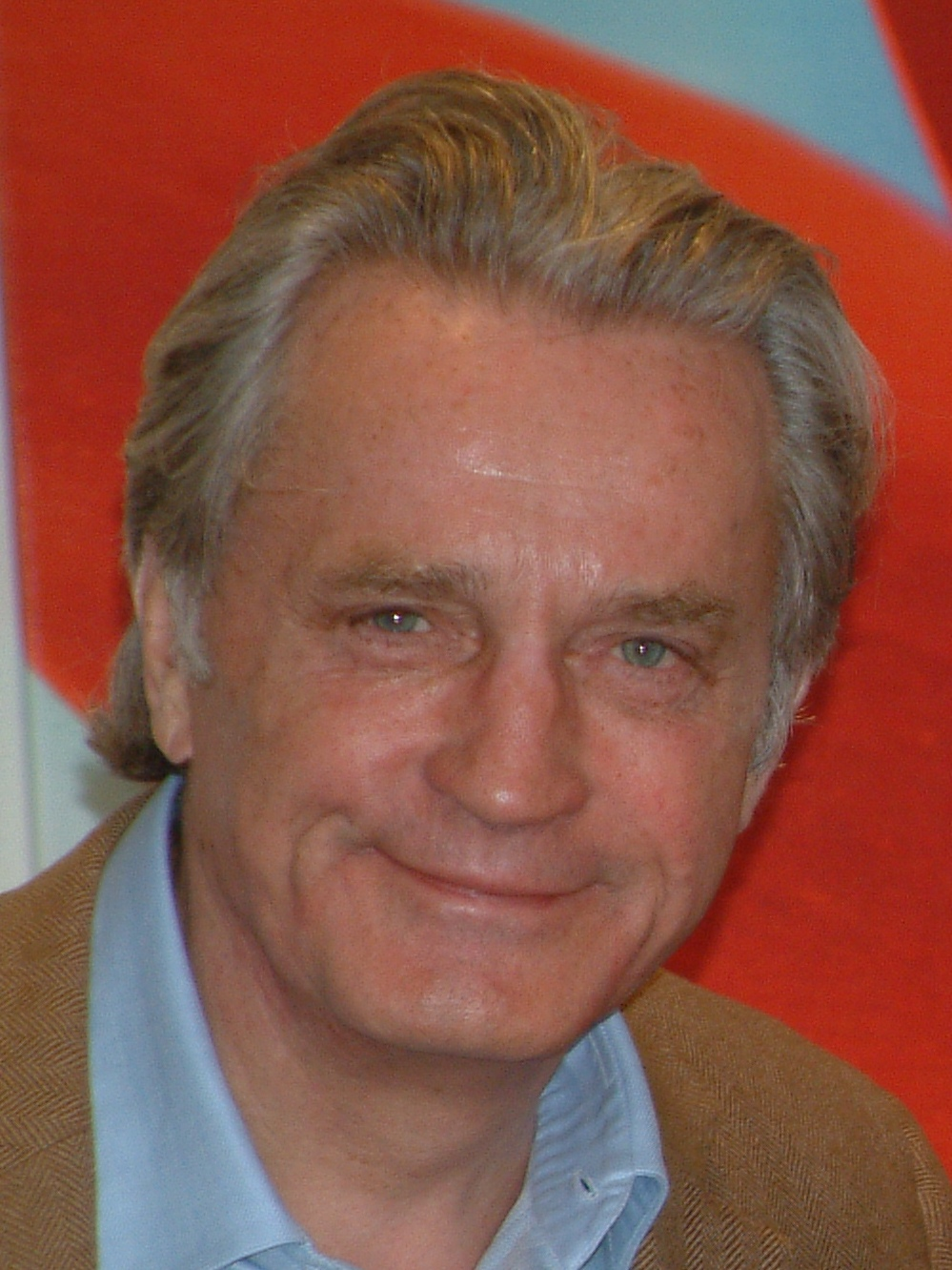
- Breukhoven in February 2009
- Born: Johannes Arie Breukhoven; 31 October 1946; Rotterdam, South Holland, Netherlands
- Died: 20 January 2017 (aged 70); London, England, UK
- Occupation: Businessman
- Known for: Founder and president of Free Record Shop

Johannes Arie "Hans" Breukhoven (31 October 1946 – 20 January 2017) was a Dutch businessman. He was the founder and president of Free Record Shop. He was the son of Adry Hermans, father of five children and ex-husband of Connie Breukhoven (stage name Vanessa). Business magazine Quote estimated Breukhoven's fortune in the Quote 500 at €93 million.

== Career ==
Breukhoven was born in Rotterdam. After leaving secondary school, he trained to become a steward. After completion, he worked two and a half years as a host on the Holland America Line.

On 15 October 1971, Breukhoven opened the first Free Record Shop at Broersveld in Schiedam. In 2008, the chain consisted of 182 shops in the Netherlands and 66 in Belgium. He was also a major shareholder of SnowWorld NV. He died on 20 January 2017 in London after a long time struggle with pancreatic cancer.
