= Micromania-Zing =

Video game retailer

- Type: Subsidiary
- Industry: Retail
- Founded: 1983; 43 years ago
- Founder: Albert Loridan
- Headquarters: Sophia Antipolis, France
- Area served: France
- Products: Video games Consoles; Accessories
- Parent: GameStop

Micromania-Zing (formerly Micromania) is a French major video game retail company in France founded in 1983 by Albert Loridan. From 2005–2014, it tripled its turnover under the leadership of Pierre Cuilleret.

== History ==
In 1983, Micromania was founded by Albert Loridan as a mail order company, specializing in video games.

In 1987, Micromania opened its first outlet in Printemps Haussmann in Paris.

In 1989, Micromania opened its first store at the Forum des Halles in Paris.

In 2005, L Capital acquired 51% of the capital of the French distributor.

In 2008, it was purchased by GameStop for approximately US$700 million (€639 million) in cash.

In 2013, Micromania purchased 44 game stores.

In 2014, Pierre Cuilleret left the Presidency of Micromania and his position at GameStop.

In 2017, the company merged with its sister company Zing Pop Culture and changed its name to Micromania-Zing. Zing, was launched in 2015 for distribution of derivative products of game franchises: manga, comics, films, etc. The consolidating merge addressed the decrease in gaming revenues.
