= J. Paul Raines =

American businessman (1964–2018)

Julian Paul Raines
- Born: April 4, 1964; Costa Rica
- Died: March 4, 2018 (aged 53); Colleyville, Texas, U.S.
- Education: Georgia Institute of Technology (1985)
- Known for: CEO of GameStop (2010-2017)

Julian Paul Raines (April 4, 1964 – March 4, 2018) was the CEO of GameStop, the largest retailer of video games worldwide, from 2010 to 2017.

== Early life and education ==
Raines was born in 1964 in Costa Rica and raised in Atlanta, Georgia as an only child. His mother, of Costa Rican descent, worked as a secretary and occasional translator, and his father, a Vietnam War veteran, became a district manager for a major convenience store operator, after a career in the United States Navy. Raines spent his summers in Costa Rica visiting his grandmother. In 1985, Raines graduated from Georgia Institute of Technology with a Bachelor of Science degree in industrial engineering and a minor in Spanish language.

== Career ==
Raines worked for 10 years at Kurt Salmon, 4 years at L.L.Bean, followed by 8 years at The Home Depot, where he was executive vice president for U.S. stores and president of the more than 2,000-store Southern division. There, in 2005, he prepared for Hurricane Katrina by preparing extra supplies and generators to run the stores in the storm's strike zone.

He joined GameStop as COO in 2008, became CEO in June 2010, and stepped down due to brain cancer in November 2017.

He received total compensation of $9.1 million in 2015 and $7.8 million in 2016.

Raines was a member of the board of directors of GameStop, J.C. Penney, and Advance Auto Parts.

== Personal life ==
Raines was married to Claudia, a native of Chile, and had two children: Victoria and Julian. In 2008, they moved to Southlake, Texas. To understand his customers and to have fun, Raines played video games for 4 hours each week.

Raines funded scholarships for Hispanic students at Georgia Tech and created GameStop's Gamer Fund to help employees in times of need.

Raines was first diagnosed with brain cancer in 2014 and died of the illness on March 4, 2018.
