= Chewy (company) =

Internet retailer of pet items

Chewy, Inc.
- Type: Public
- Traded as: NYSE: CHWY (Class A); S&P 400 component
- Industry: E-commerce
- Genre: Pet supplies
- Founded: June 2011; 15 years ago
- Founders: Ryan Cohen; Michael Day
- Headquarters: Plantation, Florida, U.S.
- Area served: United States
- Key people: Sumit Singh (CEO); Yunyan Wang (CTO)
- Products: Pet food and pet-related products
- Revenue: ▲US$12.6 billion (2025)
- Net income: ▼US$223 million (2025)
- Number of employees: 18,100 (2024)
- Website: chewy.com

Chewy, Inc. is an American online retailer of pet food and other pet-related products based in Plantation, Florida. Chewy went public in 2019 with the ticker symbol CHWY on the New York Stock Exchange.

== History ==
=== 2011–2019: Founding, acquisition and pre-IPO ===
Chewy was founded with the name "Mr. Chewy" in June 2011 by Ryan Cohen and Michael Day. In March 2012, the company estimated a total yearly revenue of $26 million, despite losing money in its first half year. By 2017, the company had revenue of approximately $2 billion and 51% of online pet food sales in the US. At that time, CEO Ryan Cohen prepared to take Chewy public as both Petco and PetSmart approached with merger offers. Petco's offer would be paid for in part using stock, whereas PetSmart offered an all-cash bid that would also allow Chewy to remain a completely separate business. In 2017, Chewy was purchased by PetSmart for $3.35 billion, which at the time was the largest ever acquisition of an e-commerce business.

Following the acquisition, Cohen remained CEO and operated the business largely as an independent unit of PetSmart. Between 2017 and 2018, Chewy's sales increased from $2.1 billion to $3.5 billion, with 66% of sales coming from customers signed up for automatic recurring shipments. Sumit Singh succeeded Ryan Cohen as CEO of Chewy in March 2018.

=== 2019–present: Post-IPO ===
In 2019, Chewy filed an S-1 for an initial public offering, intending to trade under the ticker symbol CHWY. In its filing, Chewy reported a net loss of $268 million on total sales of $3.5 billion for its 2018 fiscal year. In the 2019 fiscal year, Chewy earned net sales of $4.85 billion, a 40 percent year-over-year increase on a 52-week basis. The company saw increased demand from millions of existing and new customers as the business sustained growth throughout the economic disruption of the COVID-19 era.

Chewy launched a free tele-triage service called Connect With a Vet in October 2020. In November 2020, Chewy announced that it would produce and fulfill orders of customized prescription medications, commonly referred to as compounding, for instances where commercial alternatives are absent. In 2020, it was announced that Chewy and PetSmart would split to operate as separate companies.

In March 2021, Chewy reported revenue of $2.04 billion for Q4 of 2020, making it Chewy's first quarter of net profitability, and net sales of $7.15 billion for the fiscal year. In March 2022, Chewy reported net sales of $8.89 billion for the 2021 fiscal year.

In August 2022, Chewy announced the introduction of the CarePlus program, which provides pet insurance and wellness plans. This initiative marked Chewy's entry into the health insurance sector for pets.

In the 2022 fiscal year, Chewy's net sales grew 13.6% since 2021, to $10.1 billion. Following this, in December 2023, Chewy expanded its healthcare services by launching Chewy Vet Care. This service includes the establishment of veterinary practices that offer routine check-ups, urgent care, and surgical procedures.

In fiscal year 2023, Chewy reported net sales of $11.15 billion representing 10.2% year-over-year growth primarily driven by increased spending from both new and existing customers, the strength of Chewy's Autoship subscription program, and the growth of Chewy's pet healthcare business.

In April 2024, Chewy launched Chewy Vet Care, which offers in-person veterinary practices.

In fiscal year 2024, Chewy reported net sales of $11.86 billion, which reflects a 6.4% year-over-year growth. The company's gross margin improved to 29.2%, up from 28.4% in 2023, driven in part by growth in sponsored advertisements that reached approximately 1% of net sales for the full year.

== Corporate affairs ==
The company's founder and first CEO, Ryan Cohen stepped down in March 2018, and Sumit Singh was named the company's CEO in March 2018 after working as its COO since 2017 and previously as an executive at Dell and Amazon. Singh led the company through its IPO; Chewy grew to a market capitalization of $40 billion. The company reported to have employed around 7,000 people in the United States in 2018 and more than 12,000 by 2019. The company has more than 18,000 employees in the United States as of 2021. Chewy is chaired by Raymond Svider of BC Partners. The private equity firm continues to own around 80 percent of Chewy following the latter's IPO, representing 98 percent of the voting power.
