= BuyMyTronics.com =

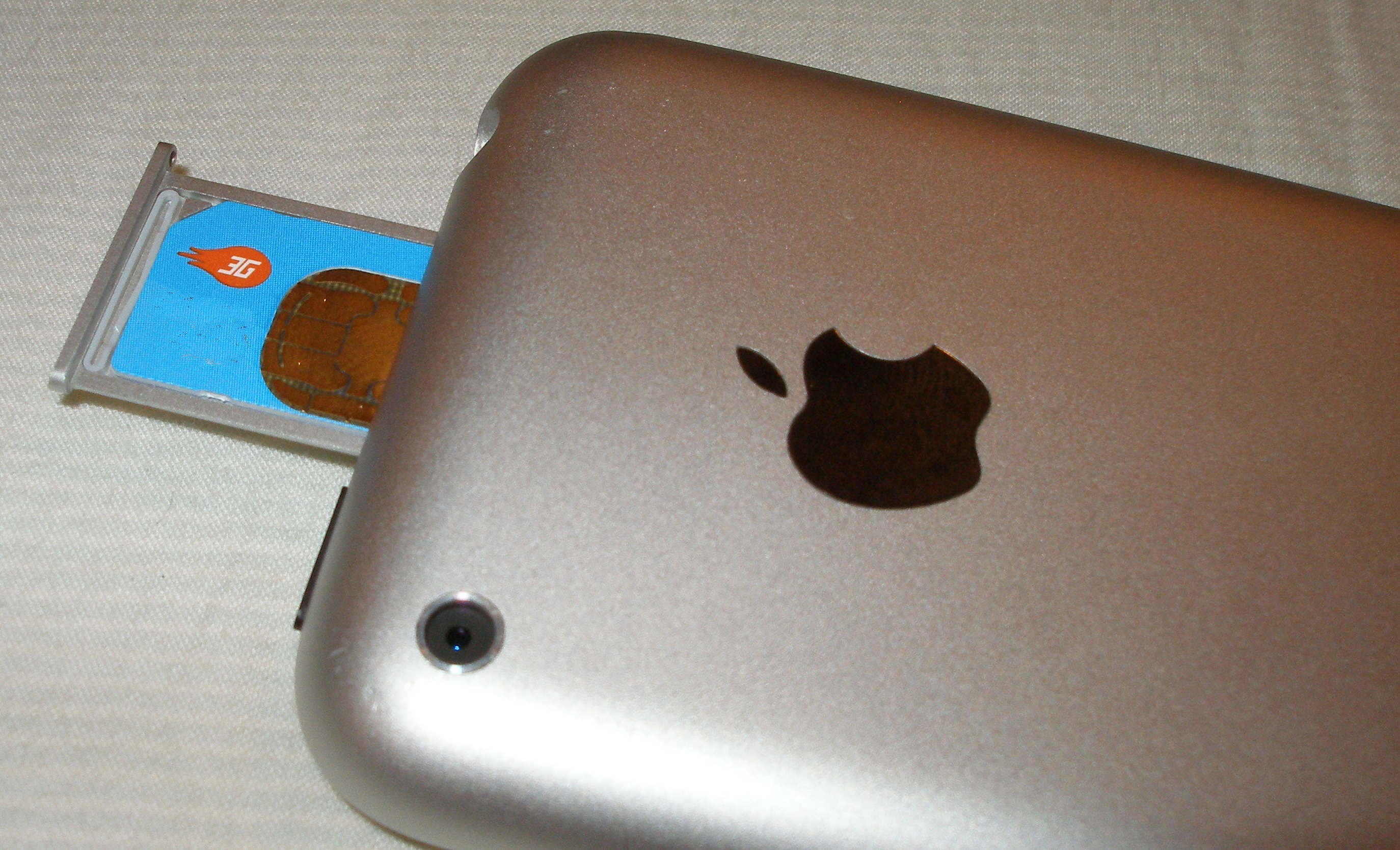
sim slot of the iPhone

Website for BuyMyTronics.com

BuyMyTronics.com was an electronics resale business in Denver, Colorado, founded in 2007 as BuyMyBrokeniPod.com. Its business model was to purchase used and broken cell phones, iPods, iPhones, game consoles, pdas, MP3 players, Apple laptops, and other electronics that have been replaced by newer models.

== History ==
In 2007, BuyMyTronics.com was operated and founded by Brett Mosley. In his first year, he hired two employees, fixed 1,000 iPods, and branched out into fixing his first dozen iPhones and game consoles. Fixed models were resold online, and other models were scrapped for their parts; Mosley stated that this was both profitable and productive toward electronic waste mitigation. His company repaired, resold, or stripped hundreds items of electronic waste per week, including cell phones, iPods, iPhones, game consoles, PDAs, Apple laptops, and MP3 players, and offered free shipping.

In 2013, BuyMyTronics was purchased and became part of the GameStop Network.

== See also ==
- Electronic waste in the United States
- Mobile phone recycling
