= Endeavors (non-profit) =

US non-profit organization

- Founded: 1969; 57 years ago
- Type: Central nonprofit
- Legal status: 501(c)(3) nonprofit organization
- Headquarters: San Antonio, Texas
- Location: United States
- Key people: Jon Allmans (CEO)
- Employees: 200+
- Website: www.endeavors.org

Endeavors, formerly known as Family Endeavors, is a non-profit organization that provides programs and services towards community, disaster relief, employment, housing, mental health, and veteran family services in the United States.

== History and organization ==
=== Urban Ministries (1969–2007) ===
In 1969, several of San Antonio's inner-city churches banded together to launch "Urban Ministries", and initiated programs such as food bank and housing for seniors and runaway youths. In 1977, the scope of housing programs was expanded to include individuals with mental illness. In 1992, employment programs were initiated for those with disabilities. In 1995, after school programs for youth were launched.

=== Rebranding and continued expansion (2007–present) ===
In 2007, Urban Ministries was rebranded initially as San Antonio Family Endeavors with the scope of the organization covering supportive housing, job training, employment, case management, homeless prevention, group and individual counseling, and youth development services. As the organization expanded their services nationally the name was shortened to Family Endeavors in 2013 and then to just Endeavors in 2018.

Since 2011, Endeavors has been receiving federal funding in an effort to end veteran homelessness. Federal funding of $4 million was renewed again by congressman Joaquin Castro in 2016. On May 20, 2016, Family Endeavors expanded their mental health services by formally opening their first of three mental health clinic which operate under the banner of Steven A. Cohen Military Family Clinic operating from within their San Antonio office. The second Military family Clinic was opened in El Paso and the third in Killeen on July 15, 2017, and May 15, 2018, respectively. In addition, to in house care the Cohen Clinics also provide online video counseling services.

== Federal contracts and scrutiny ==
In 2021, Endeavors received two large sole-source federal contracts for migrant services. U.S. Immigration and Customs Enforcement (ICE) awarded the organization an $86.9 million contract to provide hotel beds and related services for migrant families, while the Administration for Children and Families (ACF) awarded it an initial $529 million contract to operate an emergency intake facility for unaccompanied migrant children in Pecos, Texas. Axios reported that the contracts came after Endeavors had hired former ICE official Andrew Lorenzen-Strait, who had advised the Biden–Harris transition team on Department of Homeland Security policy and staffing matters. Lorenzen-Strait became Endeavors' senior director for migrant services and federal affairs several months before the $529 million award. The San Antonio Report, citing reporting by the Washington Examiner, reported that in July 2021 Lorenzen-Strait was barred from future work on ICE contracts after he had reportedly served as an Endeavors adviser while the ICE contract was being brokered.

A 2022 Department of Homeland Security Office of Inspector General report found that ICE had not adequately justified awarding the $86.9 million contract without competition and had spent approximately $16.98 million on unused hotel beds between April and June 2021. In 2026, HHS Office of Inspector General found that ACF had not awarded the $529 million contract in accordance with federal requirements. The audit reported that ACF awarded the contract three days after receiving an unsolicited proposal from Endeavors without first documenting a price analysis; an analysis completed three months later estimated the cost at $245 million, less than half the amount of the initial award.

The contracts prompted allegations of political favoritism. The San Antonio Report reported that concerns had been raised about whether Endeavors officials' close ties to the Biden administration helped the nonprofit secure the two contracts. In April 2021, Republican members of the House committees on Oversight and Reform and Homeland Security said that the size and manner of the awards, Endeavors' relative lack of experience, the timing of Lorenzen-Strait's hiring, and his connections to the Biden administration raised "serious concerns of potential impropriety." In May 2022, Republican members of the Oversight Committee, citing the findings of the DHS inspector general, alleged that the administration appeared to be exploiting the border situation "to reward its political allies with sole source contracts."

== Services ==
=== Children and youth services ===
Children and youth services include on demand case management, clinical and social work and direct care that staff provides on a national scope to evacuation centers, foster homes, corporations, community centers and families.

=== Employment ===
Employment services are provided under the Endeavors Unlimited label for individuals with disabilities specifically Commercial Grounds Maintenance and Custodial Services.

=== Housing programs ===
Housing Programs are the longest running program from Endeavors with a goal of providing permanent supportive housing to individuals and families with mental illness, disabilities, and female Veterans. They follow the Fairweather Lodge model with case management, professional counseling, life skills training, and employment opportunities.

The most notable institution are the Fairweather Lodge/ Family Fairweather lodge located in Bexar county, San Antonio, Texas. Additional homelessness prevention programs for veterans are present in Comberville County and Fayetville, North Carolina.

=== Mental health ===
Steven A. Cohen Military Family Clinics operate in San Antonio, El Paso and Killeen. In addition, to onsite care for veterans telehealth services in the form of online face to face therapy services our available to post 9/11 veterans.

== Collaborators ==
- U.S. Department of Veteran Affairs
- U.S. Department of Housing and Urban Development
- United Way
- U.S. Department of the Interior Bureau of Indian Affairs
- Texas Department of Family & Protective Services
- City of San Antonio
- SourceAmerica
- TIBH: Texas Industries for the blind and handicapped
- South Alamo Regional Alliance for the Homeless (SARAH)
- National Alliance on Mental Illness (NAMI)
- Urban Alliance
- Haven for Hope
