= Point72 Asset Management =

American hedge fund

Point72 Asset Management, L.P.
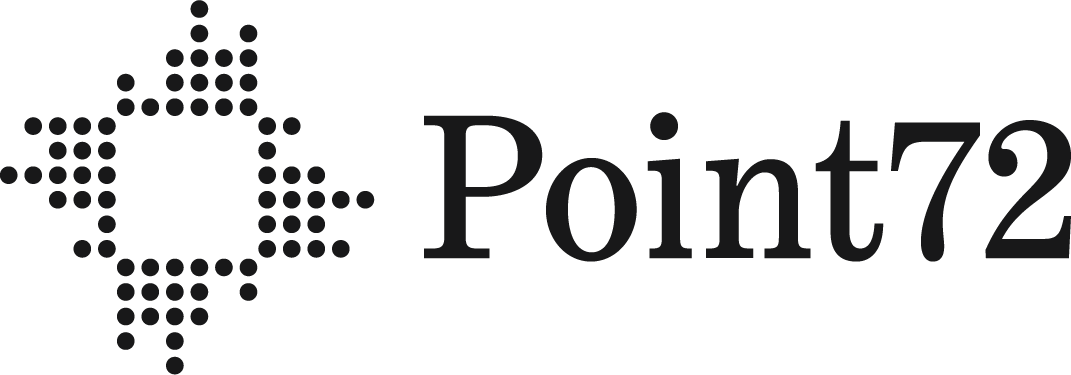
- Type: Private
- Industry: Hedge fund
- Founded: 2014; 12 years ago
- Founder: Steven A. Cohen
- Headquarters: Stamford, Connecticut
- Area served: North America; EMEA; Asia Pacific
- Key people: Steven A. Cohen (Chairman, CEO and Co-CIO); Harry Schwefel (President and Co-CIO); Gavin O’Connor (Executive Vice President); Vincent Tortorella (COO); Ilya Gaysinskiy (CTO)
- AUM: US$45.7 billion (2026)
- Owner: Steven A. Cohen
- Number of employees: 3,000+ (2026)
- Subsidiaries: Everpoint, Cubist Systematic Strategies, Point72 Ventures, Cohen Private Ventures
- Website: point72.com

Point72 Asset Management is an American hedge fund. It was founded in 2014 by Steve Cohen as a family office, after his previous company S.A.C. Capital Advisors pleaded guilty to insider trading charges. In 2018, the company reopened to external investors after a two-year ban and began accepting outside capital. The company's office is located in Stamford, Connecticut.

== Background and history ==
=== 2014 to 2019 ===
Point72 has origins to 1992 with the founding of S.A.C. Capital Advisors, a group of hedge funds founded by Steve Cohen. S.A.C pled guilty to federal charges in 2013 after an 11-year investigation into insider trading. Point72 was founded in 2014 by Cohen as the successor to S.A.C. with the bulk of S.A.C.'s assets being transferred to Point72. Under an S.E.C. agreement, Point72 was initially not allowed to manage money from outside investors. Point72 also took measures to develop its legal and compliance departments, including hiring Vincent Tortorella as chief compliance and surveillance officer, and Kevin J. O’Connor an in-house attorney. Tortorella's compliance team included former CIA, FBI and SEC personnel. Douglas D. Haynes was appointed president.

In 2015, the firm created Point72 Academy, a 15-month paid program to train college graduates to work for the firm. That same year, the firm started Point72 Ventures, a venture capital unit. Initially, Point72 Ventures focused on fintech startups before shifting focus to additional sectors such as investing in AI and defense technology startups.

In 2018, the restriction on managing outside money was lifted and Point72 opened its first hedge fund, securing $3 billion in capital from approximately 20 institutions. Shaughnessy retired in 2018 and was replaced by Gavin O'Connor, who joined the firm from Goldman Sachs. In March 2018, it was reported by the New York Times that Haynes resigned as president "amid [a] gender bias lawsuit, with Cohen assuming the role of president.

=== 2020 to present ===
In August 2020, the firm closed to new money with just over $17 billion under management.

In March 2020, Point72 hired Mo Grimeh as head of its macro investing business, and created Point72 Hyperscale, a hybrid venture and private equity fund for early-stage AI technology companies.

Point72 also has the "Nines" program which was renamed LaunchPoint in 2020. It trains portfolio managers to create a business plan and investing strategy, and build a team. As of 2023, 50% of Point72's long/short managers were from LaunchPoint.

In January 2021, along with Ken Griffin's Citadel Investments, Point72 contributed $750 million to a $2.75 billion emergency bailout of Melvin Capital, a hedge fund that had incurred deep losses in the GameStop short squeeze; Melvin Capital is run by Gabe Plotkin, a former protégé of Steven Cohen and one of the managers of SAC whose trades were investigated by the SEC. In the first half of 2021, Point72 was reported to have lost $500 million on its investment in Melvin Capital.

In June 2025, Point72 Ventures helped fund series A for CX2, a military technology startup. In 2025, Point72 Turion began as a stock-picking hedge fund focused on AI, with Reuters reporting the fund holding approximately $1.5 billion as of January 2025.

In April 2026, Steve Cohen stepped down as president, with co-chief investment officer Harry Schwefel succeeding him in the role. Cohen remained chairman, chief executive officer and co-chief investment officer. As part of the leadership restructuring, Point72 also established an executive committee, chaired by Cohen, to oversee the firm's operations and strategic direction.

In August 2026, Point72 was targeted, among other hedge funds, in a cyberattack involving voice phishing. The firm investigated the incident, contacted law enforcement and cybersecurity experts, and told investors that it did not believe client information had been stolen.

== Operations ==
Point72 Asset Management operates as a multi-strategy hedge fund, employing discretionary long/short equity, systematic, macro, and venture capital strategies. The firm also manages internal proprietary capital and capital from select external investors.

As of late 2025, Point72 reports managing approximately US$41.5 billion in assets and employing more than 3,000 people across offices in the United States, Europe, and Asia.

In November 2025, the firm announced a structural reorganization of its equities division. Beginning January 1, 2026, its fundamental equities business will operate as two entities: the existing Point72 Equities, and a newly established affiliate, Valist Asset Management. The restructuring is aimed at enhancing investment flexibility and team specialization.

Point72 is also expanding into private markets. In 2025, the firm began raising capital for a private credit strategy, targeting at least US$1 billion. This move reflects a broader industry trend of hedge funds entering alternative lending markets as institutional investors seek stable, yield-oriented alternatives to public debt.

The firm also maintains a significant quantitative trading operation through its Cubist Systematic Strategies division, which employs data-driven and algorithmic strategies across global markets. In September 2025, Cubist replaced its head, Denis Dancanet, with Geoffrey Lauprete, formerly of WorldQuant.

== Gender bias lawsuits ==
The firm has faced multiple lawsuits from employees alleging gender and pay discrimination. In September 2020, Point72 settled a gender and pay discrimination suit brought by Lauren Bonner, the company's former Head of Talent Analytics.
