= KFT =

KFT may refer to:

- Kangaroo Flat railway station, Australia (station code: KFT)
- Kanjari language, spoken in India and Pakistan (ISO 639:kft)
- Keeping Families Together, an American charitable program launched in 2007
- Keeping Families Together (United States immigration policy), in effect during 2024
- Korlátolt felelősségű társaság, Hungarian for limited liability company
- Kraftfahrzeugtechnik, a German trade journal, also known as KFT
