= Birgit Derntl =

Austrian psychologist

- Born: Austria
- Education: University of Vienna
- Scientific career
- Fields: Neuroscience, Psychology & Psychotherapy
- Workplaces: University of Vienna; Medical University of Vienna; RWTH Aachen University; University of Tübingen
- Thesis: (2006)
- Doctoral advisor: Ilse Kryspin-Exner; Ewald Moser
- Website: https://www.medizin.uni-tuebingen.de/de/das-klinikum/mitarbeiter/profil/1610

Birgit Derntl is an Austrian clinical psychologist and psychotherapist. She a professor at the Tübingen Center for Mental Health, University of Tübingen, Germany.

== Education ==
Derntl studied psychology (Diplom) at the University of Vienna. She obtained her doctorate (Dr. rer. nat.) in psychology (summa cum laude) from the University of Vienna in 2006. After completing her doctoral studies, she joined RWTH Aachen University as a postdoctoral research fellow of the International Research Training Group. She returned to the University of Vienna in 2009 where she completed her Habilitation in 2012.

== Career ==
In 2011, Derntl was appointed Assistant Professor for Translational Neuroscience in Psychiatry and Neurology at RWTH Aachen University, Germany. In 2015, she was appointed Full Professor (W3) at the Department of General Psychiatry and Psychotherapy, University of Tübingen, Germany. As of 2025 Derntl is a full professor at the University of Tübingen, Germany.

== Research ==
Derntl's research investigates the influences of sex/gender and sex hormones on behavior, brain architecture, and mental health. In this research she uses functional magnetic resonance imaging to examine differences between men and women in the empathy they exhibit. As a graduate student she investigated the role of the amygdala for explicit emotion recognition and studied the effects of ethnic group as well as sex hormone profile. She has researched emotion processing and recognition, and the impairment of empathic abilities in individuals diagnosed with schizophrenia. In depressed individuals, Derntl reported sex/gender differences in approach and avoidance behavior, as well as causal attribution and emotion regulation.

== Honors and awards ==
In 2015 Derntl received the Luc Ciompi Award from the Swiss Society for Psychiatry and Psychotherapy.

== Selected publications ==
- Derntl, Birgit; Kryspin-Exner, Ilse; Fernbach, Eva; Moser, Ewald; Habel, Ute (2008). "Emotion recognition accuracy in healthy young females is associated with cycle phase". Hormones and Behavior. 53 (1): 90–95. doi:10.1016/j.yhbeh.2007.09.006.
- Derntl, Birgit; Finkelmeyer, Andreas; Toygar, Timur K.; Hülsmann, Anna; Schneider, Frank; Falkenberg, Dania I.; Habel, Ute (2009). "Generalized deficit in all core components of empathy in schizophrenia". Schizophrenia Research. 108 (1–3): 197–206. doi:10.1016/j.schres.2008.11.009.
- Derntl, Birgit; Finkelmeyer, Andreas; Eickhoff, Simon; Kellermann, Thilo; Falkenberg, Dania I.; Schneider, Frank; Habel, Ute (2010). "Multidimensional assessment of empathic abilities: Neural correlates and gender differences". Psychoneuroendocrinology. 35 (1): 67–82. doi:10.1016/j.psyneuen.2009.10.006.
- Kogler, Lydia; Müller, Veronika I.; Chang, Amy; Eickhoff, Simon B.; Fox, Peter T.; Gur, Ruben C.; Derntl, Birgit (2015). "Psychosocial versus physiological stress — Meta-analyses on deactivations and activations of the neural correlates of stress reactions". NeuroImage. 119: 235–251. doi:10.1016/j.neuroimage.2015.06.059. PMC 4564342. PMID 26123376.
