= Melvin Capital =

American investment management firm

Melvin Capital Management LP
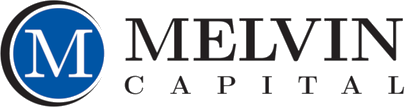
- Industry: Investment management
- Founded: 2014; 12 years ago
- Founder: Gabriel Plotkin
- Defunct: June 30, 2022; 4 years ago
- Headquarters: New York City, U.S.
- Key people: Gabriel Plotkin (CIO); David F. Kurd (COO)
- AUM: US$7.8 billion (Apr. 2022)
- Subsidiaries: Melvin Capital II Offshore Ltd

Melvin Capital Management was an American investment management firm based in New York City. It was founded in 2014 by Gabriel Plotkin, who named the firm after his late grandfather.

On May 18, 2022, Plotkin announced that the fund would close and return any remaining customer funds by June 2022. Its assets under management in April 2022 were about $7.8 billion.

Melvin Capital invested primarily in technology and consumer stocks and was noted for its high annual returns in comparison to other hedge funds. It was reported to have $8 billion in AUM as of January 2021.

During the GameStop short squeeze of 2021, it sustained losses of 53% or $6.8 billion, at one point losing more than a billion dollars a day; in Q1 2021, the firm's assets declined 49%, and it finished 2021 down more than 39% on the year, during which the S&P 500 rose 28.7%. Melvin Capital began January 2022 down 17%.

== History ==
=== Background ===
After graduating from Northwestern University with a degree in economics in 2001, Gabriel Plotkin joined Ken Griffin's hedge fund Citadel, and later Connecticut-based hedge fund North Sound Capital. Prior to starting Melvin Capital, Plotkin was a trader at Steve Cohen's SAC Capital, where he managed a portfolio of mostly consumer stocks valued at about $1.3 billion.

Plotkin was mentioned in the Securities and Exchange Commission's civil complaint against Michael Steinberg, a fellow SAC portfolio manager who was arrested on charges he traded Dell's earnings based on insider information. During his time at SAC Capital, Plotkin allegedly received emails containing illegal insider information, but was not charged with any wrongdoing.

=== Foundation and performance before 2021 ===
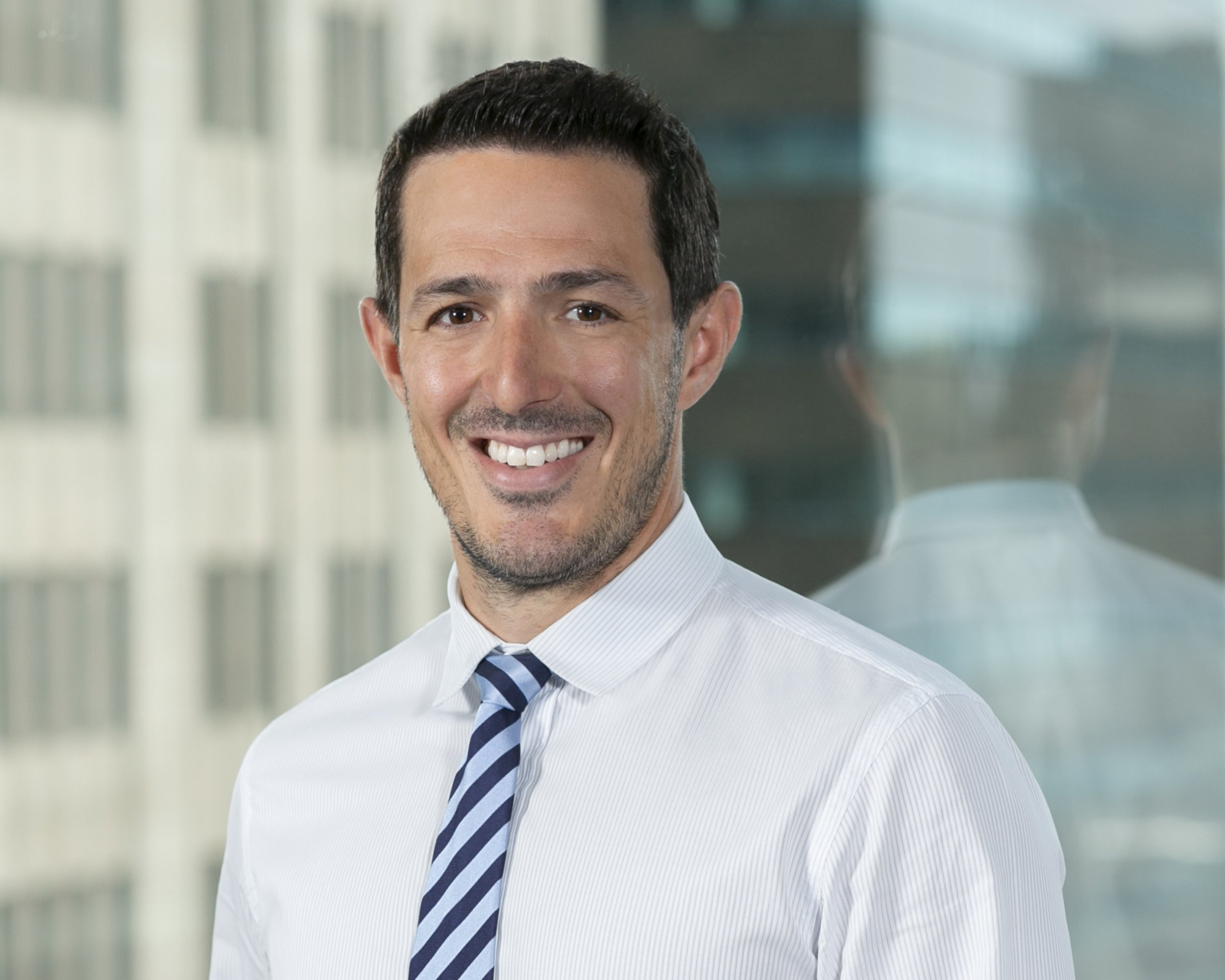
CIO Gabe Plotkin testified to the House Financial Services Committee about Melvin Capital's involvement in the GameStop short squeeze in 2021

Plotkin founded Melvin Capital, after leaving SAC in late 2014, naming the fund after his late grandfather who was a small-business owner. He raised nearly $1 billion. Plotkin described the fund to Bloomberg as "a very human-intensive place. We have a lot of analysts, we require a lot out of them." He also said that the fund has an "intense focus" on the short side (i.e. short selling).

The fund was noted for having high returns between 2014 and 2020, averaging 30% annually. In its first full year in operation, Melvin Capital had returns of 47%, ranking it 2nd in Bloomberg's 2015 list of top-performing funds with $1 billion or more in AUM. These returns were several times that of Steve Cohen's current hedge fund, Point72, in the same year.

In 2015, nearly two-thirds of the fund’s 67% returns (before fees) derived from its short positions. Notable short positions included bets against JCPenney and renewable-energy company SunEdison, both of which ultimately went bankrupt.

In 2017, the fund finished up 41%. Notable investments included Chewy, Amazon, Las Vegas Sands, Alibaba, and shorting GameStop.

The fund had returns of 44% in 2019. According to The Wall Street Journal, about one-third of the gains in 2019 from Point72 came from Melvin Capital.

At the end of 2020, it was reported to have made returns of 52%, making it one of the highest-performing hedge funds. In September 2020 the name of company showed up in the Polish Short Sale Registry (Rejestr Krótkiej Sprzedaży) because of a short position in game developers CD Projekt, a net position of 0.55 percent through the Warsaw Stock Exchange (WSE).

It consistently remained one of the top performing hedge funds until 2021. Melvin Capital charged investors an annual management fee of 2% and up to 30% of its profits, among the highest fee packages in the hedge fund industry.

=== 2021 losses ===
In early 2021 the fund lost over 30% due to numerous short bets that went awry, including GameStop. Users of the subreddit r/WallStreetBets made widespread bets believing that GameStop's stock would increase in value. In January, Citadel and Point72 invested $2.75 billion in Melvin in exchange for non-controlling revenue shares of the fund. CNBC's Andrew Ross Sorkin reported that Melvin Capital had closed (i.e. covered) its short position in GameStop on January 26 in the afternoon, although CNBC could not confirm the amount that Melvin Capital lost. Melvin Capital also refuted rumors that the fund intended to file for bankruptcy. On January 27 Bloomberg News reported that losses had continued past the 30% reported on January 24 by The Wall Street Journal (WSJ). The fund had also repositioned its portfolio according to the source. During the height of the squeeze, Melvin was reportedly losing more than a billion dollars a day.

The short position adopted by Melvin Capital and others resulted in more than 139% of existing shares of GME being shorted, making GameStop stock the most shorted equity in the world. Through the end of January 2021, the fund was down 53%, according to WSJ. In February, Melvin posted a 22% gain; even with this addition, Melvin would need to produce an additional 75% gain for earlier clients before breaking even. At the end of Q1 2021, Melvin reported losses of 49%; at the close Q2 2021, Melvin was reported to be down 46% on the year; and as of November 2021, Melvin was reported to be down 42% on the year. Melvin finished 2021, a year during which the S&P 500 rose 28.7%, down more than 39%.

Subsequent to the GameStop short squeeze event, Melvin Capital disclosed that it was the target of at least nine lawsuits relating to its behavior during that period. Allegations included Melvin's participation in a conspiracy against retail investors, and also that Melvin "made misstatements about their role in the conspiracy to the public." Melvin contended that these lawsuits were "without merit". These lawsuits were later dismissed.

=== 2022 ===
In May 2022, Bloomberg News reported that Melvin Capital planned to close its funds and return the cash to its investors by June 30.

== Executives ==
The fund was led by founder and chief investment officer Gabriel "Gabe" Plotkin. According to Forbes, Plotkin earned approximately $300 million in compensation in 2017, ranking him as the 20th highest-paid hedge fund manager that year.

In December 2020, Plotkin purchased two adjacent properties in Miami Beach, Florida, for a combined $44 million.

Plotkin also acquired a minority stake in the Charlotte Hornets in 2019 from Michael Jordan. He later led an investor group that purchased Jordan’s majority stake in June 2023.

According to Bloomberg, Plotkin earned more than $800 million in compensation during 2020. However, he reportedly incurred losses of approximately $460 million during the short squeezes of January 2021.

David F. Kurd served as the firm's chief operating officer.
