= Affect-logics =

Theory on interaction between feeling and thinking

Affect-logics or Affect logic is a biopsychosocial notion, introduced in 1988 by Swiss psychiatrist Luc Ciompi, relating initially to schizophrenia and other mental conditions, and later elaborated into a general meta-theory on the interactions between emotion and cognition, expanding from the individual level (psychology etc.) to collective phenomena (sociology, politics and more).

It holds basically that affect and cognition, or feeling and thinking, are continually and at all levels interacting with each other in all mental activities, and that there is always an emotional component to any cognitive process.

Affect-logics has found practical applications, amongst others in a European version of the Soteria therapeutic communities initially developed in the US (s below).

== The Affect-Logics Model ==
The term "affect-logics" stems from the German "Affektlogik", and implies circular interactions between emotion and cognition. The model represents a synthesis of empirical data and clinical information across psychology, psychiatry, neurobiology, sociology, psychoanalysis and evolutionary sciences, which highlight the omnipresence of selecting and filtering effects of emotions on all cognitive functions.

== Affects ==
The term affect is used as a supraordinated "umbrella term" covering overlapping emotional phenomena variably called feelings, emotions or moods in different fields of science and everyday life. Based on components common to all of these phenomena, affects are defined as "situation-dependent global psychosomatic states of variable quality, duration and degree of consciousness". So-called "basic emotions" or affects, which are deeply rooted in evolution, include mainly curiosity, fear, anger, pleasure / love, and mourning. They can overlap, combine and differentiate with many subtle nuances. Affective states may be short or long lasting, strong or mild, clearly felt in body and mind or remain largely unconscious, continuing however to influence thought, behaviour and bodily functions.

== Cognition, Logics ==
Cognitive functions such as attention, perception, memory, combinatory thinking and decision making are ultimately based on sensory distinctions (and distinctions of distinctions), and are thus clearly different from global affective states in the above-mentioned sense.~

The notion of logics, too, is conceived in a broad sense: It is defined as "the way in which cognitive elements are combined in order to form broader mental constructions", thus including both formal (Aristotelian) and informal everyday logics, as well as various forms of affect-specific logics (see below).

== Interactions between affects and logics ==
According to affect-logics, conscious or unconscious affects related to present or past experiences continually exert selective activating or inhibiting effects on all cognitive functions. Specific cognitions trigger specific emotions (i.e. affects), and specific emotions trigger specific cognitions, in circular loops. Cognitive elements with similar affective connotations tend to be linked, while dissimilar elements tend to be repressed. These ongoing filtering and switching effets (so-called "operator-effects") of emotions on cognition lead to selective generalizations such as "a wonderful country", "a dangerous place", "a nasty person" etc. All our thoughts and behaviours, and even scientific and mathematical reasoning, are influenced by open or hidden affective components. Unsolved cognitive problems and contradictions are associated with emotional tension, while good solutions are associated with pleasure and relaxation (e.g. the intense pleasure initially related to a new technology, or the so-called eureka feelings related to important discoveries). With increasing habituation and automatization, these initial feelings become largely unconscious, but continue to exert their motivating, selecting and organizing operator-effects.

== Various types of affect-specific logics ==
In the logics of everyday life, the influence of affective components remains usually moderate and rather balanced. However, when strong emotions such as hate, love or anger prevail, various affect-specific logics in the above-mentioned sense emerge, such as a typical logic of hate, a logic of love, or a logic of anger, etc. The fact that these logics are shaped by a prevailing affect does not necessarily imply they are irrational or formally illogical. Examples are the formally strictly logical, but affect-biased pledges of opposed lawyers in court, or the contradictory logical arguments of opposing parties in apparently unsolvable conflicts, from thelevel of individuals, family or groups up to whole nations and societies. Other forms of strongly affect-biased logics are the "logics of mourning" after a severe loss, or the sometimes quite peculiar, but not formally illogical "logics of love" in acute phases of being in love. Hidden emotions such as greed for power or money, fear or jealousy also determine all apparently purely rational economical or political "interests".

== Integrated patterns of feeling, thinking and behaving ==
According to affect-logics, emotions, cognitive processes and behaviours which occur simultaneously are associated in memory as integrated patterns (or "programs") of feeling, thinking and behaving (so-called "FTB patterns"), which store past experiences and influence future thinking and behaviour when similar situations occur. FTB patterns of all kinds and importance are the essential building blocks of the psyche, and their network builds what Ciompi calls an "affective-cognitive Eigenworld" (self-world), i.e. a person-specific, and to some extent also family-specific, group-specific and culture-specific habitual way of feeling, thinking and behaving, or "mentality".

== Affect-logics and evolution ==
Basic affects emerge in evolution as global psycho-physical states which are closely linked to situations and behaviours relevant to survival, such as flight or fight, defence or aggression towards enemies, exploring the environment, identifying secure or dangerous places and objects, bonding and sexuality, overcoming losses. Through affects, body and mind are able to quickly adapt to changing environmental conditions, by categorising between pleasant or unpleasant, harmless or dangerous, beautiful or ugly situations or objects, friends or enemies, food, shelter, etc. At a further level, individual affects can spread out to wider, collective levels through mechanisms of emotional contagion, thus creating affect-specific collective modes of feeling, thinking and behaving. Examples are collective enthusiasm or depression after a victory or defeat e.g. in an important sports competition, or the opposing "logics of war" of the different parties in an armed conflict.

== Energizing properties of affects ==
A further fundamental property of affective states, according to affect-logics, is that they activate (or sometimes inhibit) biological energies, roughly directed either towards or away from specific situations or objects. Affects thus function as the essential motivators, energizers, and (through their categorizing and complexity reducing operator effects) organizers of all individual and social thought, behaviour and communication. These energizing properties of affects, too, are deeply rooted in evolution, because relevant for survival.

== Affect-logics and chaos theory (dynamic system theory) ==
Given the energizing function of affects, affect-logics postulates that FTB-patterns, driven by emotional energy, exhibit typical properties of open dynamic systems in the sense of the general system theory. Hence, current so-called chaos-theoretical notions on the energy-based dynamics of complex open systems are also relevant for mental and social systems.

Chaos theory has shown, in particular, that increasing energetic tensions drive all kinds of open dynamic systems far away from equilibrium, and provoke, when reaching a critical level of tension, sudden non linear changes (so-called bifurcations) in their global patterns of functioning.

Similar phenomena do happen on all levels in the mental and social field : sudden outbreaks of violence, war, panic, freezing, or other disruptions under the impact of critically increasing emotional tensions.

== Affect-logics and schizophrenia ==
According to the hypothesis of affect-logics, the outbreak of psychotic disorders in a formerly non-psychotic person follows similar mechanisms. Such an outbreak is understood as a typical bifurcation in the ordinary feel-think-behave patterns, which can occur in (genetically and/or biographically) vulnerable individuals, under the impact of overtaxing emotional tensions related to stressful situations or events. This hypothesis is strongly supported by numerous empirical studies revealing significant statistical relations between situations of so-called high expressed emotions and the outbreak of acute psychotic symptoms.

In contrast to traditional views, which often neglect the importance of emotions in schizophrenia, affect-logics therefore postulates that schizophrenia can be understood as a primarily affective disorder, with secondary disruptive effects on cognitive processes.

Emotional dynamics play, according to affect-logics, an important role in each of the three phases of long-term evolution distinguished by Ciompi on the basis of his research on the lifelong course of schizophrenia :

In the first, premorbid period a specifically vulnerable "schizophrenogenic terrain" is slowly building up through repeated situations of high emotional tension, as a result of unfavourable genetic dispositions and/or difficult life situations.

The second phase – the outbreak of acute psychotic symptoms – occurs, as described above, when emotional tensions reach a critical level.

In the third phase – the long-term evolution after a first psychotic episode – critically increasing emotional tensions again play a crucial role in provoking acute relapses. Affect logics argues that the typical social retreat, indifference and so-called emotional flatness which often prevails in this phase can be understood as a defence mechanism against new and highly painful outbreaks of acute psychotic symptoms, which may in the long run become hardwired in the brain by the mechanism of neuroplasticity.

== Therapeutic implications, Soteria ==
Ciompi criticises aspects of contemporary treatment of psychosis, including excessively short bouts of hospitalisation combined with high neuroleptic medication intake, as well as, too often, trauma-inducing therapeutic settings characterised by discontinuity and violence.

As an alternative based on affect-logics, he proposes a treatment of acute psychotic states focused on a sustained reduction of emotional tensions, induced mainly by a milieu-therapeutical and psychotherapeutical approach in small, supporting, and as normal as possible therapeutic settings, in close collaboration with family members or other close people.

Based on this approach, a therapeutic community named Soteria Bern was created by Ciompi in Bern/Switzerland in 1984, and operates successfully to this day.

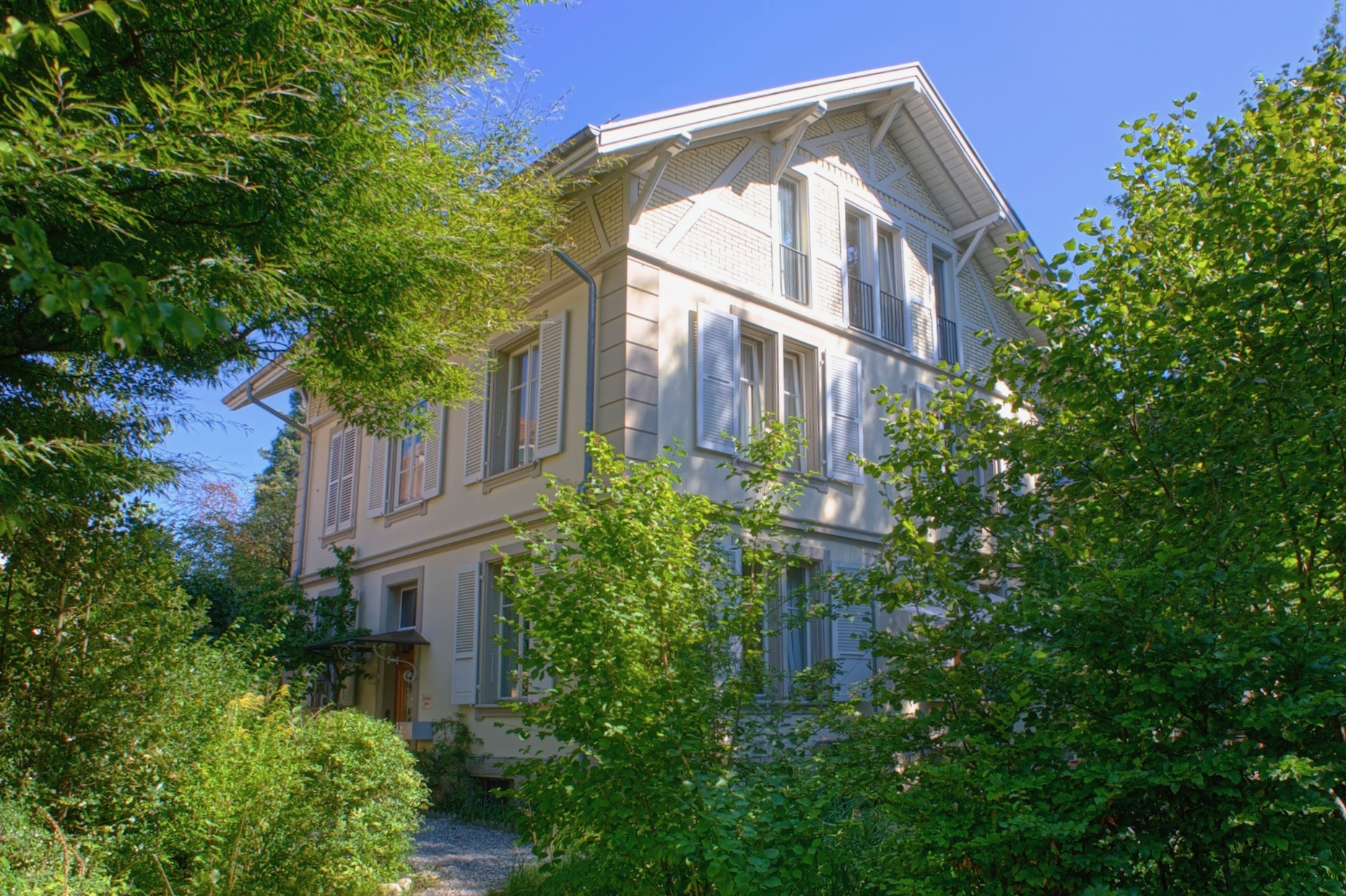
Soteria Bern, founded in 1984 by Luc Ciompi. Treatment methods at Soteria Bern are based on the principles of Ciompi's work on affect-logics.

Empirical research based on matched-pair comparisons has shown that outcome results over two years at Soteria Bern are objectively at least equivalent, and in the subjective experience better than traditional methods, with far less neuroleptic medication and at lower costs.

Several other Soteria-like therapeutic communities have subsequently seen the light in Germany, Israel, and elsewhere.

== Affect-Logics in further fields ==
The affect-logics model has been used to analyze extremist mentalities, particularly those on the far right, as well as the role played by collective emotions in historical movements such as national socialism or the Israeli-Palestinian conflict. It was also used to challenge Niklas Luhmann's work on social systems, positing that social dynamics can only be adequately understood by taking into account the energizing, motivating, filtering and organizing effects of collective emotions on collective thought and behaviour. Affect-logics has found further applications in the fields of philosophy, pedagogy, the problem of consciousness and, most recently, robotics.

== Criticism and limitations ==
The concept of affect-logics has been criticised as difficult to define and measure, making it challenging to apply consistently in research. Some critics also argue that affect-logics places too much emphasis on emotions as the primary drivers of behaviour, and overlooks the role of cognitive processes in decision-making, as well as that of environmental stressors and genetic predispositions.

In some subsequent reviews, the notion of affect-logics has also been challenged for lack of testability and, as a result, for being a-theoretical. However, a set of eight testable working hypotheses on affect-logics has been formulated by Ciompi in a joint paper with American neurobiologist Jaak Panksepp. Furthermore, basic elements of the concept are supported by a computer-simulation of elementary affective-cognitive interactions.

With regards to the Soteria approach, critics point to the limited empirical data and argue that results from the Soteria projects rely too heavily on clinical observation and are not easily testable through scientific means, particularly because they have not sufficiently been subjected to stringently performed randomised controlled trials. Overall, the quantity and quality of empirical support for the beneficial effects of the Soteria approach is still limited, and further research is necessary.
