= Bernard Wohl =

Bernard Jay Wohl (January 4, 1930 – 2006) was an American social worker who was executive director of Goddard Riverside Community Center, a social service agency on Manhattan's Upper West Side, from 1972 to 1998. Bernie Wohl Center is named in his honor.

== Early life and education ==
Wohl was born in Manhattan and attended Stuyvesant High School. He studied psychology at Syracuse University, graduating in 1951, and received a master's degree in social work from the University of Buffalo in 1953. He then served two years as a psychiatric social worker in the U.S. Army.

== Career ==
Wohl served as associate director of Brooklyn's United Community Centers from 1955 to 1961 and as executive director of a settlement house in Columbus, Ohio from 1961 to 1972. Between 1965 and 1969, he also taught social work at Ohio State University. Under Wohl, Goddard Riverside's budget grew from $600,000 to $12 million, and by 1998 the agency had 150 staff and 550 housing units. In 1979, he started Project Reachout, a mobile street-outreach program for homeless people with mental illness. He also led the conversion of single room occupancy hotels, often over neighborhood opposition, into supportive housing for mentally ill tenants on the Upper West Side and studio apartments for elderly and emotionally vulnerable residents in Harlem. In 1983, Goddard Riverside completed Phelps House, a 168-apartment residence for low-income seniors that also housed the agency's offices and programs.

During the urban renewal of the Upper West Side in the 1970s and 1980s, Wohl advocated for low-income housing and testified before the New York City Council and the New York State Legislature in support of social service funding. After retiring, Wohl taught at the Graduate School of social work at Hunter College in 1999 and 2000. He later wrote and lectured on urban poverty, social work and programs for troubled young people.
