= Sid Gilman =

American neurologist (born 1932)

- Born: Sidney Gilman; 1932 (age 93–94)
- Education: University of California, Los Angeles; David Geffen School of Medicine at UCLA; Harvard Medical School; Boston City Hospital
- Occupations: Neurologist; medical educator; physician
- Years active: 1958–2012
- Medical career
- Field: Neurology; Academic Medicine
- Institutions: University of Michigan Medical School; Columbia University College of Physicians and Surgeons; Harvard Medical School; Boston City Hospital; National Institutes of Health

Sidney Gilman (born 1932) is an American retired neurologist, medical educator, and physician. He is an expert on Alzheimer's disease and has spent the majority of his career at the University of Michigan, its medical school, and its Health System.

== Early life, family and education ==
Gilman was raised in California. In 1950, he graduated from Huntington Park High School in Huntington Park, California.

He graduated from University of California, Los Angeles (UCLA) for his undergraduate degree in 1954 and its medical school in 1957, receiving the highest academic honors. During his college years, he was a gymnastics athlete.

He completed his medical residency at Boston City Hospital and a neurology fellowship at Harvard Medical School. He completed a neurophysiology fellowship from 1958 to 1960 at the National Institutes of Health in Bethesda, Maryland.

== Career ==
Dr. Gilman taught at Harvard Medical School after he completed his research fellowship. He worked at the National Institutes of Health and performed authoritative research regarding brain control of motor functions and muscle tone. He began working at Columbia University in 1968, and in 1976 he was named the first H. Houston Merritt chair in research neurology. In 1977, however, he became professor, chair and chief of service of neurology at the University of Michigan Medical School. The hospital's neurology service named after him, as well as a lecture series. He published hundreds of articles and delivered decades of lectures. His university salary eventually was over US$300,000.

His research and areas of interest have involved brain and spinal cord injury, neurological degenerative diseases, and the effects of alcohol on the brain, R.E.M. sleep disorders, Parkinson's disease and Lewy body disease, and cardiac denervation among many other subjects. Some of his research has been in connection with many of the world's largest pharmaceutical companies, including Merck, Pfizer, and Johnson & Johnson. In the 2000s, he also worked as a consultant for Wall Street investors including Pequot Capital and Longitude Capital. These jobs increased Gilman's income by more than US$200,000 per year.

Gilman has held numerous editorial and advisory board positions with major scientific publications, including Neurology, Journal of Neuropathology and Experimental Neurology, Applied Neurophysiology, Experimental Neurology, Annals of Neurology, Neurobiology of Disease, and Alzheimer Disease & Associated Disorders.

== Bapineuzumab controversy ==
In 2013, Gilman was implicated in the insider trading scandal concerning the Alzheimer's medication bapineuzumab, a drug which was being developed by Wyeth and Élan. In exchange for lighter punishment, Gilman agreed to testify and implicate Mathew Martoma of CR Intrinsic, a company affiliated with the hedge fund SAC Capital Advisors. It was considered "the most lucrative insider trading scheme in history." Gilman served no prison time and returned his earnings with interest.

As a result, the University of Michigan disassociated itself from him.

== Personal life ==
Gilman and his first wife Linda had two sons, Jeff and Todd. The marriage ended in divorce. Jeff, like his paternal grandmother, committed suicide.

In 1984 Sid Gilman married Carol Barbour, a psychoanalyst.

After being diagnosed with lymphoma, he received chemotherapy treatment successfully.

== Honors and awards ==
- 1972: Elected Member, The American Society for Clinical Investigation
- 1973: Lucy G. Moses Prize in Basic Neurology
- 1981: United Cerebral Palsy Weinstein-Goldenson Award for Medical Research for Cerebral Palsy and the Physically Handicapped
- 1986–88: President, Michigan Neurological Association
- 1988–89: President, American Neurological Association
- 1992: Professional Achievement Award from UCLA Alumni Association
- 1995: Elected Member, Institute of Medicine
- 1999 Fellow, American Association for the Advancement of Science
- 2000 Fellow, Royal Society of Medicine
- 2001 Fellow, Royal College of Physicians
- 2001 Fellow, American Academy of Arts and Sciences
- 2005: Distinguished University Professorship, University of Michigan Rackham Graduate School
- 2010: Medical Center Alumni Society Distinguished Achievement Award, University of Michigan

== Publications ==
- Vilensky, Joel A.; Gilman, Sid (December 2002). "Motor Cortex Extirpation (1886–1950): The Influence of Sir Victor Horsley". Neurosurgery. 51 (6): 1484–88. doi:10.1227/01.NEU.0000309126.06785.1C. PMID 12445355.
