= Federal Correctional Institution, Miami =

Low-security prison in Florida, US

Coordinates: 25°37′01″N 80°24′43″W

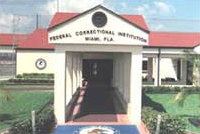
- Interactive map of Federal Correctional Institution, Miami
- Location: Miami-Dade County, near South Miami Heights, Florida
- Status: Operational
- Security class: Low-security (with minimum-security prison camp)
- Population: 1,000 (400 in prison camp)
- Opened: 1976
- Managed by: Federal Bureau of Prisons

The Federal Correctional Institution, Miami (FCI Miami) is a low-security United States federal prison for male inmates in Florida. It is operated by the Federal Bureau of Prisons (BOP), a division of the United States Department of Justice. The institution also has an adjacent satellite prison camp that houses minimum-security male offenders.

FCI Miami is located in southwest unincorporated Miami-Dade County, Florida, about 30 miles (48 km) from Downtown Miami.

A significant portion of the inmates held at FCI Miami have been convicted in the United States District Court for the Southern District of Florida.

== History ==
In 1976, FCI Miami served as a center for youth offenders which explains its campus-like architecture and the presence of a lake in the middle of its compound (the only BOP facility with such landscape feature). In the late 1970s, and in response to Haitian and Cuban immigration patterns, the facility changed missions and became an immigration detention center. It is estimated that between 1977 - 1981, more than 70,000 Haitians (possibly up to 200,000) and as many as 125,000 Cubans (Mariel Boatlift) "Marielitos" migrated to South Florida with many of them being detained at the facility until their legal status was clarified. The facility did not have nearly enough capacity to hold even a significant portion of the refugees, so the Federal Bureau of Prisons, with the assistance of the military and other federal agencies, created detention camps inside and outside Florida to house them.

In the late 1980s, and in response to the drug wars that gripped Miami, the facility changed missions and became an "administrative detention center" for the Federal Bureau of Prisons, housing many of those suspected of participating in the drug wars. With the new mission came a new name and the facility became known as the Metropolitan Correctional Center - Miami (MCC-Miami). The vast majority of those individuals charged would eventually be found guilty of participating in the illicit drug trade at which time they would be transferred to another federal facility to serve their sentences.

While the institution was still an administrative facility and called MCC - Miami, some notable inmates served their time there. Such as Lou Pearlman, Manuel Noriega, and Yahweh ben Yahweh.

Yahweh Ben Yahweh, born Hulon Mitchell Jr., joined the Nation of Islam in the 1960s only to leave it some time later and become a faith-healing Christian preacher. Some in his congregation believed he had a direct line to God, while others believed he was God. In 1978, he moved his congregation to Liberty City, Florida where he brought together the city's Black Hebrew Israelite congregations and founded the Nation of Yahweh. The Nation of Yahweh became active in its new city and engaged in charitable activities and multiple business ventures. All of these activities won them praise around the city and on October 7, 1990, the mayor of Miami, Xavier Suárez, declared it to be "Yahweh ben Yahweh Day." This award ceremony took place a month before Yahweh ben Yahweh and his organization were indicted and charged under the Racketeer Influenced and Corrupt Organizations Act (RICO). Between 1990 and 2001, he and others from his congregation served eleven years of an eighteen-year sentence on a RICO conviction for conspiracy for their role in more than a dozen murders.

In June 1995, the facility changed missions once again and became known as the Federal Correctional Institution - Miami (FCI-Miami). It no longer would house inmates waiting for their cases to be heard in court but would instead detain inmates serving their sentences. At times the facility has been considered a "low security facility" and other times a "medium security facility." It is presently considered to be a "low security" facility.

In March 2024, former White House trade advisor Peter Navarro, who was the first former White House official to be imprisoned for a contempt of Congress conviction, began serving a four-month sentence at the facility.

=== Extraordinary Incidents ===
In 1986, the Federal Bureau of Investigation (FBI) thwarted a daring escape planned by two inmates at MCC- Miami. Gary Wayne Betzner and Terry Jackson Briceno planned to be in the recreation area of their housing unit when a helicopter would fly overhead, drop a rope ladder, and help them escape. Instead, once the helicopter flew over them they spotted three FBI agents in the helicopter and several others on the grounds.

In 1989, another inmate, Benjamin "Barry" Kramer attempted to escape by helicopter. Once again, this attempt failed when the helicopter struck a recreation fence and crashed.

On October 24, 1992, MCC - Miami was struck by Hurricane Andrew effectively rendering it inoperable for one year. The BOP's minimum-security facility (the "Camp") which had been located in Homestead, Florida and also destroyed by Hurricane Andrew, was transferred to MCC Miami's extensive grounds during that year. In 1993 both facilities were re-opened.

== Notable inmates (current and former) ==
| Inmate Name | Register Number | Photo | Status | Details |
|---|---|---|---|---|
| Manuel Noriega | 38699-079 | | Extradited to France in 2010 to face money laundering charges after serving 20 years. | Former dictator of Panama; captured in 1989 in operation Just Cause convicted of drug trafficking, racketeering, and money laundering in 1990 for turning Panama into a transshipment point for Colombian traffickers smuggling cocaine into the US. |
| Bill Campbell | 56204-019 | | Released from custody in 2008 after serving 2 years. | Mayor of Atlanta, Georgia from 1994 to 2002; convicted of tax evasion in 2006 for failing to report over $160,000 in income on three tax returns. |
| Lou Pearlman | 02775-093 | | Died in 2016 while serving a 25-year sentence. | Former impresario for the Backstreet Boys and *NSYNC; pleaded guilty in 2008 to orchestrating a Ponzi scheme which caused investors and banks who invested to lose $300 million; the story was featured on the CNBC television program American Greed. |
| Tim Gionet | 25906-509 | | Was serving a 60-day sentence; released on March 31, 2023. | Participated in the January 6 United States Capitol attack |
| Mark Myrie | 86700-004 | | Served a 10-year sentence. Released on December 7, 2018. | Reggae artist known as Buju Banton; convicted in 2011 of conspiracy to possess with intent to distribute narcotics for arranging the purchase of 5 kilos of cocaine in 2009. |
| Milton Balkany | 55427-054 | | Released from custody in 2014 after serving 4 years. | Rabbi and former Dean of the Bais Yaakov school; convicted in 2010 of extortion and blackmail for threatening to fabricate an insider trading scheme at SAC Capital Advisors unless he was paid $4 million. |
| Joel Greenberg | 73648-018 | | Serving an 11-year sentence; scheduled for release in 2030. | Tax collector convicted on sex trafficking, identity theft and wire fraud charges. |
| Sanjay Kumar | 71321-053 | | Initially sentenced to 12 years in 2007; was released on January 25, 2017. | Former CEO of the software company CA Technologies; pleaded guilty in 2006 to securities fraud for orchestrating a $2.2 billion accounting fraud at the company. |
| Darren Sharper | 34209-034 | | Serving an 18-year sentence, scheduled for release in 2028. | Former NFL player convicted of rape and drug abuse. |
| James R. Gibson | 62228-004 | | Serving a 40-year sentence, scheduled for release in 2034. | Financial consultant who tried to revive National Supermarkets after its bankruptcy and was convicted of fraud, conspiracy and money laundering for scamming orphans and accident victims. |
| Michael Conahan | 15009-067 | | Serving a 17-year sentence; scheduled for release in 2025. Currently in custody of RRM Miami. | Former Luzerne County, Pennsylvania juvenile court judge involved in the Kids for cash scandal; convicted of racketeering in 2011 of taking money from the developer of two for-profit prisons in return for sentencing juveniles to serve time in those prisons. |
| Matthew Martoma | 01138-104 | | Released from custody in 2021 after serving a nine-year sentence | Portfolio manager at S.A.C. Capital Advisors convicted of insider trading. |
| Sam Mangel | 24542-050 | | Released from BOP custody in July 2021. | Businessman sentenced to sixty months for insurance fraud. |
| Peter Navarro | 04370-510 | | Served a four-month sentence at Federal Prison Camp Miami as of March 19, 2024. | Former White House adviser convicted of contempt of Congress. |

== Renaming proposal ==
On April 2, 2024, Representative Guy Reschenthaler and six other Republicans in the House of Representatives introduced a bill to rename Virginia's Dulles International Airport to the "Donald J. Trump International Airport." This infuriated several Democratic House members representing Virginia, including Rep. Gerry Connolly who responded on X that due to the number of felony charges facing the former president, "they find a federal prison" to name after him. The next day Connolly proposed a bill to rename the Miami Federal Correctional Institution as the "Donald J. Trump Federal Correctional Institution". Connolly noted that it was the closest federal prison, 90 miles south, of the former President's home Mar-a-Lago. Neither renaming bill was seen as likely to pass into law. The Bureau of Prisons also pointed out that the reasoning for naming their facilities after locations is to provide clarity to families of the incarcerated.

== See also ==
- List of U.S. federal prisons
- Federal Bureau of Prisons
- FDC Miami
- Incarceration in the United States
