= Gabe Plotkin =

American businessman (born 1978)

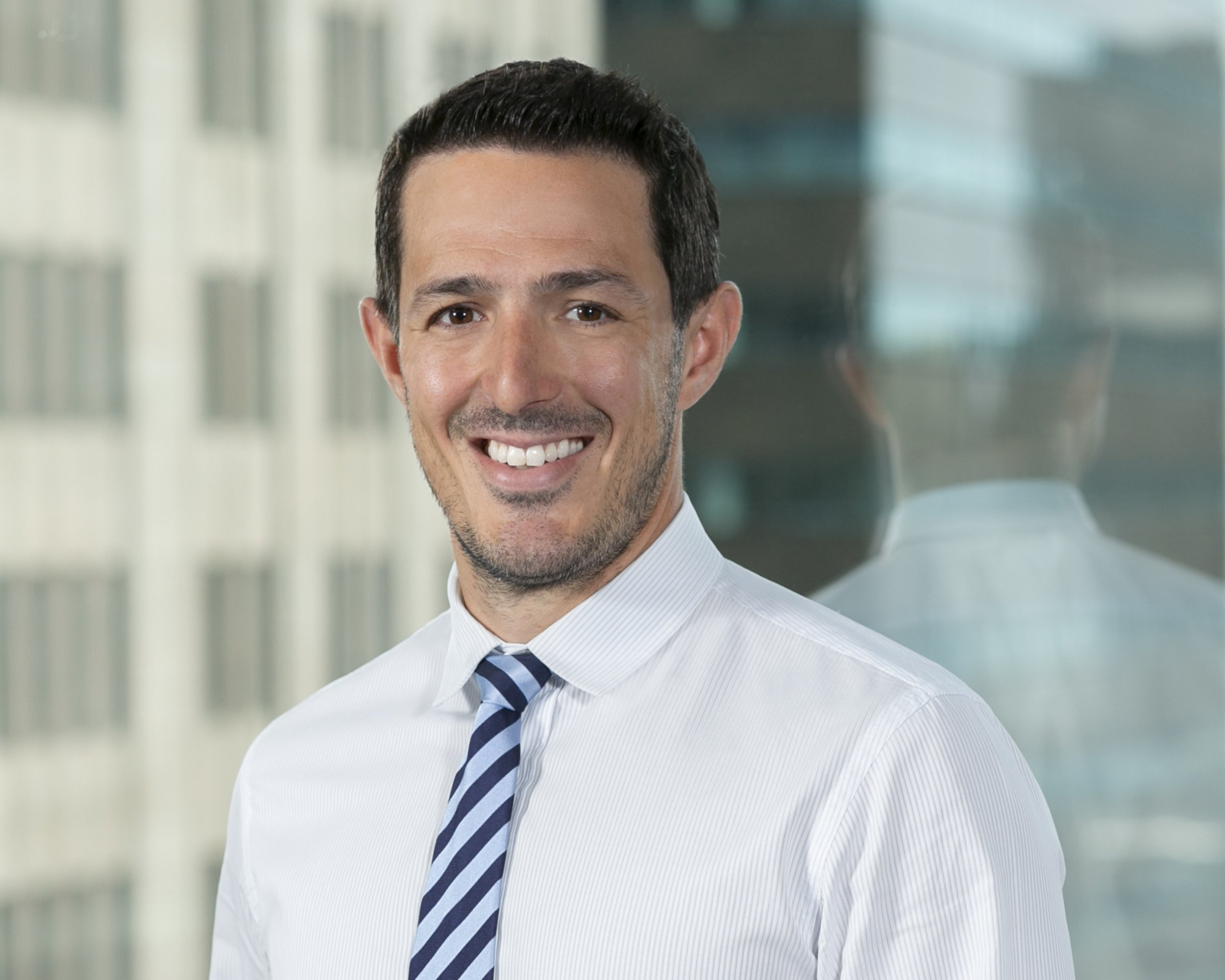
- Born: 1978 or 1979 (age 47–48); Portland, Maine, US
- Education: Northwestern University (BA)
- Occupation: Hedge fund manager
- Known for: Co-chairman of the Charlotte Hornets; Founder of Melvin Capital; Founder of Tallwoods Capital LLC
- Spouse: Yaara Bank-Plotkin
- Children: 4
- Basketball career

Charlotte Hornets
- Positions: Majority Owner, Co-Chairman
- League: NBA

Gabe Plotkin (born 1978) is an American businessman who is the founder and chief investment officer of the former Melvin Capital Management and Tallwoods Capital LLC. He is also a majority owner and co-chairman of the Charlotte Hornets of the NBA.

== Early life and education ==
Gabe Plotkin was born and raised in a modest Jewish family in Portland, Maine. He graduated magna cum laude from Northwestern University with a bachelor's degree in economics.

== Business career ==
After graduating, he worked for Henry Crown and Company before joining North Sound Capital as a consumer stocks analyst. In 2006, he joined S.A.C. Capital Advisors, a hedge fund founded by Steve Cohen, where he was one of its top traders. He managed one of the firm's largest portfolios, valued at over $1 billion.

=== Melvin Capital Management ===
In 2014, with a $200 million investment from Cohen, Plotkin founded Melvin Capital Management, a New York-based hedge fund which he named after his grandfather. It had $3.5 billion under management by 2017. In 2017, with $300 million in earnings, he was one of the highest-earning hedge fund managers. This increased to over $850 million in 2020, placing him in the top 15 highest-earning hedge fund managers. However, his compensation decreased in 2021, due to the impact of the GameStop short squeeze on the fund. Despite receiving $2 billion from Kenneth C. Griffin and $750 million from Steve Cohen, on May 18, 2021, Bloomberg announced Gabe Plotkin would be shutting down his firm.

=== Tallwoods Capital LLC ===
Plotkin founded Tallwoods Capital LLC, a family office focusing on long-term investments, in 2022 and is the firm's chief investment officer. Tallwoods Capital is headquartered in Miami Beach, Florida.

=== Charlotte Hornets ===
Plotkin purchased a minority stake in the Charlotte Hornets in 2019, and subsequently served as an alternate governor on the NBA Board of Governors. In June 2023, Plotkin along with Rick Schnall purchased the Charlotte Hornets from majority owner Michael Jordan, who will continue to hold a minority interest. He is currently the team's co-chairman.

== Personal life ==
He is married to Queens, New York native Yaara Bank-Plotkin, with whom he has four children. He is of Jewish descent.

== Philanthropy ==
Plotkin contributes to philanthropic causes for the IDF, veterans, and the Jewish community. He is on the board of advisors to Children of Fallen Patriots Foundation, an organization that provides scholarships and mentorship to individuals who lost a parent in the line of duty. Through the Gabriel and Yaara Plotkin Family Foundation, he and his wife have supported organizations like the Wounded Warrior Project, Chabad of Southampton, Belev Echad, and the Tribe of Nova Foundation.

== In popular culture ==
Plotkin is portrayed by Seth Rogen in the 2023 film Dumb Money, a biographical comedy-drama about the GameStop short squeeze.

Sporting positions
Preceded by Michael Jordan	Charlotte Bobcats/Hornets principal owner 2023–present Served alongside: Rick Schnall	Incumbent
