= Mathew Martoma =

American former hedge fund trader and criminal

- Born: Ajai Mathew Thomas; May 18, 1974 (age 51); Michigan, U.S.
- Other names: Mathew Cochukattil Martoma
- Education: Duke University (BS); Stanford University (MBA, revoked)
- Occupation: Portfolio manager
- Known for: Insider trading conviction
- Imprisoned at: FCI Miami (2014-2021)

Mathew Martoma (born May 18, 1974, as Ajai Mathew Mariamdani Thomas) is an American former hedge fund trader. As a portfolio manager at S.A.C. Capital Advisors, he was accused of generating possibly the largest single insider trading transaction profit in history at a value of $276 million. A jury convicted him, and in November 2014 he began serving a nine-year prison sentence. He was incarcerated at FCI Miami as inmate 01138-104, and released early on 19 July 2021.

== Early life ==
Martoma was born Ajai Mathew Thomas in Michigan and grew up in Merritt Island, Florida. His mother, Lizzie, is a doctor and his father, Bobby (formerly Cochukattil Thomas), owns a dry cleaning and laundry company. Both are immigrants from India. Martoma belongs to the Malankara Orthodox church based in Kerala, India.

He graduated from Merritt Island High School in 1992. He graduated from Duke University and then attended Harvard Law School, but was expelled in 1999 for grade manipulation and dishonesty. He had used computer software to create a fake transcript with better grades which he then sent to federal judges in an attempt to secure a clerkship. After leaving Harvard, he legally changed his name from Ajai Mathew Thomas to Mathew Cochukattil Martoma in 2001.

He then applied and was accepted to Stanford Graduate School of Business, where he received an MBA in 2003. After Martoma's trial, where it was revealed that he had been expelled from Harvard but did not disclose that to Stanford, Stanford took back his degree for being admitted under false pretenses.

Martoma worked as a portfolio manager at S.A.C. Capital Advisors. He was hired in 2006 after working for three years at Sirios Capital Management. Martoma owned a $2 million mansion in Boca Raton. This residence was forfeited as part of Martoma's sentencing.

== Trial ==
According to the criminal complaint filed by the U.S. Department of Justice, Martoma allegedly advised Steven A. Cohen to sell shares of pharmaceutical companies Wyeth and Elan Corporation based on tips from two doctors, including Sid Gilman of the University of Michigan, about the Alzheimer's disease drug bapineuzumab during clinical trials overseen by the FDA. Martoma was introduced to Gilman by GLG Group, a so-called expert network company. Martoma pleaded not guilty to formal charges of securities fraud, two counts, and conspiracy which resulted in $276 million in profits for SAC Capital in 2008. The insider trading trial began on January 9, 2014 in the United States District Court for the Southern District of New York. A jury of seven women and five men were selected to evaluate the evidence in a courtroom presided by U.S. District Judge Paul Gardephe.

On February 6, 2014, Martoma was found guilty on all charges. On September 8, 2014, Martoma was sentenced to 9 years in prison. In addition, Martoma must forfeit his $9.38 million bonus which he earned in 2008.

In August 2017, a divided panel of the United States Court of Appeals for the Second Circuit upheld the conviction. In June 2018, the again divided panel issued an amended opinion reaching the same result. On June 3, 2019, the Supreme Court declined to hear Martoma's case, leaving his sentence in place. He was released early July 19, 2021.

== Personal life ==
Martoma is married to Dr. Rosemary A. Martoma (née Kurian), a pediatrician; the couple have three children.

== See also ==
- Chip Skowron, hedge fund portfolio manager convicted of insider trading
