= Loren Mosher =

American psychiatrist (1933–2004)

- Born: 3 September 1933; Monterey, California, US
- Died: 10 July 2004 (aged 70); Berlin, Germany
- Education: Stanford University, Harvard University
- Known for: Creating Soteria, founding Schizophrenia Bulletin
- Scientific career
- Fields: Psychiatry
- Workplaces: Yale University, National Institute of Mental Health, Uniformed Services University of the Health Sciences, University of California, American Psychiatric Association, MindFreedom International, Mosher's consulting company Soteria Associates
- Website: www.moshersoteria.com

Loren Richard Mosher (September 3, 1933, Monterey, California – July 10, 2004, Berlin) was an American psychiatrist, clinical professor of psychiatry, expert on schizophrenia and the chief of the Center for Studies of Schizophrenia in the National Institute of Mental Health (1968–1980). Mosher spent his professional career advocating for humane and effective treatment for people diagnosed as having schizophrenia and was instrumental in developing an innovative, residential, home-like, non-hospital, non-drug treatment model for newly identified acutely psychotic persons.

In the 1970s, Mosher, then Chief of the newly formed Center for Schizophrenia Research, wrote a grant to obtain funding for a novel idea for treating people diagnosed with schizophrenia; an intensive psychosocial milieu-based residential treatment known as the Soteria Project. The results of the study were remarkable and showed that people with schizophrenia did in fact recover from the illness without the use of neuroleptics in a supportive home-like environment.

Progressively vocal in his opposition to the prevailing psychiatric practices of the time and the increasing reliance on pharmaceuticals for treatment, Mosher managed to anger and isolate himself from many of his colleagues at the National Institute of Mental Health, and was finally dismissed from his position in 1980. Disillusioned with the field, he wrote a very public letter of resignation from the American Psychiatric Association in 1998, stating that "After nearly three decades as a member it is with a mixture of pleasure and disappointment that I submit this letter of resignation from the American Psychiatric Association. The major reason for this action is my belief that I am actually resigning from the American Psychopharmacological Association. Luckily, the organization's true identity requires no change in the acronym."

== Biography ==
Loren Mosher was born on September 3, 1933, in Monterey, California, to the married couple of a teacher and boat builder. He earned his undergraduate degree from Stanford University and his medical degree from Harvard University, starting work at NIMH in 1964. He undertook research training at the Tavistock Clinic in London from 1966 to 1967 and developed an interest in alternative treatments for schizophrenia.

Before conceiving Soteria, Mosher supervised a ward in a psychiatric hospital at Yale University as its assistant professor, prescribed neuroleptics and was not against them. But by 1968, the year Mosher received the position of director of the Center for Schizophrenia Studies at the NIMH, he became convinced that the benefits of neuroleptics were overhyped.

The house, known as Soteria, was opened in an area of San Jose, California, in April 1971. Mosher believed that the violent and controlling atmosphere of psychiatric hospitals and the over-use of drugs hindered recovery. Despite its success (it achieved superior results than the standard medical treatment with drugs), the Soteria Project closed in 1983 when, according to Loren Mosher and Robert Whitaker further funding was denied because of the politics of psychiatry that were increasingly controlled by the influence of pharmaceutical companies.

Mosher is said to have had a far more nuanced view of the use of drugs than has been generally thought, and did not reject drugs altogether but insisted they be used as a last resort and in far lower doses than usual in the United States.

After resigning from the NIMH (and sharing his thoughts about the current state of psychiatry in his resignation letter), he taught psychiatry at the Uniformed Services University of the Health Sciences in Bethesda and became the head of the public mental health system in Montgomery County, Maryland. In Washington, D.C., he started a crisis residential home called Crossing Place, the first of its kind in the United States. In Maryland, he started a crisis house in Rockville, McAuliffe House, based on Soteria principles.

During the Ritalin phenomenon of the 1990s, he was often featured as a dissenting view in scores of articles. He was the founder and first editor in chief of Schizophrenia Bulletin.

Mosher edited or co-authored some books, including Community Mental Health: A Practical Guide, and published more than 100 reviews and articles. He held professorships and ran mental health programmes on both the US coasts. Mosher also headed his own consulting company, Soteria Associates, providing research, forensic and mental health consultation and cooperated for years with numerous advocacy groups, including the psychiatric survivor group MindFreedom International. He wrote a preface to Peter Lehmann's book Coming off Psychiatric Drugs (2004).

In 1996, he left Washington for San Diego. He worked as a clinical professor of psychiatry for the University of California, San Diego School of Medicine.

He was married to, and later divorced, Irene Carleton Mosher.

At the time of his death, he was in Berlin for experimental cancer treatment.

Among survivors are his wife, Judy Schreiber, three children from the first marriage, a granddaughter, and two brothers.

== Mosher archive ==
His work is archived at Stanford University and can be accessed via their website. Anyone interested in further pursuing his work can arrange to have it brought to the Stanford Green Library.

== See also ==
- Soteria
- Schizophrenia Bulletin
- John Read (psychologist)

== Some research papers ==
- Mosher, Loren (March 1999). "Soteria and other alternatives to acute psychiatric hospitalization: a personal and professional review" (PDF). Journal of Nervous and Mental Disease. 187 (3): 142–149. doi:10.1097/00005053-199903000-00003. PMID 10086470. Archived from the original (PDF) on February 29, 2012.
- Mosher, Loren; Menn, Alma (November 1978). "Community Residential Treatment for Schizophrenia: Two-Year Follow-up". Hospital and Community Psychiatry. 29 (11): 715–723. doi:10.1176/ps.29.11.715. PMID 700610. S2CID 19296318.
- Mosher, Loren; Menn, Alma; Matthews, Susan (April 1975). "Soteria: Evaluation of a home-based treatment for schizophrenia". American Journal of Orthopsychiatry. 45 (3): 455–467. doi:10.1111/j.1939-0025.1975.tb02556.x. PMID 238399.
- Mosher, Loren; Keith, Samuel (1980). "Psychosocial treatment: Individual, group, family, and community support approaches". Schizophrenia Bulletin. 6 (1): 10–41. doi:10.1093/schbul/6.1.10. PMID 6102787.
- Gunderson, John; Mosher, Loren (September 1975). "The cost of schizophrenia". The American Journal of Psychiatry. 132 (9): 901–906. doi:10.1176/ajp.132.9.901. PMID 168788.
- Bola, John; Mosher, Loren (April 2003). "Treatment of Acute Psychosis Without Neuroleptics: Two-Year Outcomes From the Soteria Project". Journal of Nervous and Mental Disease. 191 (4): 219–229. doi:10.1097/01.nmd.0000061148.84257.f9. PMID 12695732. S2CID 1095393.
- Mosher, Loren; Pollin, William; Stabenau, James (May 1, 1971). "Identical Twins Discordant for Schizophrenia: Neurologic Findings". Archives of General Psychiatry. 24 (5): 422–430. doi:10.1001/archpsyc.1971.01750110034006. PMID 5581266.
- Mosher, Loren (December 1983). "Alternatives to psychiatric hospitalization: Why has research failed to be translated into practice?". The New England Journal of Medicine. 309 (25): 1579–1580. doi:10.1056/NEJM198312223092512. PMID 6419102.
- Mosher, Loren; Keith, Samuel (May 1979). "Research on the psychosocial treatment of schizophrenia: A summary report". The American Journal of Psychiatry. 136 (5): 623–631. doi:10.1176/ajp.136.5.623. PMID 219718.
- Mosher, Loren (February 1982). "Italy's revolutionary mental health law: an assessment". American Journal of Psychiatry. 139 (2): 199–203. doi:10.1176/ajp.139.2.199. PMID 7055290.
- Mosher, Loren (October 1983). "Recent developments in the care, treatment, and rehabilitation of the chronic mentally ill in Italy". Hospital and Community Psychiatry. 34 (10): 947–950. doi:10.1176/ps.34.10.947. PMID 6629349.
