= Cohen Veterans Network =

Philanthropic organization serving veterans

- Formation: 2015
- Type: Nonprofit organization
- Purpose: Veterans' mental health care
- Headquarters: Stamford, Connecticut
- Region served: United States
- Product: Mental health care
- Key people: Steven A. Cohen, founder; Dr. Anthony Hassan, Chief Executive Officer
- Website: www.cohenveteransnetwork.org

Cohen Veterans Network (CVN) is a US not-for-profit philanthropic organization that serves post-9/11 veterans and their families through a nationwide system of mental health clinics. CVN's headquarters are in Stamford, Connecticut, United States.

Cohen Veterans Network is the vision of philanthropist Steven A. Cohen, and was conceived after his son was deployed to Afghanistan from August, 2010 to February, 2011.

The organization's goal is to strengthen mental health outcomes and complement existing support with a particular focus on post-9/11 veterans. It aims to overcome barriers to care such as access to care and stigmas about mental health.

== History ==
From August 2010 to February 2011, Steven A. Cohen's son was deployed to Afghanistan. In 2011, Cohen became involved in veterans' mental health while serving on the board of the Robin Hood Foundation, a charitable organization focused on alleviating problems caused by poverty in New York City.

In 2013, the Steven & Alexandra Cohen Foundation Cohen's family foundation, began underwriting the Military Family Clinic at NYU Langone. That year, the foundation also gave the largest individual, single private gift in the nation to fund post-traumatic stress disorder research at NYU Langone.

In 2015, Cohen launched Cohen Veterans Bioscience to accelerate the research and development of biomarker tests and drug-based therapies for post-traumatic stress and traumatic brain injury.

In 2016, Cohen launched the Cohen Veterans Network with a pledge of $275 million to fund the project and announced the first four Military Family Clinic locations. In 2017, new clinics launched in Fayetteville, N.C., El Paso, TX with an additional clinic opening in Washington, D.C. The network had already helped more than 5,600 veterans and family members as of April 2018. New clinics in Denver, CO, Killeen, TX, and Clarksville, TN opened by the end of summer 2018. The Tacoma, WA location publicly opened in March 2019, at which point the network had served more than 10,000 veterans and family members. Clinics in Tampa, FL, Virginia Beach, VA and San Diego, CA will also open in 2019.

By 2024, the organization has grown to comprise 22 clinics in the U.S.

Cohen Veterans Network and the Department of Veteran's Affairs (VA) announced a partnership to increase veterans' access to mental health in 2018.

== Benefits and eligibility ==
CVN provides services for all veterans who have served in the United States Armed Services, irrespective of role while in uniform, discharge status, or combat experience. This includes the National Guard and Reserves.

Veterans' families are also eligible for care at CVN clinics, including parents, siblings, spouses or partners, children, caretakers, and others, regardless of whether their military loved ones seek treatment. CVN also provides services for active-duty service members.

== Clinics ==
The first Steven A. Cohen Military Family Clinic was opened in the NYU Langone Medical Center. In April 2016, two additional clinics were launched in San Antonio, Texas, at Endeavors; and in Addison, Texas, at Metrocare. Today, the network has 22 Cohen Clinics across the country. Cohen Clinics have delivered care to over 82,000 clients across the country from April 2016 to March 2025. Since inception, the network has provided over 715,000 clinical sessions.
