= Luc Ciompi =

Swiss psychotherapist and psychiatrist

Luciano "Luc" Ciompi (born October 10, 1929, in Florence, Italy) is a Swiss psychiatrist. He was professor of psychiatry, medical director of the University Social Psychiatric Clinic and co-director of the Department of Psychiatry of the University of Berne/Switzerland from 1977 to 1994. He is the founder of the concept of Affect-logics, an interdisciplinary theory of the rules of interaction between emotion and cognition, and the founder of Soteria Berne, (s. below) He also proposed a conceptual framework towards an integrative, psycho-socio-biological understanding of mental illnesses, and promoted community-based halfway institutions for crisis intervention and social reintegration of the mentally ill.

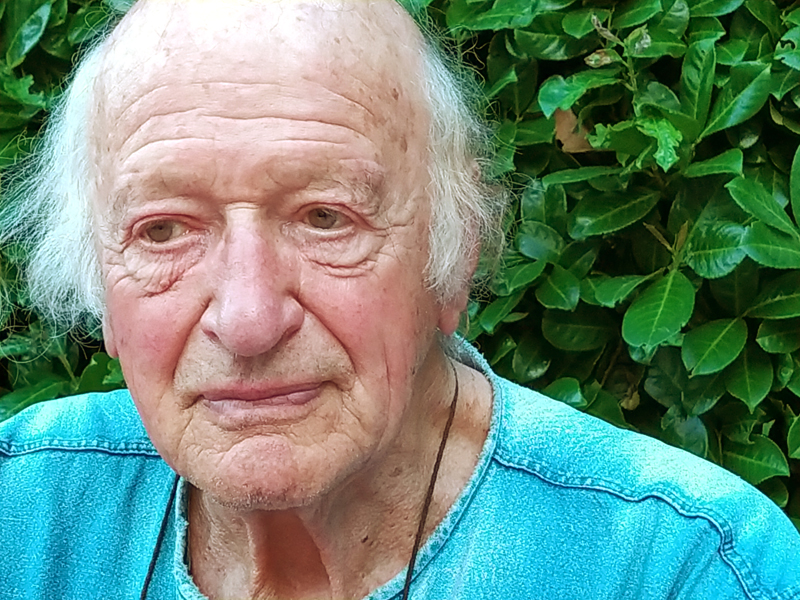
Luc Ciompi 2021

== Life and education ==
Luc Ciompi studied medicine in Berne, Geneva and Paris from 1951 to 1956. He then specialized in psychiatry and psychotherapy (1957–1963), first training in psychoanalysis, then later also in systemic family therapy (1959–1970).

Between 1963 and 1973 he led the so-called Enquête de Lausanne at the Lausanne University Psychiatric Hospital, an extensive research program on the long-term course of various mental disorders into old age. In the 1970s, he established in Lausanne a network of so-called halfway institutions aimed at social reintegration of long-term psychiatric patients.

From 1977 to 1994, he directed the Social Psychiatric University Hospital in Berne, where he again set up a network of halfway institutions, and created the residential therapeutic community Soteria Berne (1984), an alternative institution for a mainly psychotherapeutic and sociotherapeutic treatment of acute schizophrenic psychoses.

After his retirement in 1994, he spent one and a half years as guest professor at the Konrad Lorenz Institute in Altenberg near Vienna, studying the evolutionary roots of emotion and cognition. Subsequently, he has mainly been active as a book author, lecturer, psychotherapist and supervisor.

Ciompi has been married since 1959 and has two sons and three grandchildren. He lives in Belmont-sur-Lausanne, Switzerland.

== Work ==
His first major research program, the Enquête de Lausanne focussed on the long-term evolution of all kinds of mental diseases over several decades, until old age. He studied an initial sample of some 5000 former patients, combining his data with mortality studies in order to identify biases in his sample.

His main findings were that, contrary to common beliefs, in about a quarter of the cases, schizophrenic disorders disappear altogether in the long run, and improve considerably in another roughly a quarter to a third of cases. Several other mental illnesses also displayed a tendency to attenuation in old age.

Ciompi is also one of the proponents of the vulnerability-stress model of schizophrenia, which may explain the great variability of symptomatology and of long-term evolutions of the illness.

In his studies on rehabilitation, Ciompi and his collaborators found that social and professional reintegration of long-term mental patients depends more on the expectations of their environment (family, psychiatrists, nurses etc.) than on a number of general, psychopathologic and social variables.

Since the 1980s, Ciompi has also been developing the above-mentioned concept of affect-logics, an interdisciplinary synthesis of neurobiological, psychological psychoanalytical, sociological and evolution-theoretical notions aimed at understanding the interactions between cognition and emotion.

Based on the affect-logics approach, he eventually proposed a partly new understanding of the psyche and of psychotic disorders, in which both linear and non-linear emotional dynamics and critically increasing emotional tensions play a key role.

Eight testable working hypotheses on affective-cognitive interactions were elaborated in a joint paper with the American neurobiologist Jaak Panksepp. These concepts have also been supported by a computer-simulation of basic affective-cognitive interactions.

A practical application of these principles is the therapeutic community Soteria Berne, founded in 1984 and functioning for almost four decades, entirely focused on a sustained reduction of emotional tensions in and around the psychotic patient.

In a recent theoretical publication, Ciompi and Tschacher also link the concept of affect-logics with the concepts of synergetics, of embodiment, as well as with Karl J. Friston's principle of minimization of free energy.

In later publications, Ciompi dealt also with more general problems such as the experience of time, the social effects of collective emotions, and the question of mind and consciousness, postulating that emotions play an important role in the evolutionary emergence of consciousness.

== Publications ==
Luc Ciompi is the author (partly with collaborators) of a large number of scientific publications, mostly in German, including 16 books, numerous book chapters and some 200 articles, in particular on the long-term course of schizophrenia, the concept of affect-logics, the emotional foundations of thinking.

== Awards ==
Ciompi has been granted a number of honours and scientific awards, among them the Stanley R. Dean Research Award of the American College of Psychiatrists (1986), a title of Doctor Honoris Causa of the University of Lausanne (2008), and the Dr. Margrit Egnér-Award for special anthropologic and humanistic achievements (2015).
