= Supportive housing =

Combination of housing and services

Supportive housing is a combination of housing and services intended as a cost-effective way to help people live more stable, productive lives, and is an active "community services and funding" stream across the United States. It was developed by different professional academics and US governmental departments that supported housing. Supportive housing is widely believed to work well for those who face the most complex challenges—individuals and families confronted with homelessness and who also have very low incomes or serious, persistent issues that may include substance use disorders (including alcoholism), mental health, HIV/AIDS, chronic illness, diverse disabilities (e.g., intellectual disabilities, mobility or sensory impairments) or other serious challenges to stable housing.

== Supportive housing in rehabilitation ==
Supportive housing can be coupled with such social services as job training, life skills training, alcohol and substance use disorder treatment, community support services (e.g., child care, educational programs, coffee klatches), and case management to populations in need of assistance. Supportive housing is intended to be a pragmatic solution that helps people have better lives while reducing, to the extent feasible, the overall cost of care. As community housing, supportive housing can be developed as mixed income, scattered site housing not only through the traditional route of low income and building complexes.

Supportive housing has been widely researched in the field of psychiatric disabilities and psychiatric rehabilitation, based in part on housing and support principles from studies of leading community integration organizations nationally. In addition, supportive housing has been tied to national initiatives in supportive living (usually developmental and intellectual disabilities) to cross-disability transfer and to national and international efforts on developing homes of one's own. Supported housing in the field of mental health is considered to be a critical component of a community support system which may involve supported education, supported or transitional employment, case management services, clubhouses, supported recreation and involvement of family and friends often translated into psycho-educational programs.

From 2002 to 2007, an estimated 65,000 to 72,000 units of supportive housing were created in the United States. This represents about half the supply of supported housing units. Of the new units added, about half were targeted towards chronically homeless individuals, and one-fifth were for homeless families. According to the United States Department of Housing and Urban Development (HUD), the number of Permanent Supportive Housing beds in the US increased from 188,636 to 353,800 between 2007 and 2017. Although of the shelter population, the majority remain as single, adult males of minority groups (approximately 65%), 38% were between 31 and 50 years old, and 38% had a disability; the rest were homeless families with a high concentration (likely due to high housing costs) in the states of California, New York and Florida.

== Populations served ==
Sponsors of supportive housing projects generally aim to serve a specific population; the characteristics of those served and the housing program range widely: However, supporters of regular housing and support services in the community suggest choice based on other personal, social, and situational factors than specific population basis (e.g., choice of roommates or housemates, neighborhoods they live in).

Today, important new populations for supported housing in regular neighborhoods include working families, especially those with high proportional housing costs, older adults who need intensive (enriched) services to avoid nursing home placements, and people who need places to live due to the closure of the old style, institutional psychiatric care. Increasingly, supportive housing may be required as unemployment increases, for newly emerging groups such as newly legalized gay and lesbian partners, multi-generational immigrant groups in the new multicultural world, and for those adolescents aging out of their parents' homes to new community options. One of the 2000s textbooks on Supported/supportive Housing is a report on state projects in the US for older adults which includes use of the home and community-based (HCBS) waiver, efforts to reform more than 43 congregate residential categories in states, use of housing subsidies for low income persons, assisted living options, "comprehensive case/care management", and technical area such as "at-risk" housing and non-profit development.

== Benefits of supportive housing for specific populations groups ==
Supportive housing proposes to be a comprehensive solution to a problem rather than a band-aid fix (such as a shelter). While many of those who stay in the shelter system remain in or return to the system for extended periods of time, a much higher percentage of those who are placed in supportive housing remain housed on a more permanent basis. This idea is also referred to as the Housing First model, an approach to combating chronic homelessness by providing homes upfront and offering help for illnesses and addictions. The concept turns the traditional model, which typically requires sobriety (or prerequisites that can be used for enhanced services before a person can get housing), upside down.

Research has shown that coupling permanent housing with supportive services is highly effective at maintaining housing stability, as well as helps improve health outcomes and decreases the use of publicly funded institutions. A review of the impact of these services found that they can improve health outcomes among chronically homeless individuals, including positive changes in self-reported mental health status, substance use, and overall well-being. In the Collaborative Initiative to Help End Chronic Homelessness (CICH), participants who had been homeless for an average of eight years were immediately placed into permanent housing. The CICH evaluation reported that 95% of those individuals were in independent housing after 12 months. A study of homeless people in New York City with serious mental illness found that providing supportive housing to the individuals directly resulted in a 60% decrease in emergency shelter use for clients, as well as decreases in the use of public medical and mental health services and city jails and state prisons. Another study in Seattle in 2009 found that moving "people with chronic alcoholism" into supportive housing resulted in a 33% decline in alcohol use for clients.

There is significant support for the contention that supportive housing also costs less than other systems where its tenant base may reside, such as jails, hospitals, mental health facilities, and even shelters. Research on the overall costs to the taxpayer of supportive housing has consistently found the costs to the taxpayer to be about the same or lower than the alternative of a chronically homeless person sleeping in a shelter. The CICH evaluation showed that average costs for healthcare and treatment were reduced by about half, which the largest decline associated with inpatient hospital care. The use of supportive housing has been shown to be cost-effective, resulting in reductions in the use of shelter, ambulance, police/jail, health care, emergency room, behavior health, and other service costs. For example, one 2016 report identified studies documenting that these services can reduce health care costs, emergency department visits, and length of stays in psychiatric hospitals. The Denver Housing First Collaborative documented that the annual cost of supportive housing for a chronically homeless individual was $13,400. However, the per-person reduction in public services recorded by the Denver Housing First Collaborative came to $15,773 per person per year, more than compensating for the annual supportive housing costs.

When paired with low-income housing (or mixed-income housing), government subsidies (such as section 8 or Housing choice vouchers) and other revenue generating operations, supportive housing residences are claimed by their supporters to be capable of supporting themselves and even turning a profit (which can be used for enhanced services and amenities for the residents by a non-profit organization). According to a 2007 study done by the National Alliance to End Homelessness, supportive housing helps tenants increase their incomes, work more, get arrested less, make more progress toward recovery, and become more active, valued and productive members of their communities.

== Impact on neighborhoods ==
Supportive housing can help people facing health challenges to continue to live in the community. However, proposals for new housing projects often faced local opposition, largely based on fears regarding adverse effects on property values and crime rates, local businesses, and the quality of life in the surrounding neighborhood. A 2008 study in Toronto, Canada reported:

- There is no evidence linking supportive housing to property values and crime rates
- Supportive housing tenants contribute to local businesses
- Neighbors do not think the supportive housing buildings have a negative impact
- Positive contributions of supportive housing tenants to the community

One of the benefits of supportive housing which is integrated into the community is that local opposition and fears are minimized. Neighborhoods have been studied as part of the development of community support, and as places for the development of personal connections and neighborhood relations. In addition, a capacity-based approach to neighborhood development can be made integral to the development of supportive housing, including aspects of neighborhood asset building. In many ways, these projects can restore neighborhood-based control of services' planning. Examples include new housing developments, after-school programs, parent support groups, respite care and similar initiatives in the field of children's mental health.

== Limitations, impediments and challenges affecting the development of Supportive Housing ==
=== Financial feasibility ===
Some projects fail to materialize because of a real or perceived lack of government program funds, charitable grants, bank loans or a combination of such funding to pay for the cost of creating and operating financially viable supportive housing. Other organizations, however, have accessed diverse mix and match funding for highly visible community demonstrations for special population groups.

Early directions for financing of housing and support services in the community included financing sources, such as housing cooperative programs, mixed income housing associations, community development block grants, loans for accessibility programs, tax exempt bonds, trust funds, housing subsidies, and low interest loans. The housing communities and institutes in the US, as early as the early 1980s, included Institute for Community Economics, McAuley Institute, Women's Institute for Housing and Economic Development, Habitat for Humanity, the Housing Technical Assistance Project of the ARCs, Local Support Corporation (LISC), University of Vermont (Center for Community Change through Housing and Support), Creative Management Associates, Enterprise Foundation, and National Housing Coalition.

The US Department of Housing and Urban Development regularly makes available free information on housing financing and developments in the US through their website, including "Research Works" (in 2011, also on sustainability and green initiatives) and "US Housing Market Conditions". Specific technical resources are available to providers and researchers such as on Section 8 or housing vouchers (portable vouchers).

=== Government policies and plans ===
Where traditional solutions—institutions, charitable organizations or other methods—are recognized as inadequate solutions for the situation, national, regional and local officials have come to believe that homelessness is a problem that can and should be solved by other means. In some areas, this produced a movement to find alternative solutions rather than continuing to fund the traditional solutions, including shelter system, jails, asylums and hospitals. In addition to homelessness, the movement today is to downsize or close psychiatric centers (e.g., Olmstead initiative).

In the US, hundreds of city governments have produced "10-year plans" that provide for supportive housing to end chronic homelessness because the Bush administration began pushing for creation of the plans in 2003. The goal: put the homeless people with complex situations and needs into permanent or transitional "supportive" housing with counseling services that help them get healthy lifestyles of their own choosing. The evidence shows supportive housing may be a viable solution: the number of street people in cities across the United States has plummeted for the first time since the 1980s. In 2005–2006, Miami, Florida reported a 20% decline in homeless populations and dozens of other US cities reported similar census results: San Francisco, CA (30%), Portland, OR (20%), Dallas, TX (28%), New York, NY (13%).

Guided by research, Congress has taken several steps to encourage the development of permanent supportive housing. Beginning in the late 1990s, appropriations bills have increased funding for the United States Department of Housing and Urban Development's homeless assistance programs and targeted at least 30 percent of funding to permanent supportive housing. Congress has also provided funding to ensure that permanent supportive housing funded by one of the United States Department of Housing and Urban Development programs (Shelter Plus Care) would be renewed non-competitively, helping to ensure that chronically homeless people could remain in their housing. The 2009 legislative mandate from the Homeless Emergency Assistance and Rapid Transition to Housing (HEARTH) Act created bipartisan political support to adopt a collaborative approach to end homelessness. From this effort spawned the United States Interagency Council on Homelessness's Opening Doors Strategic Plan to Prevent and End Homelessness in 2010. With a focus on permanent supportive housing as a means of ending chronic homelessness, the plan outlines an interagency effort aligning mainstream housing, health, education, and human services.

=== Lack of expertise in development and operations ===
One impediment to the development of additional housing stock where it is otherwise needed, permissible and feasible is the lack of real estate acquisition, development & financing expertise in the government agencies and non-profit (non-governmental) organizations interested in serving those who need and want supportive housing. The United States Department of Housing and Urban Development is trying to bridge that information and knowledge gap with the availability of regular reports on market and housing conditions throughout the nation, and statistics on all kinds of housing developments (e.g., home ownership, multifamily structures).

In addition, there is a widening affordability gap in housing, especially with the lowest income households. Experts point to several factors contributing to this gap: erosion in the housing stock, high housing prices, a drop in real wages, a decline in middle wage jobs, increases in transportation costs, expensive development requirements, regulatory constraints, and insufficient housing assistance funds to meet the needs.

== Economic impact on society ==
Studies cited by supporters (who represent the advocacy and provider sectors listed below) conclude that supportive housing is a cost-effective solution for the problems of several populations; it is substantially less costly than most alternatives used to address the problems of homeless people, including shelters, institutions and hospitals. Current arguments are that supportive housing often reduces the cost of emergency services for health care provided by governmental and non-profit agencies. The chronically homeless, the 10-20% who are continually on the street with addiction and mental problems impose heavy costs on their communities in hospital, jail and other services—hundreds of thousands of dollars apiece annually in some instances.

- For example, the average daily cost to house a person in various institutional settings in New York City (2004)
  - Supportive housing $41.85
  - Shelter $54.42
  - Prison $74.00
  - Jail $164.57
  - Psychiatric hospital $467
  - Hospital $1185

Per a study published in JAMA in 2009, a supportive housing development called 1811 Eastlake saved taxpayers $4 million in the first year of operation alone, because these residents are now off the streets and out of emergency rooms and in a safe, steady and supportive living environment. The 1811 Eastlake study compared 95 Housing First participants, with 39 wait-list control members and found cost reductions of over 50 percent for the Housing First group. While it is not the first published evidence of the service use reductions and cost savings that permanent supportive housing interventions can provide, it is worth highlighting because the level of the cost savings – almost $30,000 per person per year after accounting for housing program costs – are greater than some seminal studies that have shown more modest cost offsets through permanent supportive housing. 1811 Eastlake provided assistance to homeless people with extensive health issues and still saw a savings of nearly $30,000 per tenant per year in publicly funded services, all while achieving improved housing and health outcomes.

However, supportive housing, especially as assisted living, may be congregate in nature either related to hospital and nursing home systems reform on one hand (e.g., Pynoos et al., 2004), or in psychiatric, to its categorical disability service system with roots in community services systems and psychiatric hospitals. In the field of intellectual disabilities, the term supportive living is more common with decongregated, small size homes and apartments with choice options throughout local communities.

== From supported housing to housing and support ==
The US has experienced an effort to move from facility-based services to more of a housing and support approach in regular homes in typical neighborhoods. This movement, involving state-federal and university collaboration, has involved the development of principles of housing and support which could apply across different disability groups interested in moving from the facility-based (bundled program) approach to housing and support. These principles are:

- Housing for all.
- Integrated housing.
- Choice.
- Supports based on the individual.
- Separation of housing and support. Supported housing, in particular, involves moving from traditional residential models in mental health community services (e.g., halfway houses and group homes, transitional residences/apartment programs, Fairweather Lodges) to the newer community support approaches which allow greater choice and flexibility in roommates, homes, and neighborhoods. In particular, this period supported consumer housing preferences to form the basis for better quality housing and recognition of consumer choice. However, the primary concern remained the requirements of residential providers (no zero reject policy, this field), especially when addictions were identified as the primary concern for a few people/residents.

Supportive housing, in addition to quality assurance procedures, are meant to ensure quality of care and quality of life; Sheehan and Oakes (2004) indicate that residents may be reluctant to complain on satisfaction surveys since they may be relocated to even stricter nursing facilities. However, these projects have included Real Systems Change Grants to enhance opportunities for independent living for people with disabilities and to assist 3 communities (in Connecticut) to become models of inclusion of people with disabilities and to transition from the nursing facilities. Supported housing (which is the first community living to involve housing, though NGO purchasing and leasing of community homes preceded this development) now is in its 4th decade in the university-governmental and community sectors, and was also succeeded by models of housing and health from the traditional medical sectors.

== Supportive housing providers ==
The United States Department of Housing and Urban Development supports plans for the development or redevelopment of communities ("planned communities", US Congress) in 2019 and the development of "large scale housing and mixed use developments" (e.g., mixed income housing projects such as through the Madison Mutual Housing Association and Cooperatives; housing-business-transportation-recreation-schools projects), including on Indian reservations and land in the US.

== Supported/supportive housing governmental assistance ==
- US Department of Housing and Urban Development – USA
- Crisis – UK
- Supportive housing program, Winnipeg, Manitoba, Canada
- Supported housing, state of New York
- Keeping Families Together, New York

== See also ==
- Permanent Supportive Housing for Homeless People — Reframing the Debate
- Impact of a New York City supportive housing program on Medicaid expenditure patterns among people with serious mental illness and chronic homelessness
- Permanent Supportive Housing: Addressing Homelessness and Health Disparities?
- Addressing Chronic Disease Within Supportive Housing Programs
- Detroit’s focus on supportive housing drives down homelessness 15 percent
