= Steve Cohen (businessman) =

American businessman (born 1956)

Steven Cohen
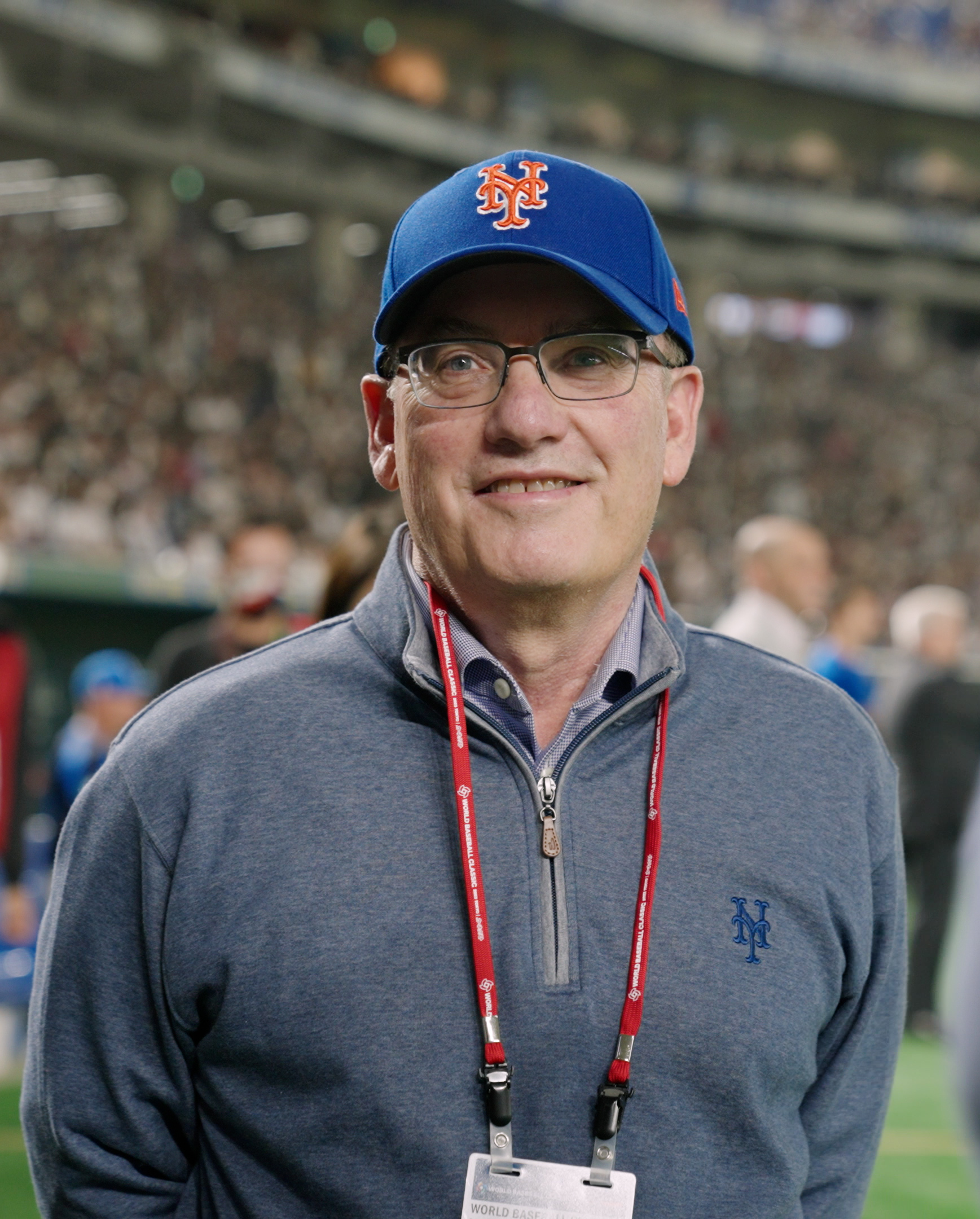
- Cohen at a New York Mets game in 2023
- Born: June 11, 1956 (age 70); Great Neck, New York, U.S.
- Education: University of Pennsylvania (BS)
- Known for: Record insider trading fine of $1.8 billion
- Title: Founder, S.A.C. Capital Advisors & Point72 Asset Management; Owner, New York Mets
- Spouses: Patricia Finke (m. 1979; div. 1990); Alexandra Garcia (m. 1992)

Steven A. Cohen (born June 11, 1956) is an American hedge fund manager and owner of the New York Mets of Major League Baseball (MLB). He is the founder of Point72 Asset Management and S.A.C. Capital Advisors. In 2013, S.A.C. Capital Advisors pleaded guilty to wire and securities fraud to insider trading and paid $1.8 billion in fines. In 2020, Cohen acquired the Mets from Fred Wilpon for $2.4 billion.

== Early life and education ==
Cohen was born on June 11, 1956, and raised in Great Neck, New York, where his father worked as a dress manufacturer in Manhattan's garment district and his mother was a piano teacher. He grew up in a Jewish family.

The third of eight children, Cohen developed an interest in poker during high school, often wagering his own money in tournaments. Cohen often enjoyed playing with his friends and has credited the game with teaching him "how to take risks." He graduated from John L. Miller Great Neck North High School in 1974, where he played on the soccer team.

Cohen received an economics degree from the Wharton School of the University of Pennsylvania in 1978. While at Penn, he joined the Zeta Beta Tau fraternity's Theta chapter, where he served as treasurer. A friend helped him open a brokerage account using $1,000 of his tuition money, which marked his entry into financial markets.

== Investment career ==
=== Gruntal & Co. (1978–1992) ===
In 1978, after graduating from Penn, Cohen got a Wall Street job as a junior trader in the options arbitrage department at Gruntal & Co. On his first day on the job at Gruntal & Co., he made an $8,000 profit. He eventually would go on to make the company around $100,000 a day and eventually managed a $75 million portfolio and six traders. Cohen was running his trading group at Gruntal & Co. by 1984 and continued running it until he started his own company, SAC Capital, in 1992.

In the late 1980s, the SEC became suspicious that Cohen had used inside information in December 1985 when he bet that RCA and GE would merge ahead of the announcement. The SEC called him to testify but he refused to answer any questions, invoking his right against self-incrimination. The SEC then started looking into his other investments from the same period. However, Cohen was not charged with insider trading.

=== S.A.C. Capital Advisors (1992–2016) ===
In 1992, Cohen started S.A.C. Capital Advisors with $10 million of his own money and another $10 million from outside capital. The company's name is derived from his initials.

In 2003, the New York Times wrote that "SAC is one of the biggest hedge funds and is known for frequent and rapid trading." In 2006, The Wall Street Journal reported that while Cohen was once a rapid-fire trader who never held trading positions for extended periods, he now held an increasing number of equities for longer periods.

As of 2009, the firm managed $14 billion in equity.

=== Racketeering and insider trading allegations ===
In December 2009, Cohen and his brother Donald T. Cohen were sued by Steven's ex-wife Patricia Cohen for racketeering and insider trading. On March 30, 2011, the United States District Court in Manhattan dismissed the case, but on April 3, 2013, the 2nd U.S. Circuit Court of Appeals ruled that the lower court had erred in dismissing fraud-based claims by his former spouse and revived the lawsuit. The appeals court also revived claims of racketeering and breach of fiduciary duty while upholding the dismissal of an unjust-enrichment claim.

Writing for a three-judge panel, Circuit Judge Pierre N. Leval said that Patricia Cohen had made a "plausible" allegation that Steven Cohen had concealed the $5.5 million during negotiations on a separation agreement in 1989, which preceded the divorce. The revival of the lawsuit came amid mounting pressure on Steven Cohen over an insider-trading investigation that led to the arrest of Michael Steinberg, one of Cohen's closest confidantes at SAC Capital. SAC affiliates reached two civil insider trading settlements totaling nearly $616 million with the Securities and Exchange Commission. SAC neither admitted nor denied wrongdoing in either case.

=== SEC investigation (2012–2016) ===
In November 2012, Cohen was implicated in an alleged insider trading scandal involving an ex-SAC manager, Mathew Martoma. The SEC brought charges against many other SAC employees from 2010 to 2013 with various outcomes. Martoma was convicted in 2014, in what federal prosecutors billed as the most profitable insider-trading conspiracy in history. The SEC later brought a civil lawsuit against Cohen, alleging his failure to supervise Martoma and Michael Steinberg, who was a senior employee and confidant of Cohen's. Cohen settled his civil case with regulators in January 2016; the agreement with the SEC prohibited Cohen from managing outside money until 2018.

S.A.C. Capital Advisors pleaded guilty to insider trading charges in 2013 and paid $1.8 billion in penalties and was required to stop handling investments for outsiders. Cohen avoided criminal indictment himself. He was featured in January 2017 The New Yorker article titled "When the Feds Went After the Hedge-Fund Legend Steven A. Cohen".

=== Point72 Asset Management (2014–present) ===
In 2014, Cohen founded Point72 Asset Management as a family office. In 2018, Cohen's firm commenced operations as a registered investment advisor and began managing assets for external investors. As of 2026, Point72 has $45.7 billion in assets under management, placing it among the world's largest multi-strategy hedge funds alongside Citadel and Millennium Management. In October 2024, Point72 launched Turion, a fund dedicated to artificial intelligence investments, run by portfolio manager Eric Sanchez. Cohen is one of the fund's investors. The fund posted a 14% gain within months of launch and was expected to grow to $1.5 billion in assets.

=== GameStop short squeeze ===
In January 2021, Cohen's hedge fund Point72 joined Ken Griffin's Citadel in putting $2.75 billion into Melvin Capital, the hedge fund of former Cohen protege Gabe Plotkin, as a result of the GameStop short squeeze. Cohen denied that his involvement with the short squeeze would affect his willingness to spend money on the New York Mets. Cohen deactivated his Twitter account on January 29, 2021, due to an influx of threats against him and his family.

== Wealth ==
In 2024, Forbes estimated Cohen's net worth at $21.3 billion, ranking him the 30th richest person in the United States.

Cohen was dubbed "the hedge fund king" in a 2006 Wall Street Journal article. His 2005 compensation was reportedly $1 billion, considerably higher than his 2001 compensation of $428 million. In February 2015, Forbes listed Cohen as the highest-earning hedge-fund manager in 2014. In December 2013, Cohen's New York penthouse in the Bloomberg Tower was listed with an initial sale price of $115 million. According to Institutional Investor, Cohen made an estimated $1.7 billion in 2020. In 2025, Cohen earned an estimated $3.4 billion, topping Bloomberg's annual ranking of the world's highest-paid hedge fund managers for the first time, surpassing longtime rival Ken Griffin of Citadel. Point72's flagship fund returned approximately 17.5% in 2025, its fourth consecutive year of double-digit gains.

== New York Mets ==
Cohen became a minority owner of the New York Mets of Major League Baseball (MLB) in 2012, with an 8% stake in the club. In August 2020, Cohen had entered negotiations with Fred Wilpon and Saul Katz to buy a controlling interest in the team before reaching an agreement the following month. MLB approved the sale in October 2020, allowing Cohen to take control in November.

In 2021, the Mets struggled heavily. Cohen fired Brodie Van Wagenen when he took over and Jared Porter for harassment of a female reporter. In addition, underperformance from several players he acquired led the Mets to a historic collapse. The Mets were in first place for the longest of any team that finished with a losing record in MLB history, and the team finished with a 77–85 record. In 2022, with the highest payroll in baseball, the team performed better, finishing with a 101–61 record and making the playoffs. However, the Mets blew a 10 1/2-game division lead to the Atlanta Braves, settling for second place. The Mets then lost the 2022 National League Wild Card Series in three games to the San Diego Padres, sealing another historic collapse. In 2023, despite Cohen putting $331 million into the payroll, the team went 7–19 in June and ultimately missed the playoffs, with a 75–87 record.

The 2024 season marked a dramatic turnaround. After a 22–33 start, the team held a players-only meeting led by shortstop Francisco Lindor that proved pivotal. The Mets went 67–40 the rest of the way, clinching a playoff spot on the final day of the regular season. They knocked out the Milwaukee Brewers in the Wild Card round and upset the Philadelphia Phillies in the Division Series before falling to the Los Angeles Dodgers in the NLCS four games to two. It was the Mets' first NLCS appearance since 2015 and widely regarded as one of the most memorable seasons in franchise history.

In the 2025 season, Cohen signed outfielder Juan Soto to a record 15-year, $765 million contract and assembled a $340 million payroll - the highest in baseball. Despite this, the team squandered the best record in the majors at the midseason mark, going 38–55 over the final 93 games and missing the playoffs on the last day of the season after losing a tiebreaker to the Cincinnati Reds. Cohen took to social media afterward: "Mets fans everywhere. I owe you an apology. You did your part by showing up and supporting the team. We didn't do our part."

== Philanthropy ==
Since starting in 2001, the Steven & Alexandra Cohen Foundation has granted $1.5 billion to projects involved in health, education, arts and culture, and the New York community.

=== Veterans ===
- In April 2016, Cohen announced the creation and a commitment of $275 million to the Cohen Veterans Network. The CVN's goal is to establish mental-health centers for veterans and their families throughout the United States. The goal was the establishment of 20 to 25 centers by 2020.

Cohen Veterans Bioscience, also funded by Cohen, conducts research into the effects of posttraumatic stress disorder on combat veterans.

=== Medical ===
- In 2008, the Cohen Foundation gave a $50 million gift to expand and improve emergency care at Morgan Stanley Children's Hospital at NewYork-Presbyterian / Columbia. The Cohen Children's Emergency Department opened in June 2011.
- In January 2016, the Cohen Foundation gave $75 million to establish the Alexandra Cohen Hospital for Women and Newborns at NewYork-Presbyterian / Weill Cornell.
- NYP announced a $35 million gift to address the youth mental health crisis arising from the COVID-19 pandemic in July 2023.
- In 2014, the Cohen Foundation provided funding, via the New York University Langone Center, for the study of post-traumatic stress and traumatic brain injury.

=== Education ===
- In 2024, the foundation gave a $116 million gift to LaGuardia Community College, which became the largest donation of any US community college.

=== Arts ===
- In 2019, the foundation contributed $50 million of the more than $400 million raised for the New York's Museum of Modern Art (MoMA). The museum announced in 2017 that MoMA's largest contiguous gallery will be called the Steven and Alexandra Cohen Center for Special Exhibitions. Cohen is on the board of the MoMa and LA MOCA.
- The foundation gave a grant in excess of $100,000 to the Bruce Museum of Arts and Science in 2014.

Cohen serves on the board of trustees of the New York-based Robin Hood Foundation.

== Politics ==
In 2015, Cohen and his wife, Alexandra, donated $2.25 million to a Super PAC called America Leads that supported Chris Christie's presidential candidacy.

In 2017, Cohen contributed $1 million to Donald Trump's inauguration.

In 2021, Cohen donated $500,000 to a Super PAC supporting Andrew Yang's candidacy in the 2021 New York City Democratic mayoral primary, and a further $1.5 million to a Super PAC supporting Eric Adams.

== Art collection ==
Cohen's art collection is reported to be worth around $1 billion.

The New York Times reported that Cohen began seriously collecting art in 2000. Cohen's tastes and collection began with Impressionist painters, acquiring works by Manet and Monet, after which he moved quickly into contemporary art.

While he has collected works from important emerging artists such as Adam Pendleton, he is most famous for collecting 'trophy' art, signature works by famous artists, including a Jackson Pollock drip painting purchased from David Geffen for $52 million and Damien Hirst's The Physical Impossibility of Death in the Mind of Someone Living, a piece that the artist had bought back from Charles Saatchi for $8 million.

In 2006, Cohen attempted to make the most expensive art purchase in history when he offered to purchase Picasso's Le Rêve from casino mogul Steve Wynn for $139 million. Just days before the painting was to be transported to Cohen, Wynn, who suffers from poor vision due to retinitis pigmentosa, accidentally thrust his elbow through the painting while showing it to a group of acquaintances inside of his office at Wynn Las Vegas. The purchase was canceled, and Wynn kept the painting until early November 2012, when Cohen acquired the painting for $150 million.

In May 2019, Cohen bought Jeff Koons's Rabbit for $91.1 million; the purchase was made through Robert Mnuchin and was the most expensive work sold by a living artist at auction at the time.

Cohen owns or has owned artworks by Lucio Fontana, Alberto Giacometti, Willem de Kooning, Jeff Koons, Edvard Munch, Pablo Picasso, and Andy Warhol. In 2015, he reportedly bought the world's most expensive sculpture, Alberto Giacometti's Man Pointing. In November 2015, his art collection was estimated to be at about $1 billion. Cohen is reportedly building a private museum for some of his artwork on his Greenwich property. Cohen had also placed Marc Quinn's Self, a head sculpture made of frozen blood, in the SAC lobby.

== Legacy and awards ==
In 2008, he was inducted into the Institutional Investors Alpha's Hedge Fund Manager Hall of Fame along with Alfred Jones, Bruce Kovner, David Swensen, George Soros, Jack Nash, James Simons, Julian Robertson, Kenneth Griffin, Leon Levy, Louis Bacon, Michael Steinhardt, Paul Tudor Jones and Seth Klarman.

== Personal life ==
Cohen has been married twice. In 1979, he married Patricia Finke, a New York native from a working-class background who grew up in the Washington Heights, Manhattan neighborhood of New York City. They divorced in 1990 and have two children together.

In 1991, through a dating service, Cohen met Alexandra "Alex" Garcia, a single mother of Puerto Rican descent. Garcia had also grown up in Washington Heights, moving there from her original home in the projects of Harlem. "She'd always wanted to marry a millionaire," a friend told BusinessWeek. She told reporters at New York Magazine that she thought Cohen was "the funniest person she'd ever met." Garcia, a longtime Mets fan, has taken an active role in the Mets since Cohen purchased the team, and is listed as an owner along with Cohen.

Garcia serves as the president of the Amazin' Mets Foundation, the team's associated charity. They have had four children together.

Cohen loosely inspired the character Bobby Axelrod, played by Damian Lewis, on the Showtime series Billions. He was portrayed by Vincent D'Onofrio in the 2023 film Dumb Money, a biographical comedy-drama covering the GameStop short squeeze. In 1998, Cohen purchased a 35,000-square-foot (3,300 m^{2}) home on 14 acres (57,000 m^{2}) in Greenwich, Connecticut. In 2021, Cohen purchased a 31,000-square-foot mansion in Palm Beach County, west of Delray Beach.

== See also ==
- To Catch a Trader – PBS Frontline documentary
- When Wall Street Writes Its Own Rules
- Burrough, Brian (May 24, 2011). "What's Eating Steve Cohen?". Vanity Fair.
- "An art shark on the trading floor". The First Post. October 23, 2006. Archived from the original on November 28, 2006.
- Steven Cohen Accused of Failing to Prevent Insider Trading
- "A New Prince of Wall Street Buys Up Art" – New York Times 2005 article profiling Cohen's art collection
- Steven Cohen's Past Re-emerges to Cast Doubt on His Updated Image
