= Soteria (psychiatric treatment) =

Alternative inpatient treatment of people in psychotic crises

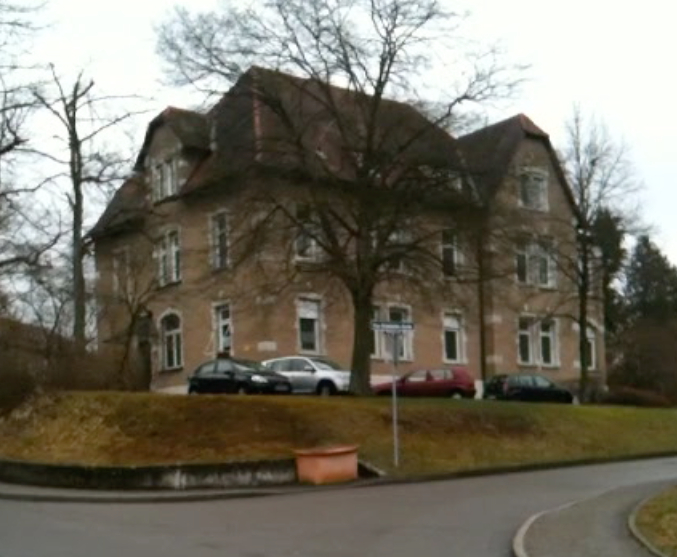
Soteria house, Zwiefalten, Germany (2011)

The Soteria model is a milieu-therapeutic approach developed to treat acute schizophrenia, usually implemented in Soteria houses.

Based on a recovery model, the common elements of the Soteria approach include the use of primarily nonmedical staff, who do not prescribe or administer antipsychotic medication to patients, and the preservation of residents' personal power, social networks, and communal responsibilities.

Soteria houses provide a community space for people experiencing mental distress or crisis and have no restraint facilities. Loren Mosher, founder of the first Soteria house, believed that people with schizophrenia did, in fact, recover from the illness without the use of neuroleptics in a supportive home-like environment.

Soteria houses are often seen as gentler alternatives to the psychiatric hospital system, which is perceived as authoritarian, hostile, or violent, and overly reliant on the use of psychiatric (particularly antipsychotic) drugs.

Some psychiatrists contest the Soteria model's validity due to a perception that it diverges from the controversial biopsychosocial model, as well as research quality concerns.

== Etymology and mythological origin ==
The term Soteria derives from the Ancient Greek word σωτηρία (sōtēria), meaning "deliverance," "preservation," or "salvation." In Greek mythology, Soteria was the personification of safety, protection, and deliverance from harm. She was associated with divine help and healing, and was closely linked to deities such as Zeus Sōtēr (Ζεύς Σωτήρ, "Zeus the Savior") and Asclepius, the god of medicine.

The name was chosen for the psychiatric treatment model "Soteria" to evoke the idea of a healing and protective environment that supports individuals in mental health crises without coercion or disempowerment.

== Theoretical model ==
Traditional psychiatric wards function according to the medical model, in which physicians have considerable authority, and in which they rely heavily upon medications to treat or cure what those physicians view as patients' mental illnesses. Critics of this model have pointed out that its reliance on labeling inevitably produces consequences, namely stigmatization and objectification.

Soteria emerged as a response to former psychiatric patients who said that they needed "love and food and understanding, not drugs", by providing an alternative centered on development, learning, and growth, and by comparing its results to those of the traditional model.

== History ==
The original Soteria Research Project was founded by psychiatrist Loren Mosher in San Jose, California, in 1971. A replication facility ("Emanon") opened in 1974 in another suburban San Francisco Bay Area city. Mosher was influenced by the philosophy of moral treatment, previous experimental therapeutic communities (such as the Fairweather Lodges), the work of Harry Stack Sullivan, and Freudian psychoanalysis.

Mosher's first Soteria house specifically selected unmarried patients between the ages of 18 and 30 who had recently been diagnosed with schizophrenia according to DSM-2 criteria. Staff members at the house were encouraged to treat residents as peers and to share household chores. The program was designed to create a quiet, calming environment that respected and tolerated individual differences and autonomy. There was also an ethos of shared responsibility in running the house and in playing a part in the mutually-supportive community, where the distinction between experts and non-experts was downplayed (similar to therapeutic communities). Though the model calls for no use of psychiatric medication, in practice, they were not completely rejected and were used in some circumstances. The Soteria staff, compared to staff in other psychiatric services, were found to possess significantly more intuition, introversion, flexibility, and tolerance of altered states of consciousness.

However, the Soteria Research Project was also the subject of much controversy. One of the main critiques was that the project was withholding evidence-based treatment as it was based on invalid anti-medication and anti-disease models, which went against the widely accepted biopsychosocial model of disease. Some also questioned the reported efficacy of the treatment, noting that Mosher's definition of patient recovery was staying off of drugs, with no assessment of their symptoms.

The US Soteria Project closed as a clinical program in 1983 due to lack of financial support, although it became the subject of research evaluation with competing claims and analysis. Second-generation US successors to the original Soteria house called Crossing Place are still active, although more focused on medication management.

Writing in 1999, Mosher described the core of Soteria as "the 24 hour a day application of interpersonal phenomenologic interventions by a nonprofessional staff, usually without neuroleptic drug treatment, in the context of a small, homelike, quiet, supportive, protective, and tolerant social environment." More recent adaptions sometimes employed professional staff. The Soteria approach has traditionally been applied to the treatment of those given a diagnosis of schizophrenia.

== Current implementations ==
Soteria-based houses are currently run in Sweden, Finland, Germany, Switzerland, Hungary, the United States (Note: Soteria-Alaska operated from 2008 until 2015 when it closed due to insufficient funding.)and Israel.

A first European near-replication of the original Soteria house was implemented in Bern, Switzerland, on May 1, 1984. However, the Bern approach differs from Mosher's original project in that it does not adopt the same anti-medical stance, using a consensual low-dose anti-psychotic treatment and including psychiatric staff.

The following criteria were required for patients to be admitted:

- Aged 17–35;
- A recent onset of schizophreniform or schizophrenic psychosis defined by using DSM-III-R criteria, not more than one year before admission;
- At least two of the following six symptoms within the previous four weeks: severely deviant social behaviors, schizophrenic disorders of affect, catatonia, thought disorders, hallucinations, delusions.

Research at Soteria Berne found that the majority of acute schizophrenia patients could be treated as successfully by this paradigm as by standard hospital proceedings, but with significantly lower doses of anti-psychotics and at similar daily costs. Some advantages of the Soteria model may be found at the subjective-emotional, familial, and social level.

In the context of increasing interest in the Soteria model in the United Kingdom, several European countries, North America, and Australasia, a review of controlled trials was conducted in order to evaluate the efficacy of the approach in the treatment of people diagnosed with schizophrenia. The results indicated that the Soteria paradigm yields similar – and in certain cases better – results than standard treatment. However, as noted by the authors, the review was based on a limited number of studies of questionable quality, and more research is needed in order to form a better consensus.

== See also ==
- Deinstitutionalization
- Therapeutic community
