= Keeping Families Together =

Keeping Families Together is a program of the Corporation for Supportive Housing (CSH) that aims to provide supportive housing to vulnerable families in order to enhance children’s safety and help prevent foster care placement. It brings together affordable housing with other social services and city agencies to help families with issues like substance abuse, medication management, parenting skills and career counseling.

== History ==
Keeping Families Together was launched in 2007 with a $700,000 grant from the Robert Wood Johnson Foundation (RWJF) to CSH. RWJF had been tracking several high-profile child welfare cases in the news, which revealed that children had died from abuse and neglect while living with families who experienced homelessness, behavioral health problems and involvement in the child welfare system.

With support from RWJF, CSH developed the Keeping Families Together pilot program, and secured 30 units of permanent housing in New York City. Between October 2007 and July 2009, 29 families participated in the pilot program. The pilot program paired supportive housing with on-site case management and family preservation services.

== Model ==
The Keeping Families Together model combines affordable housing with services to prevent foster care placement, stabilize at-risk families and improve family functioning. The model addresses the needs of the most vulnerable families that present the highest cost to society.

To be eligible for Keeping Families Together, families must have current child welfare involvement and must qualify as chronically homeless or at risk of becoming chronically homeless, in which the head of the household suffers from a substance abuse disorder, a disabling medical condition or HIV/AIDS.

With a goal of preventing crisis-driven child welfare interventions, the KFT model streamlines the resources of multiple city and state agencies to help families develop long-term service plans. Case managers work with families to identify their needs, such as substance abuse treatment, medication management, parenting skills training and domestic violence services.

== Evaluation ==
CSH and Metis Associates, a national consulting firm, evaluated the pilot program, which tracked 29 participating New York City families from October 2007 to July 2009. Before participating in the program, 62 percent of children born to pilot families had been in foster care at some point, and 19 percent had been in an informal placement out of home. The evaluation reported that as of June 2010, 26 of 29 families participating in the pilot remained in supportive housing. The program also resulted in the closure of 61.1 percent of the participating families’ child welfare cases. Also, almost half of the families had no further child welfare involvement at the end of the pilot.

Six children who had been removed from their families by children’s services were reunited by the end of the pilot. Five of these six children had been back with their families for more than 12 months after the program ended.

PR Newswire reported that before the Keeping Families Together pilot program, there were 101 cases of abuse or neglect, compared to 13 cases after involvement in the pilot program.
