= Fairweather Lodge =

The Fairweather Lodge Program is a psychosocial rehabilitation model in which residents live together and run or participate in a business that provides them with employment. As of 2006, there were over 90 Fairweather Lodges in 16 US states.

== History ==
The Fairweather Lodge Program was developed by psychologist George Fairweather in California in 1963. Fairweather found that patients with serious and persistent mental illness were less likely to require rehospitalization (i.e., "community tenure" is longer) when they lived and worked together in the community as a group, rather than individually.

== Lodge model ==
A “Fairweather Lodge” is a home that offers support for adults with mental illness. The Lodge setting is shared, independent housing and can be offered either short-term or long-term, depending on the needs and desires of the individual. Lodge members are active, productive men and women who share the responsibilities of household management and support each other in recovery. This interdependence relies on the skills and competencies of each individual and utilizes them to create a family style of living. By residing together, each member's potential standard of living can be greatly improved through companionship, shared expenses and mutual peer support. A Lodge managed by its members through group decision-making. While staff, provided by a sponsoring agency, may serve as advisors and be available in emergencies, on-site staffing is very limited. The Fairweather Lodge model also includes an employment component, with the understanding that participation in gainful employment supports mental health recovery. To provide employment, a Lodge may run a small business chosen by member consensus and jointly planned. Alternatively, the sponsoring agency may provide employment to Lodge residents through its own business initiatives.

== Program principles ==
1. The lodge must provide the residents a safe, healthy and caring environment that reinforces the recovery process.

2. The lodge must be a part of the overall plan for managing the residents' mental health symptoms and promoting good mental health.

3. The sponsor must provide services to the residents as long as they want and need them. The lodge must allow open entry and exit for the residents.

4. Residents with psychiatric disabilities can increase their community success and raise their social status through employment, through accumulating wealth and through direct consumerism.

5. Aside from their roles in the lodge business, residents need to have meaningful roles in the larger community.

6. A successful lodge resembles a family.

7. In order to progress, residents with psychiatric disabilities need autonomy that is commensurate with their abilities with the ultimate goal is full autonomy. The lodge must provide its residents with as much autonomy as possible.

8. The lodge must not depend on resources from any single entity, or on the philanthropy of its host community.

== Coalition for Community Living ==
The Coalition for Community Living (CCL) is a national organization that promotes the Fairweather Lodge model and monitors the lodge programs.

Each quarter, the CCL collects outcome data on each lodge to determine if it can be certified as a Fairweather Lodge. The outcome measures gauge adherence to the Faiweather principles and are designed to track meaningful quality of life indicators, such as safety and desirability of housing, access to quality mental health services, employment and earnings, healthy lifestyle and community belonging and personal autonomy.
