= S.A.C. Capital Advisors =

Group of hedge funds

SAC Capital Advisors, L.P.
- Type: Private
- Industry: Hedge fund
- Founded: 1992; 34 years ago
- Founder: Steven A. Cohen
- Defunct: 2016; 10 years ago
- Fate: Insider trading scandal
- Successor: Point72 Asset Management
- Headquarters: Stamford, Connecticut, U.S.
- AUM: US$16 billion (2008)
- Owner: Steven A. Cohen
- Number of employees: 800 (2010)

SAC Capital Advisors was a group of hedge funds founded by Steven A. Cohen in 1992. The firm employed approximately 800 people in 2010 across its offices located in Stamford, Connecticut, and New York City, and various offices. It reportedly lost many of its traders in the wake of various investigations by the Securities and Exchange Commission (SEC). In 2010, the SEC opened an insider trading investigation of SAC and in 2013 several former employees were indicted by the U.S. Department of Justice. In November 2013, the firm itself pleaded guilty to insider trading charges and paid $1.2 billion in penalties (in addition to $616 million already paid to the SEC). The firm shrank after returning the vast majority of its outside investor capital (i.e., not controlled by Steven Cohen personally). Point72 Asset Management was established as a separate family office in 2014, and SAC ceased to exist as a separate entity in 2016.

== History ==
The company's name 'SAC Capital' derived from Steven A Cohen's initials. The company started trading with $25 million in 1992, grew its assets under management to $16 billion, and became the world's highest-returning hedge fund: SAC averaged annual returns of 30% net of fees under a 3% management fee and 50% performance fee from 1992 to 2013. The company's strategy was the "mosaic theory of investing" which develops investment positions based on stock information from many sources. SAC focused on trading liquid, large-cap stocks and later began using fundamental and quantitative strategies. The company had $14 billion in assets under management across four independent portfolios at the start of 2013. According to Bloomberg BusinessWeek magazine, SAC Capital Advisors daily trading activity accounted for as much as 3% of the New York Stock Exchange's daily trading and up to 1% of the NASDAQ's daily trades. SAC Capital maintained offices in Stamford, Connecticut; New York City; Hong Kong; Tokyo; Singapore; London; Boston; San Francisco; and Chicago.

On December 9, 2013, SAC agreed to sell its reinsurance business, SAC Re, to a group of investors led by insurance-industry veteran Brian Duperreault.

=== Biovail ===
In March 2006, 60 Minutes reported on a lawsuit against SAC filed by Biovail, a Canadian pharmaceutical company which alleged that SAC had manipulated reports on Biovail in order to drive the price of the stock down. SAC denied the charges and said that the stock was overvalued and that the decline was due to shortfalls in earnings and regulatory investigations. In August 2009, the New Jersey Superior Court dismissed all of Biovail's claims against SAC Capital. On February 10, 2010, SAC Capital filed a lawsuit in federal court in Connecticut seeking damages from Biovail for filing "vexatious" litigation against them in 2006. The lawsuit was settled out of court in November 2010. Under the settlement, Biovail's new owner, Valeant Pharmaceuticals, paid $10 million to SAC.

=== Fairfax Financial Holdings ===
In July 2006, SAC Capital Advisors was one of three industry participants that were sued by Fairfax Financial Holdings Ltd (FFH) and accused of conspiring to manipulate the company's stock price. FFH alleged SAC Capital and two other hedge funds paid analyst John Gywnn and his employer Morgan Keegan to publish negative reports on FFH and drive its stock price down. In December 2008, Fairfax Financial Holdings provided email exchanges as evidence to the court amongst the hedge funds and Gywnn, that discussed the content of the soon-to-be-published report on FFH. In September 2011, the Superior Court in Morris County, New Jersey, granted SAC Capital Advisors’ motion for summary judgment and removed SAC Capital Advisors, Sigma Capital Management, a division of SAC Capital Advisors, and Steven Cohen as defendants from the case. Judge Stephan C. Hansbury wrote in his judgement: “There is no direct evidence of any sort of conspiracy involving SAC to take down Fairfax."

=== Insider trading cases ===
A 2013 article in Yahoo! Finance reported that SAC Capital Advisors had been under investigation by the Securities and Exchange Commission (SEC) for six years. In November 2010, the SEC conducted raids at the offices of investment companies run by former SAC traders. Several days later, SAC received what they described as "extraordinarily broad" subpoenas. In February 2011, two former employees were charged with insider trading. In November 2012, federal prosecutors levied charges against additional former SAC Capital traders. Portfolio manager Michael Steinberg was arrested in March 2013 and accused of using inside information to make $1.4 million in profits for SAC Capital. While awaiting a jury verdict, Steinberg fainted, recovered, and was convicted. He was sentenced to three-and-a-half years in prison and ordered to pay a $2 million fine. After the United States Supreme Court declined to review a United States Court of Appeals for the Second Circuit ruling on two related insider trading convictions, which made it difficult to prosecute insider trading cases, Mr. Steinberg’s conviction was dismissed.

In July 2013, SAC Capital was charged with conspiracy and securities fraud, citing the actions of 8 current and former employees. With the conviction of Mathew Martoma on February 6, 2014, and after a four-week trial, a total of eight former SAC Capital employees were either convicted at trial or pleaded guilty. In October 2015, cases against two of the employees were dropped. In June 2019, another employee successfully vacated his plea, and prosecutors later dropped the case, filing a nolle prosequi, marking 3 of the 8 original pleas/convictions being dropped. A former employee later argued that prosecutors had violated the New York Rules of Professional Conduct in withholding exculpatory evidence through his prosecution, but no hearing was ever held on his claims.

In July 2013, the SEC filed a civil suit against SAC for failing to properly supervise its traders. Additionally, the U.S. Department of Justice "filed a five count criminal indictment by a federal grand jury, including four counts of securities fraud and one count of wire fraud." SAC said it would "vigorously fight" the accusations and charges, but shortly thereafter, in November 2013, SAC Capital agreed to plead guilty to all counts of the indictment, stop managing funds for outsiders, and pay a $1.2 billion fine. It already agreed to $616 million in fines and penalties, totally 1.8 billion. This was split between a $900 million fine in the criminal case and a $900 million forfeiture judgment in a civil money laundering and forfeiture action. Trading teams at SAC have since left to join competing hedge funds such as BlueCrest Capital Management, Millennium Management, and Balyasny Asset Management. On September 8, 2014, Martoma was sentenced to 9 years in prison and was ordered to forfeit nearly $9.4 million, more than his net worth.

== Point72 Asset Management ==
Point72 Asset Management was established as a separate family office in 2014. SAC ceased to exist as a separate entity in 2016. Point72, essentially the continuation of SAC, manages $45.7 billion as of 2026.

== See also ==
- Billions (TV series)
- Chip Skowron, former SAC Capital healthcare analyst, later convicted of insider trading and sentenced to five years.
