= List of Facebook features =

Facebook is a social-network service website launched on February 4, 2004, by Mark Zuckerberg. The following is a list of software and technology features that can be found on the Facebook website and mobile app and are available to users of the social media site.

== Facebook structure ==
=== News Feed ===
The news feed is the primary system through which users are exposed to content posted on the network. Using a secret method (initially known as EdgeRank), Facebook selects a handful of updates to actually show users every time they visit their feed, out of an average of 1500 updates they can potentially receive.

On September 6, 2006, Ruchi Sanghvi announced a new home page feature called News Feed. Originally, when users logged into Facebook, they were presented with a customizable version of their own profile. The new layout, by contrast, created an alternative home page in which users saw a constantly updated list of their friends' Facebook activity. News Feed highlights information that includes profile changes, upcoming events, and birthdays, among other updates. This has enabled spammers and other users to manipulate these features by creating illegitimate events or posting fake birthdays to attract attention to their profile or cause. News Feed also shows conversations taking place between the walls of a user's friends. An integral part of the News Feed interface is the Mini Feed, a news stream on the user's profile page that shows updates about that user. Unlike in the News Feed, the user can delete events from the Mini Feed after they appear so that they are no longer visible to profile visitors. In 2011, Facebook updated the News Feed to show top stories and most recent stories in one feed, and the option to highlight stories to make them top stories, as well as to un-highlight stories. In response to users' criticism, Facebook later updated the News Feed to allow users to view recent stories first.

Initially, the addition of the News Feed caused some discontent among Facebook users. Many users complained that the News Feed was too cluttered with excess information. Others were concerned that the News Feed made it too easy for other people to track activities like changes in relationship status, events, and conversations with other users. This tracking is often casually referred to as "Facebook-Stalking". In response to this dissatisfaction, creator Mark Zuckerberg issued an apology for the site's failure to include appropriate customizable privacy features. Thereafter, users were able to control what types of information were shared automatically with friends. Currently, users may prevent friends from seeing updates about several types of especially private activities, although other events are not customizable in this way.

With the introduction of the "New Facebook" in early February 2010 came a complete redesign of the pages, several new features and changes to News Feeds. On their personal Feeds (now integrated with Walls), users were given the option of removing updates from any application as well as choosing the size they show up on the page. Furthermore, the community feed (containing recent actions by the user's friends) contained options to instantly select whether to hear more or less about certain friends or applications.

On March 7, 2013, Facebook announced a redesigned newsfeed. In 2022, Facebook's parent company, Meta Platforms, announced it is renaming the "News Feed" to simply be named "Feed".

=== Friends ===
"Friending" someone on the platform is the act of sending another user a "friend request" on Facebook. The two people are Facebook friends once the receiving party accepts the friend request. In addition to accepting the request, the user has the option of declining the friend request or hiding it using the "Not Now" feature. Deleting a friend request removes the request, but does allow the sender to resend it in the future. The "Not Now" feature hides the request but does not delete it, allowing the receiver to revisit the request at a later date.

It is also possible to remove a user from one's friends, which is referred to as "unfriending" by Facebook. Many Facebook users also refer to the process as "de-friending". "Unfriend" was New Oxford American Dictionary's word of the year in 2009. Facebook does not notify a user if they have been unfriended, but there are scripts that provide this functionality. There has also been a study on why Facebook users unfriend, which found that differences, especially between ages, and few mutual friendships were the dominant factors correlated with unfriending, all of which mirrors the decline of physical-world relationships.

Facebook profiles also have advanced privacy features to restrict content to certain users, such as non-friends or persons on a specific list.

=== Wall ===
The wall is the original profile space where Facebook users' content was displayed, until December 2011. It allowed the posting of messages, often short or temporal notes, for the user to see while displaying the time and date the message was written. A user's wall is visible to anyone with the ability to see their full profile, and friends' wall posts appear in the user's News Feed.

In July 2007, Facebook allowed users to post attachments to the wall, whereas previously the wall was limited to text only. In May 2008, the Wall-to-Wall for each profile was limited to only 40 posts. Facebook later allowed users to insert HTML code in boxes attached to the wall via apps like Static FBML which has allowed marketers to track use of their fan pages with Google Analytics.

The concept of tagging in status updates, an attempt to imitate Twitter, began September 14, 2009. This meant putting the name of a user, a brand, an event or a group in a post in such a way that it linked to the wall of the Facebook page being tagged, and made the post appear in news feeds for that page, as well as those of selected friends. This was first done using the "@" symbol followed by the person's name. Later, a numerical ID for the person could be used. Visually, this was displayed with bold text. Early in 2011, tagging in comments was added.

In addition to postings by other users, the wall also displayed other events that happened to the user's profile. This included when information was changed, when they changed their profile picture, and when they connected with new people, among other things.

The wall has been replaced by the Timeline profile layout, which was introduced in December 2011.

=== Timeline ===
In September 2011, Facebook introduced "Timeline" at its developer conference, intended to revamp users' profiles in order to show content based on year, month and date. "Cover" photos were introduced, taking up a significant portion of the top of pages, and a redesigned display of personal information such as friends, likes and photos appeared on the left-hand side, while story posts appeared on the right. The new design introduced flexible sizing for story posts in the feed, along with more prominent location and photo placement. The Timeline also encouraged scrolling, with constantly loading story posts of users' pasts. Timeline began gradually rolling out to users in New Zealand starting December 7, 2011, and was made officially available to all users worldwide on December 15. By January, the switch to Timeline became required for all users. In February 2012, Timeline became available for Facebook Pages.

=== Likes and Reactions ===
The "like" button on Facebook

The like button, first enabled on February 9, 2009, enables users to easily interact with status updates, comments, photos, links shared by friends, videos and advertisements. Once clicked by a user, the designated content appears in the News Feeds of that user's friends, and the button also displays the number of other users who have liked the content, including a full or partial list of those users. The like button was extended to comments in June 2010. After extensive testing and years of questions from the public about whether it had an intention to incorporate a "Dislike" button, Facebook officially rolled out "Reactions" to users worldwide on February 24, 2016, letting users long-press on the like button for an option to use one of six pre-defined emotions, including "Like", "Love", "Haha", "Wow", "Sad", or "Angry" and for a limited time the following reactions, "Care", "Pride Flag", "Thankful". Reactions were also extended to comments in May 2017.

In June 2017, in celebration of Pride month, Facebook introduced a rainbow flag as part of its Reactions options. The design of the reactions was updated in April 2019, with more frames comprising the icons' animations as well as a general graphical overhaul. Around September 2019 Facebook conducted a trial in Australia to hide the like count on posts. In 2020 during the COVID-19 outbreak, a "Care" reaction was added to Facebook.

=== Comments ===
To mark the 30th anniversary of the GIF, Facebook has introduced a new feature enabling users to add GIFs to comments. The eagerly awaited feature can be accessed using the GIF button located beside the emoji picker. Users can choose from the available GIFs sourced from Facebook's GIF partners, but cannot upload other GIFs.

GIFs aside, the comments feature also allow users to attach stickers. Facebook has a standard sticker set, whereby sticker options are categorised according to popular moods and activities such as "Happy", "Eating", and "Confused". In 2020, Facebook introduced "Make Your Avatar" which enables users to customize a virtual look-alike of yourself to use as stickers in comments as well as Messenger chats. Essentially Facebook's version of Snap's Bitmoji, Avatars have been since made available in Australia, New Zealand, Europe and Canada.

In December 2015, an indicator was added to the comment area to show when a friend is typing a new comment.

=== Messages and inbox ===
Facebook Messenger is an instant messaging service and software application. Originally developed as Facebook Chat in 2008, the company revamped its messaging service in 2010, and subsequently released standalone iOS and Android apps in August 2011. Over the years, Facebook has released new apps on a variety of different operating systems, launched a dedicated website interface, and separated the messaging functionality from the main Facebook app, requiring users to download the standalone apps.

Facebook Messenger lets Facebook users send messages to each other. Complementing regular conversations, Messenger lets users make voice calls and video calls both in one-to-one interactions and in group conversations. Its Android app has integrated support for SMS and "Chat Heads", which are round profile photo icons appearing on-screen regardless of what app is open, while both apps support multiple accounts, conversations with optional end-to-end encryption, and playing "Instant Games", which are select games built into Messenger. Some features, including sending money and requesting transportation, are limited to the United States. In 2017, Facebook has added "Messenger Day", a feature that lets users share photos and videos in a story-format with all their friends with the content disappearing after 24 hours; Reactions, which lets users tap and hold a message to add a reaction through an emoji; and Mentions, which lets users in group conversations type @ to give a particular user a notification.

In March 2015, Facebook announced that it would start letting businesses and users interact through Messenger with features such as tracking purchases and receiving notifications, and interacting with customer service representatives. It also announced that third-party developers could integrate their apps into Messenger, letting users enter an app while inside Messenger and optionally share details from the app into a chat. In April 2016, it introduced an API for developers to build chatbots into Messenger, for uses such as news publishers building bots to give users news through the service, and in April 2017, it enabled the M virtual assistant for users in the U.S., which scans chats for keywords and suggests relevant actions, such as its payments system for users mentioning money. Additionally, Facebook expanded the use of bots, incorporating group chatbots into Messenger as "Chat Extensions", adding a "Discovery" tab for finding bots, and enabling special, branded QR codes that, when scanned, take the user to a specific bot.

In August 2018, Facebook discontinued users' ability to post to their Timeline using SMS.

In September 2022, Facebook added the "Community Chats" function, allowing people in a Facebook group to chat between each other on Messenger and on the Messenger app.

=== Notifications ===
Notifications tell the user that something has been added to their profile page. Examples include: a message being shared on the user's wall or a comment on a picture of the user or on a picture that the user has previously commented on. Initially, notifications for events were limited to one per event; these were eventually grouped category-wise. For instance, 10 users having liked a user's picture now count for one notification, whereas in the earlier stages, these would have accounted for ten separate notifications. The number of notifications can be changed in the settings section, to a maximum of 99. There is a red notification counter at the top of the page, which if clicked displays the most recent ones.

=== Groups ===
Facebook Groups can be created by individual users. Groups allow members to post content such as links, media, questions, events, editable documents, and comments on these items. Groups are used for collaboration and allow discussions, events, and numerous other activities. They are a way of enabling a number of people to come together online to share information and discuss specific subjects. They are increasingly used by clubs, companies and public sector organizations to engage with stakeholders, be they members of the public, employees, members, service users, shareholders or customers. Groups can have two different levels of privacy settings:

- "Open" means both the group, its members and their comments are visible to the public (which includes non-members) but they cannot interact without joining.
- "Secret" means that nothing can be viewed by the public unless a member specifically invites another user to join the group.

In October 2010, there were version 0 (legacy) and version 1 (current) groups. Version 1 or "new" groups can contain the name of the group in their URL if the email address of the group is set. Groups do not have a RSS feed to export the wall or the member list, such as Pages or Events have, but third parties provide such service if the group is set to an "open" privacy setting. All groups have since been migrated to a single design.

== Applications ==
=== Events ===
Facebook events are a way for members to let friends know about upcoming events in their community and to organize social gatherings. Events require an event name, network, host name, event type, start time, location, and a guest list of friends invited. Events can be public or private. Private events cannot be found in searches and are by invitation only. People who have not been invited cannot view a private event's description, Wall, or photos. They also will not see any Feed stories about the event. When setting up an event the user can choose to allow friends to upload photos or videos. Note that unlike real world events, all events are treated as separate entities (when the reality is some events sit inside other events, going to one event would preclude going to another, and so on).

In February 2011, Facebook began to use the hCalendar microformat to mark up events, and the hCard microformat for the events' venues, enabling the extraction of details to users' own calendar or mapping applications. Third parties facilitate events to be exported from Facebook pages to the iCalendar-format.

=== Marketplace ===
In 2007, Facebook introduced the Facebook Marketplace, allowing users to post classified ads within sale, housing, and jobs categories. However, the feature never gained traction, and in 2009, control was transferred to Oodle, the platform powering the functionality. The feature was then eventually shut down in 2014.

In October 2016, Facebook announced a new Marketplace, citing the growth of organized "buy and sell" Facebook Groups, and gave the new version a higher prominence in the main Facebook app, taking the navigation position previously held by Facebook Messenger. According to Facebook's internal data from 2019, the Marketplace used to only be a C2C platform but now there is a major B2C opportunity for US retailers.

In June 2021, the European Commission and Competition and Markets Authority launched antitrust probes over concerns that Facebook's Marketplace took advantage of data from competing services that advertise on the platform and used it to gain "an undue competitive advantage".

=== Notes ===
Facebook Notes was introduced on August 22, 2006, as a blogging platform offering users the ability to write notes, attach photos, and optionally import blog entries from external sources.

The most known usage form of the Notes feature was the Internet meme "25 Random Things About Me", which involves writing 25 things about the user that their friends do not already know about them and using the tag function to ask 25 friends to do the same. The trend became popular in February 2009, with The New York Times discussing its sudden surge, noting that nearly five million notes were created for the purpose, a doubling of the feature's use in the previous week and larger than any other week in Facebook's history.

In September 2015, the Notes feature received an update, bringing additional features, such as adding a cover photo and caption, the ability to resize photos, and text formatting options.

The Notes feature became read-only on October 31, 2020, and then entirely disappeared without notice a few weeks later.

=== Places ===
Facebook announced Places on August 18, 2010. It is a feature that lets users check into Facebook using a mobile device to let a user's friends know where they are at the moment.

In November 2010, Facebook announced "Deals", a subset of the Places offering, which allows for users to check in from restaurants, supermarkets, bars, and coffee shops using an app on a mobile device and then be rewarded discounts, coupons, and free merchandise. This feature is marketed as a digital version of a loyalty card or coupon where a customer gets rewarded for loyal buying behavior.

On October 10, 2010, Places became available on BlackBerry, iPhone, and Android. Other users, including Windows Mobile users, must use an HTML5 browser to use Places via Facebook Touch Site.

Facebook Places was reported discontinued on August 24, 2011, but was relaunched in November 2014, now including cover images, discovery sections, city/category landing pages, a deeper integration with the Location API, Graph Search queries and user generated content.

=== Platform ===
The Facebook Platform provides a set of APIs and tools which enable third-party developers to integrate with the "open graph", whether through applications on Facebook.com or external websites and devices. Launched on May 24, 2007, Facebook Platform has evolved from enabling development just on Facebook.com to one also supporting integration across the web and devices.

Facebook Platform Statistics as of May 2010:

- More than one million developers and entrepreneurs from more than 180 countries
- More than 550,000 active applications currently on Facebook Platform
- Every month, more than 70% of Facebook users engage with Platform applications
- More than 250,000 websites have integrated with Facebook Platform
- More than 100 million Facebook users engage with Facebook on external websites every month

On August 29, 2007, Facebook changed the way in which the popularity of applications is measured, to give attention to the more engaging applications, following criticism that ranking applications only by the number of people who had installed the application was giving an advantage to the highly viral, yet useless applications. Tech blog Valleywag has criticized Facebook Applications, labeling them a "cornucopia of uselessness". Others have called for limiting third-party applications so the Facebook "user experience" is not degraded.

Primarily attempting to create viral applications is a method that has certainly been employed by numerous Facebook application developers. Stanford University even offered a class in the Fall of 2007, entitled, Computer Science (CS) 377W: "Create Engaging Web Applications Using Metrics and Learning on Facebook". Numerous applications created by the class were highly successful, and ranked amongst the top Facebook applications, with some achieving over 3.5 million users in a month.

=== Facebook Questions ===
In May 2010, Facebook began testing Questions, which is expected to compete with services such as Yahoo Answers.

On March 24, 2011, Facebook announced that its new product, Facebook Questions, facilitates short, poll -like answers in addition to long-form responses, and also links directly to relevant items in Facebook's directory of "fan pages".

=== Photos ===
Facebook allows users to upload photos, and to add them to albums. In December 2010, the company enabled facial recognition technology, helping users identify people to tag in uploaded photos. In May 2011, Facebook launched a feature to tag specific Facebook pages in photos, including brands, products, and companies. On mobile, Facebook introduced photo filters in August 2011.

In May 2016, Facebook started allowing users to upload and view 360-degree photos. Mobile users will move their device around to navigate the environment, while website users will have to click and drag.

According to Facebook in 2010, there were over 50 billion photos stored on the service.

=== Videos ===
In May 2007, Facebook officially launched its video platform, allowing users to upload recorded videos or livestream videos from their webcams. The service supports the ability to "tag" friends in similar ways to photos. In December 2014, Facebook began rolling out functionality for business Pages to pin ("Feature") a video to the top of their Videos tab.

In January 2015, Facebook published a report detailing a significant growth in video viewing on the platform, specifically highlighting the fact that Facebook has seen an average of one billion video views every day since June 2014.

In September 2015, Facebook announced that it would begin showing view counts for publicly posted videos. A few weeks later, the company announced that users will be able to view 360-degree videos. On the website, users can click around to change the perspective, whereas mobile users can physically move their device to interact with the virtual space. The result is the work of a collaboration between Facebook and its Oculus division.

==== Live streaming ====
In August 2015, Facebook began to allow users to live stream video. Streams appear on the News Feed, and users can comment on them in real-time. Live broadcasts are automatically saved as a video post to the streamer's page. The feature was positioned as a competitor to services such as Meerkat and Periscope.

The feature was initially available only to verified public figures through the Facebook Mentions app (which is also exclusive to these users). Live streaming began to roll out for public use in January 2016, beginning with the Facebook iOS app in the United States.

In April 2016, Facebook unveiled a live-streaming API, aimed to allow developers to use any device, including professional video cameras and drones, to integrate with the live-video streaming platform. Facebook also updated its mobile app to provide a dedicated section for showcasing current and recent live broadcasts. To drive its adoption, Facebook provided incentives to publishers and celebrities to perform live broadcasts, including monetary rewards.

In March 2017, Facebook extended live-streaming support to PCs. In May, Facebook Live was updated on iOS to let two users livestream together, and the following month, Facebook added support for closed captioning to live video. This is limited to the CEA-608 standard, a notable difference from the automatic closed captioning available for Page videos that are recorded and then uploaded, due to difficulties in adapting the same standard at scale on the low-latency real-time nature for live content.

At the end of 2017, Facebook Live was updated to offer support for livestreaming Facebook Messenger games.

==== Controversial use ====
Facebook Live was used by the perpetrators of an incident in which four black young adults kidnapped and tortured a mentally disabled white male. All four were charged and convicted of hate crimes. Facebook Live was also used by Brenton Tarrant, perpetrator of the Christchurch mosque shootings to broadcast the attack on Al Noor Mosque. A total of 51 people were killed and another 40 were injured at Al Noor and in a subsequent attack at Linwood Islamic Centre. This video was viewed over 4,000 times and had 200 watching it live. Because of this, Facebook announced it would be considering restrictions on the service. The service was also used to broadcast the hostage taking during the Nakhon Ratchasima shootings, which ultimately left 30 people dead including the perpetrator and 58 others injured. A shooting spree in Memphis in September 2022 was livestreamed by the suspect, a 19-year-old male; witnesses who viewed the stream saw him entering a store and shooting at customers inside. Additionally, Ronnie McNutt, an army veteran, committed suicide on a Facebook Live stream, leading to the footage spreading outside of Facebook Live to other social media platforms, including TikTok and Instagram, also owned by Meta.

=== Facebook Paper ===
During the same week as its tenth anniversary (in 2014), Facebook launched the Paper iPhone app. The app consists of two major features: Firstly, Facebook's News Feed is more graphic, as the app uses technology such as full-screen photos and video footage. Content is organized under headings such as "Creators" and "Planet"; secondly, Paper allows users to post statuses, photos, and "stories" to Facebook that has been described as a different, more presentation-focused design.

=== Facebook Mentions ===
Facebook Mentions, initially an iOS-only app, was released by the company in 2014. It allows public figures with a verified account to engage with their respective fanbases in a more concentrated experience. The app had been in testing with select celebrities for nearly a year before its launch. In September 2015, Facebook expanded the availability of the Mentions app to journalists and other verified pages, and also gave users of the app the ability to post exclusively to their Facebook followers rather than both followers and friends. The update also enabled the first livestreaming functionality through Facebook Live. Facebook Mentions became available on Android in January 2016. In December 2016, Facebook Live on Mentions received several updates, including comment moderation tools, broadcasting appearance customization, and editing features to remove unnecessary footage at the beginning or end of a broadcast.

=== Facebook Moments ===
Facebook Moments was a private photo sharing app launched by Facebook in 2015 but discontinued on February 25, 2019. The app was powered by Facebook's facial recognition technology to group photos and let users easily share them.

=== Facebook Podcasts ===
Facebook Podcast was unveiled in April and launched on June 22, 2021. The integration allows listeners to find, subscribe to and listen to shows within the Facebook platform.

In addition to the podcast product, Facebook is also working on other audio-focused offerings like a virtual chatroom feature akin to Clubhouse and short-form audio posts dubbed "Soundbites".

== General features ==
=== Facebook dynamic text/type ===
In November 2015, Facebook made changes to their text-only status update on Timeline to allow for adjustable text sizes (dynamic text) on mobile apps.

=== Credits ===
Facebook Credits are a virtual currency users can use to buy gifts, and virtual goods in many games and applications on the Facebook platform. As of July 2010, users of Facebook can purchase Facebook credits in Australian Dollars, British Pounds, Canadian Dollars, Chilean peso, Colombian peso, Danish krone, Euro, Hong Kong dollar, Japanese yen, Norwegian krone, Swedish krona, Swiss franc, Turkish lira, US Dollars, and Venezuelan Bolivar. Facebook credits can be used on many popular games such as Happy Aquarium, Happy Island, Zoo Paradise, Happy Pets, Hello City, It Girl, FarmVille, and Mafia Wars.

Facebook Credits went into its alpha stage in May 2009 and progressed into the beta stage in February 2010, which ended in January 2011. At that time, Facebook announced all Facebook game developers would be required to process payments only through Facebook Credits from July 1, 2011. In March 2011, Facebook created an official subsidiary to handle payments: Facebook Payments Inc. In June 2012, Facebook announced it would no longer use its own money system, Facebook Credits. Users with credits will see them converted into their own currencies. Facebook Credits was officially removed from Facebook in September 2013.

=== Feature phones ===
Although like all other website apps Facebook made its presence on the smartphones as mentioned but also is present for the feature phones. As the company said that the feature phones dominate the American cell phone markets, hence an app was exclusively made for this purpose as well.

=== Graph Search ===
Released in July 2013, Graph Search allows users to search within their network of friends for answers to natural language questions such as, "Movies my friends who like The Hobbit liked" and receive direct answers, rather than the list of websites that search engines usually provide.

=== IPv6 ===
According to a June 2010 report by Network World, Facebook said that it was offering "experimental, non-production" support for IPv6, the long-anticipated upgrade to the Internet's main communications protocol. The news about Facebook's IPv6 support was expected; Facebook told Network World in February 2010, that it planned to support native IPv6 user requests "by the midpoint of this year".

In a presentation at the Google IPv6 Implementors Conference, Facebook's network engineers said it was "easy to make [the] site available on v6". Facebook said it deployed dual-stack IPv4 and IPv6 support on its routers, and that it made no changes to its hosts in order to support IPv6. Facebook also said it was supporting an emerging encapsulation mechanism known as Locator/Identifier Separation Protocol (LISP), which separates Internet addresses from endpoint identifiers to improve the scalability of IPv6 deployments. "Facebook was the first major Web site on LISP (v4 and v6)", Facebook engineers said during their presentation. Facebook said that using LISP allowed them to deploy IPv6 services quickly with no extra cost. In addition, Facebook enabled IPv6 on its main domain names during World IPv6 Launch.

=== Listen with Friends ===
Listen with Friends allows Facebook users to listen to music and discuss the tunes using Facebook Chat with friends at the same time. Users can also listen in as a group while one friend acts as a DJ. Up to 50 friends can listen to the same song at the same time, and chat about it. Every time a user begins listening to music with a friend, a "story will be posted to her/his friends" ticker and/or news feed. Users will have control over who will be able to see when they are listening with a friend through their App Settings page after installing the compatible music app. This feature was initially supported through Audizer.com, but as of August 2012, services were discontinued and the Facebook / Audizer splash page has been redirected to Facebook.com.

=== Mood faces ===
Facebook chat supports numerous emoticons, like (^^^) for a shark. Recently, it has also become possible to post larger, animated images through Facebook's built in emotion system.

- At one time, entering the Konami Code followed by Enter at the home page caused a lensflare-style series of circles to display when clicking, typing, or scrolling.
- Asking "how is babby formed?" with the Questions feature released September 23, 2010, will Rickroll the user.
- A user can change his/her language to upside down English.
- Entering @[x:y] resolves a user's name, where x is a positive integer and y is 0 or 1. For example, @[4:0] resolves to "Mark Zuckerberg".

=== Phone ===
At an event in April 2013, Mark Zuckerberg announced a new Android-based "Home" feature, which would show content from users' Facebook pages on the home page of their mobile phones, without having to open an app.

=== Poke and Greetings ===
Since Facebook's inception, users have had the ability to "poke" other users. The feature, its actual purpose never officially explained by the company, served as a quick way to attract the attention of another user. In a 2007 opinion article in The Guardian, Facebook explained to a question about the "poke" that "When we created the poke, we thought it would be cool to have a feature without any specific purpose. People interpret the poke in many different ways, and we encourage you to come up with your own meanings." The feature was never removed from Facebook; in December 2017, the company gave the button a significantly more prominent placement on users' profiles, along with new forms of quick interactions, including "hug", "wink" and "high-five", collectively all referred to as "Greetings".

=== Smartphone integration ===
Many smartphones offer access to the Facebook services either through their respective web browsers or through mobile apps.

The iPhone-compatible website was launched in August 2007, followed by a dedicated iOS app in July 2008. The early mobile website was severely limited in its feature set, only gaining the ability to post comments in late 2008, a year after launch. By 2009, other companies had developed Facebook mobile apps for Nokia, HTC, LG, Motorola, Samsung, Sony Ericsson, and Windows Mobile devices, though a significant portion of Facebook's userbase was still using the original mobile website. During the early success of app stores, Facebook gambled on the idea of a universal webpage rather than specific operating systems, choosing to maintain its primary focus on its mobile site. CEO Mark Zuckerberg told Fortune that such a decision was "probably one of the biggest mistakes we've ever made". While the app was experiencing significant criticism for software bugs and crashes, Facebook began its "Facebook for Every Phone" initiative in January 2011, designing an app for a large number of feature phones. As Android and iOS rose in popularity, Facebook shifted its focus, creating dedicated apps for each platform. However, Facebook was still not entirely convinced, using a "hybrid" solution of native computing code as a sort of "picture frame" for its mobile website. Mashable described it as a "one-size-fits-all nightmare". In October 2011, Facebook updated its iOS app with support for iPad, adding larger photos and enabling more functionality, including the ability to post status updates and photos. Finally, in 2012, the company relaunched its Android and iOS apps, going mobile-first and putting all of its resources into making an optimized experience for smartphones, including significant speed improvements. In the years since, the company has increasingly expanded the feature set of its apps, dedicating more resources and seeing its userbase shifting from the mobile web to its apps.

Third-party companies also created Facebook apps for their platforms. Microsoft developed a Facebook app for their Windows Phone 7 platform in February 2012, Nokia offered a Facebook app on its Ovi Store for Nokia S60 devices in June 2009, while BlackBerry also offered a Facebook application for its software platform in September 2012.

=== Fundraising ===
In December 2013, Facebook enabled a "Donate" button for charities and non-profit organizations to raise money. Approximately two years later, the company released a new fundraiser feature, exclusively allowing non-profits to set up campaign pages and collect payments. This was expanded in June 2016, when anyone could set up fundraisers on behalf of non-profit organizations, and again expanded in March 2017 to offer personal users in the United States the ability to raise money, as well as for Facebook Pages to add a "Donate" button to their Facebook Live video streams. In May, fundraisers were expanded with support for communities and sports teams, and subsequently, in September, expanded internationally for charities in Europe.

=== Status updates ===
"Status updates" (also called a "status") allows users to post messages for their friends to read. In turn, friends can respond with their own comments, as well as clicking the "Like" button. A user's most recent updates appear at the top of their Timeline/Wall and are also noted in the "Recently Updated" section of a user's friend list. Originally, the purpose of the feature was to allow users to inform their friends of their current "status", including feelings, whereabouts, or actions, where Facebook prompted the status update with "Username is"... and users filled in the rest. This feature first became available in September 2006, though on December 13, 2007, the requirement to start a status update with is was removed.

The is updates were followed by the "What are you doing right now?" status update question; in March 2009, the question was changed to "What's on your mind?" In 2009, Facebook added the feature to tag certain friends (or groups, etc.) within one's status update by adding an @ character before their name, turning the friend's name into a link to their profile and including the message on the friend's wall. Tagging has since been updated to recognize friends' names by typing them into a status while a list of friends whose names match the inputted letters appears. A large percentage of the updates that are posted are humorous and as a result, many apps, websites and books have sprung up to help users to update their own.

=== Subscribe ===
In September 2011, Facebook launched a "Subscribe" button, allowing users to follow public updates from people without requiring a Facebook friendship connection. The feature was expanded to Pages in July 2012, and to stories in the News Feed in August 2012.

=== Ticker ===
In September 2011, Facebook launched the "Ticker", a continually-updated feed on the right side of the screen showing friends' activities, including "likes", status updates, and comments. The feed was criticized by users for offering a quiet way to stalk users' every move, prompting the company to consider removing it in a March 2013 redesign, though never did. In December 2017, the company officially ended the "Ticker" feature, though quietly and without an announcement or explanation.

=== URL shortener ===
Starting June 2009, Facebook lets users choose a username specifically for their profile, enabling them to share links bearing their own www.Facebook.com/username URL address. There are limitations, however, to what usernames can be used, including only alphanumerical characters (A-Z, 0–9), a length of over five characters, only one username that is unique to the profile, and must adhere to Facebook's Statement of Rights and Responsibilities agreement. The following December, Facebook launched its own URL shortener based on the FB.me domain name.

=== Verified accounts ===
TechCrunch reported in February 2012 that Facebook would introduce a "Verified Account" concept, denoting official pages for public figures. Such pages gain more prominence in the "People To Subscribe To" suggestions lists. Persons with established stage names, such as Stefani Germanotta known as Lady Gaga, can also choose to use their specific stage name for their profile, with the real name in the profile's "About" page. However, at the time, the feature did not show any visual signs of distinction from other pages. In May 2013, the concept was updated to include a blue checkmark badge to highlight the account's Verified status. In October 2015, Facebook introduced a "gray badge" verification system for local businesses with physical addresses, with the gray color intended to differentiate from its typical blue checkmarks assigned to celebrities, public figures, sports teams and media organizations.

=== Hashtagging support ===
On June 12, 2013, Facebook introduced its support for clickable hashtags to help users search for topics being actively discussed on the social network.

=== Impressum ===
In March 2014, some page administrators in Italy started being prompted to add an impressum to their Facebook page, described as "a legally mandated statement of the ownership and authorship of a document".

=== Tor hidden service ===
In October 2014, Facebook announced that users could connect to the website through a Tor hidden service using the privacy-protecting Tor browser and encrypted using SSL. Announcing the feature, Facebook engineer Alec Muffett said that "Facebook's onion address provides a way to access Facebook through Tor without losing the cryptographic protections provided by the Tor cloud. [...] It provides end-to-end communication, from your browser directly into a Facebook datacenter."

=== "Say Thanks" ===
In November 2014, Facebook introduced "Say Thanks", an experience that lets user create personalized video greeting cards for friends on Facebook.

=== Call-to-Action button ===
In December 2014, Facebook announced that Pages run by businesses can display a so-called "call-to-action button" next to the page's like button. "Call to action" is a customizable button that lets page administrators add external links for easy visitor access to the business' primary objective, with options ranging from "Book Now", "Contact Us", "Use App", "Play Game", "Shop Now", "Sign Up", and "Watch Video". Initially only rolled out in the United States, the feature was expanded internationally in February 2015.

=== Snooze ===
In September 2017, Facebook began testing a "Snooze" button, letting users temporarily unfollow friends for 24 hours, 7 days or 30 days. The following December, the feature was enabled for all users, though the period of temporary unfollowing is specifically for 30 days.

=== "Did You Know?" social questionnaires ===
In response to decreased use of status updates on Facebook, the company began enabling "Did You Know?" social questionnaires in December 2017. The feature, which asks users to answer questions that are then shared as a status update, includes such questions as "The superpower I want most is...", "The first thing I'd do after winning the lottery is...", and "A guilty pleasure that I'm willing to admit to is..."

=== Sound Collection music archive ===
In December 2017, Facebook announced "Sound Collection"; an archive of copyright- and payment-free soundtracks and audio effects its users can use in their videos.

=== Off-Facebook Activity ===
In an August 20 blogpost, Facebook's Chief Privacy Officer Erin Egan, and Director of Product Management David Baser, announced "Off-Facebook Activity", to be released in Ireland, South Korea, and Spain, before being rolled out globally. Egan and Baser outline that with the feature, "you can:

- See a summary of the information other apps and websites have sent Facebook through our online business tools, like Facebook Pixel or Facebook Login
- Disconnect this information from your account if you want to; and
- Choose to disconnect future off-Facebook activity from your account. You can do this for all of your off-Facebook activity, or just for specific apps and websites."

A second blogpost on Facebook's Engineering website says that, while users will be able to "Choose to disconnect future off-Facebook activity" from their accounts, there will be a 48-hour window in which data from other websites will remain linked to the account." During the 48-hour window when incoming off-Facebook data is still linked to your account, "it may be used for measurement purposes and to make improvements to our ads systems".

=== Memories ===
The Memories feature, introduced in late 2010, allows browsing ones timeline by year. A feature under the same name was introduced in June 2018, showing events from the same day of earlier years.

== Security ==
On May 12, 2011, Facebook announced that it is launching several new security features designed to protect users from malware and from getting their accounts hijacked.

Facebook will display warnings when users are about to be duped by clickjacking and cross-site scripting attacks in which they think they are following a link to an interesting news story or taking action to see a video and instead end up spamming their friends.

Facebook also offers two-factor authentication called "login approvals", which, if turned on, will require users to enter a code whenever they log into the site from a new or unrecognized device. The code is sent via text message to the user's mobile phone.

Facebook is partnering with the free Web of Trust safe surfing service to give Facebook users more information about the sites they are linking to from the social network. When a user clicks on a potentially malicious link, a warning box will appear that gives more information about why the site might be dangerous. The user can either ignore the warning or go back to the previous page.

== Removed features ==
=== Email ===
In February 2010, TechCrunch reported that Facebook was working to rewrite its messaging service to turn it into a "fully featured webmail product", dubbed "Project Titan". The feature, unofficially dubbed a "Gmail killer" internally, was launched on November 15, 2010, and allowed users to directly communicate with each other via Facebook using several different methods. Users could create their own "username@facebook.com" email address to communicate, use text messaging, or through the Facebook website or mobile app's instant messaging chat. All messages were contained within single threads in a unified inbox. The email service was terminated in February 2014 because of low uptake.

=== FBML ===
Facebook Markup Language (FBML) was considered to be Facebook's own version of HTML. While many of the tags of HTML can be used in FBML, there were also important tags that could not be used, such as HTML, HEAD, and BODY. Also, JavaScript could not be used with FBML.

According to the Facebook Markup Language (FBML) Developer's page, FBML is now deprecated. No new features will be added to FBML and developers are recommended to develop new applications utilizing HTML, JavaScript and CSS. FBML support ended January 1, 2012, and FBML was no longer functioning as of June 1, 2012.

=== Lite ===
In August 2009, Facebook announced the rollout of a "lite" version of the site, optimized for users on slower or intermittent Internet connections. Facebook Lite offered fewer services, excluded most third-party applications and required less bandwidth. A beta version of the slimmed-down interface was released first to invited testers before a broader rollout across users in the United States, Canada, and India. It was announced on April 20, 2010, that support for the "lite" service had ended and that users would be redirected back to the normal, full content, Facebook website. The service was operational for only eight months.

In June 2015, this feature was reintroduced as an app with a total size of less than 1 MB, primarily focusing markets where internet access is slow or limited.

=== Deals ===
Facebook announced a pilot program called Deals, which offered online coupons and discounts from local businesses, at an event at its Palo Alto office on 3 November 2010.

Deals launched on April 25, 2011, in five cities—Atlanta, Austin, Dallas, San Diego, and San Francisco—with the hope of expanding. This new offering was a direct competitor to other social commerce sites such as LivingSocial and Groupon for online coupons and deals-of-the-day. Facebook users were able to use Facebook Credits to purchase vouchers that could be redeemed for real goods and services.

Deals expanded to Charlotte, St. Louis and Minneapolis in late June 2011.

Facebook closed the Deals program on 26 August 2011, describing the product as a "test."
