= Serkan Piantino =

American computer scientist and software engineer

- Born: 1982 (age 43–44); Connecticut
- Education: Carnegie Mellon University, BS in computer science, 2004
- Occupations: Computer scientist; software engineer; technology executive; entrepreneur
- Years active: 2006-present
- Known for: Artificial intelligence engineering Technology policy
- Notable work: EdgeRank

Serkan Piantino is an American computer scientist, software engineer, technology executive, and entrepreneur.

== Early life and education ==
Piantino was born in 1982 and raised in Greenwich, Connecticut. His father was an architect. He became interested in computers as a child.

He attended Carnegie Mellon University and graduated with a BS in computer science in 2004. During the summer of 2003, he interned for congressman Chris Shays at the United States House of Representatives.

== Career ==
=== 2007-2016: Facebook ===
==== EdgeRank, Timeline ====
Following his graduation, Piantino moved to New York, where he worked as a software engineer for the investment management company Bridgewater Associates. He was offered an engineering job at Facebook in Palo Alto in March 2007 but turned it down, choosing instead to stay in New York to run the New York Marathon. He accepted the job when it was offered again six months later and moved to Palo Alto in October 2007.

Piantino began his career at Facebook as lead engineer for News Feed, a Facebook feature launched in 2006. Shortly after starting the job, he developed EdgeRank, an algorithm that determined what content Facebook users saw from their friends in News Feed. The EdgeRank algorithm and Facebook News Feed introduced personalized content streams to social media platforms; in an article that marked its ten-year anniversary, Wired reported that it was "the most important invention in the history of the social web."

In 2011, Piantino led the development of Timeline, a redesign of user profile pages that aggregated a user's posts, photos and check-ins to create what Facebook CEO Mark Zuckerberg described as "the story of your life." Zuckerberg assigned more than ten of Facebook's top engineers to Piantino's team, and Timeline—which originated at a hackathon—went from concept to completion in less than six months.^{[17]}

==== Facebook New York ====
In 2012, Piantino moved to New York to oversee the development of a Facebook engineering office. The Manhattan office was announced in January 2012 by Piantino, Facebook COO Sheryl Sandberg, New York senator Chuck Schumer, and mayor Michael Bloomberg, who said his goal was to make New York “the world's No. 1 hub for information technology and social media.”

During the planning phase, Piantino—then the New York site director and head of engineering—worked on products such as Chat from Facebook's midtown sales office. (Later branded as Messenger, Chat began at a hackathon and became one of Facebook's most popular features.)

Piantino chose the Wanamaker Building in the Astor Place neighborhood as the location for the new office based on its proximity to public transit options and the cultural energy of Greenwich Village. The interior of the 100,000 square two-floor office, designed by Frank Gehry, featured sunlit open workspaces. Piantino said the office reflected the practicality of an engineer: "We have a coffee bar because people love coffee, and a library because we do a lot of research, and people need a space to do some reading or get away from the hubbub of New York." During Piantino's tenure, the staff at Facebook in New York grew from 100 people in the midtown office to more than 2000 at Astor Place. Piantino led a staff of 1000 engineers.

Events for the tech community were regularly held at the Facebook office; Piantino said: "One of our ambitions here is to [provide] a comfortable space where we can talk about the technology we're building, other people can talk about what they're building, and we can help the tech community here do what it's unusually good at, which is feel like one team."

==== Facebook AI Research ====
In 2013, Piantino co-founded Facebook AI Research (FAIR). In addition to incorporating AI into everyday user tasks, early projects included making Facebook easier to use for the blind. Over an 18-month period, he worked with founding FAIR director Yann LeCun, widely known as a pioneer of modern AI, on the development of a custom-built GPU-powered server system that doubled the speed and efficiency of artificial intelligence research. The deep-learning hardware, codenamed Big Sur, was designed in conjunction with Quanta and Nvidia, and open-sourced in 2015. It was the first time a computing system specifically designed for machine learning and artificial intelligence research was released as an open source solution.

=== 2016-present: Spell, Reddit ===
Piantino's work with LeCun intensified his interest in deep learning and AI. He left Facebook in 2016 and in 2017 founded Spell, a platform that provided developers access to AI processing hardware as a cloud service.

Reddit acquired Spell in June 2022 to increase its machine language capabilities and improve speed and relevancy. Piantino joined Reddit as VP, Foundational Product. At Reddit, he led the launch of Reddit Answers, which uses AI to research user questions on Reddit.

== Tech policy and advocacy ==
Piantino has been an advocate for expanding the tech industry New York City and served on Mayor Michael Bloomberg's Council on Technology and Innovation after returning to the city in 2010. He has been on the board of directors for Tech:NYC, a non-profit that advocates for the tech community and represents New York's tech industry to local and federal government, since it was founded in 2016.

Piantino also served on the boards for the Economic Security Project and the Academy for Software Engineering. He is a member of the Dean's advisory board for Carnegie Mellon School of Computer Science.

== Personal life ==
Piantino and producer Emma Thorne were married in April 2023. They live in New York City.
