= Face book =

Common or web directory

Page of the 1967 face book for the University of Michigan Law School

A face book or facebook is a paper or online directory of individuals' photographs and names published by some American universities. In particular, the term denotes publications of this type distributed by university administrations at the start of the academic year, with the intention of helping students to get to know each other.

== History ==
According to the Oxford English Dictionary, the first known use of "face book" was found The Bullet in 1972. The phrase was also found in The Daily Princetonian in 1974. The phrase "face book", a printed collection of individuals' faces and names, was used by the character George in Season 6 Episode 1 of Newhart, which first aired on September 14, 1987.

Colleges and universities in the United States have often published official or unofficial books listing their students, faculty, or staff, together with pictures and limited biographical data. By the early 2000s, some face books were being published online offering a number of new features, including password protection, more detailed information, more advanced indexing and searching, and the ability for people to upload and enter information and photographs.

=== Facebook ===
In early 2004, Mark Zuckerberg, a sophomore at Harvard University, created an unofficial online face book at the website "thefacebook.com", the forerunner of the Facebook service, out of frustration that the university's official online face book project was taking too long. The development of a campus-wide face book had previously been stalled by privacy concerns, many of which became prominent in November 2003 when Zuckerberg was accused of breaching security and violating copyrights and individual privacy. Zuckerberg had created a website, www.facemash.com, that used photos taken without authorization from Harvard House–based face books, using the photos in a system to rate the attractiveness of students.

== See also ==
- Callbook
- Mug shot
- Telephone directory
- Yearbook
