= Feed (Facebook) =

Feature of the social network Facebook

Facebook's Feed for mobile devices

Facebook's Feed, formerly known as the News Feed, is a web feed feature of the social networking service. The feed is the primary system through which users are exposed to content posted on the network. Feed highlights information that includes profile changes, upcoming events, and birthdays, among other updates. Using a proprietary method, Facebook selects a handful of updates to show users every time they visit their feed, out of an average of 2,000 updates they can potentially receive. Over two billion people use Facebook every month, making the network's Feed the most viewed and most influential aspect of the news industry. The feature, introduced in 2006, was renamed "Feed" in 2022.

== History ==
Before 2006, Facebook simply consisted of profiles, requiring the user to visit a profile to see any new posts. On September 6, 2006, Facebook announced a new home page feature called "News Feed". The new layout created an alternative home page in which users saw a constantly updated list of their friends' Facebook activities. Initially, the addition of the News Feed caused discontent among Facebook users, many of whom complained that the feed was too intrusive, detailing every moment with timestamps, and violating their privacy. Some called for a boycott of the company. In response to this dissatisfaction, CEO Mark Zuckerberg issued a statement clarifying that "We didn't take away any privacy options." Following this, Zuckerberg later issued an open letter apologizing for a lack of information on new features and users' controls, writing that "We really messed this one up. [...] I'd like to try to correct those errors now."

The News Feed has received multiple updates over the years since its original setup. In 2008, Facebook added a feedback button to each story in a user's feed, letting them tell the service about their personal preferences for their feed. However, the feedback button was removed in April, and returned in July, with Facebook reportedly removing the first iteration of the feedback options due to a low impact on user satisfaction compared to other aspects of the algorithm.

In March 2009, Facebook rolled out the option to "Like" a page to see updates from it in their feed, gave users customizable filters to determine what friends they wanted to see News Feed updates from, and also added a publishing field at the top of the feed, previously exclusive to user profiles, for easy post creation. The publishing field contained the text "What's on your mind?", a similar but also notably different question from Twitter's "What are you doing right now?" A few weeks later, the company introduced controls to reduce content from app interactions, and enabled the feed to show photos in which friends were tagged.

In December 2010, Facebook rolled out a new drop-down button, offering users the ability to view News Feed by categories, including only games, status updates, photos, links, Pages, or specific groups of people.

In February 2011, Facebook added News Feed settings to let users specify if they want content from only the people and pages they interact with the most, rather than everyone. In September, Facebook updated the feed to show top stories and most recent stories, rather than relying on a strictly chronological order. Later the same year, it introduced the "ticker", a real-time extension of News Feed, located on the right side of the screen. At the end of the year, news outlets reported that Facebook would be starting allowing advertisements through "Sponsored Stories" in News Feed for the first time. Advertisements started rolling out on January 10, 2012, with a "Featured" tag declaring its paid status. Advertisements were expanded to mobile in February 2012.

In March 2013, Facebook held a press event to unveil new updates to News Feed, including a more minimalistic design with consistency across both the website and mobile devices. This included a new layout for posts, presenting friends' photos, shared articles, and maps with larger text and images, and brands' logos. New "sub-feeds" show updates in specific areas, such as posts from specific friends or interest updates. However, the initial limited rollout of the new design saw a trend of lower user engagement, prompting the company to stop the rollout. A year later, in March 2014, Facebook once again updated its News Feed, but in response to criticism from users, the company chose to scale back its efforts. While bringing bigger photos that span the width of the feed, font changes, and design tweaks to buttons and icons, the new design removed the drop-down menu, placing relevant entries in a navigation on the left side of the screen while removing some of the sub-feeds. It also simplified the comments system, altered the appearance of profile photos in the feed, and added a search bar at the top of the page. News Feed product manager Greg Marra explained that "People don't like us moving their furniture around, because you break muscle memory". Marra also stated that "Over the last year, we've spent a lot of time seeing what people were saying, what was working, what wasn't working, and we're rolling out the version that takes all of that feedback into account".

In January 2018, following a difficult 2017, marked by accusations of relaying fake news and revelations about groups close to Russia which tried to influence the 2016 US presidential election (see Russian interference in the 2016 United States elections) via advertisements on his service, Mark Zuckerberg announced in his traditional January post:

We're making a major change to how we build Facebook. I'm changing the goal I give our product teams from focusing on helping you find relevant content to helping you have more meaningful social interactions

— Mark Zuckerberg

Following surveys of Facebook users, this desire for change will take the form of a reconfiguration of the News Feed algorithms in order to:

- Prioritize content of family members and friends (Mark Zuckerberg January 12, Facebook: "The first changes you'll see will be in News Feed, where you can expect to see more from your friends, family and groups".)
- Give priority to news articles from local sources considered more credible

These changes are expected to improve "the amount of meaningful content viewed". However, a 2022 study shows that when news content is removed from the Feed, "many users will find almost nothing of value".

In 2022, Facebook's parent company, Meta Platforms, announced it is renaming the "News Feed" to simply be named "Feed".

== Influence ==
Approximately two billion people use the Facebook platform every month. Approximately 62 percent of adults in the United States use social media to get news, meaning Facebook's influence has become a liability for the company. During the 2016 U.S. presidential election, the Russian government used the Facebook platform to disseminate fake news that more frequently favored Donald Trump over Hillary Clinton. As a social media platform, user-generated content and media created content can be shared vastly within the digital community. This has come with repercussions for Facebook, as they were accused of releasing personally identifiable information of approximately 82 million users to Cambridge Analytica. The Cambridge Analytica Scandal drew much attention to the privacy settings and influence of the Feed on the Facebook platform. The Feed has become a significant contributor to the spread of misinformation; as former U.S. president Barack Obama put it, "misinformation...looks the same when you see it on a Facebook page or you turn on your television."

After the 2016 election, journalist Margaret Sullivan called on Facebook inc. to hire an editor to monitor the News Feed to ensure accuracy and balance of news stories. In late 2016, Facebook described plans to issue warning labels on certain News Feed posts. Facebook has a partnership with fact-checkers like Snopes.com and PolitiFact, and would display that a story is disputed if it has been debunked by one of those fact-checkers.

== Operation ==
On the Facebook app, Feed is the first screen to appear, partially leading most users to think of the feed as Facebook itself.

The Facebook Feed operates as a revolving door of articles, pages the user has liked, status updates, app activity, likes from other users photos and videos. This operates an arena of social discussion. Algorithms are employed on the Facebook platform to curate a personalized experience for users that is predominantly featured in the Feed.

Adam Mosseri is Facebook's vice president in charge of Feed and Chief Product Officer while Chris Cox runs the Facebook app and Feed. On October 1, 2018, it was announced Adam Mosseri would become the head of Instagram.

=== Algorithms ===
Facebook's proprietary recommendation algorithms compare the merits of about 2,000 potential posts every time the app is opened, using a complex system based on providing a meaningful experience, over that of clicks, reactions, or reading time. The Feed has been described as a filter bubble, showing users personalized results about information deemed interesting to them, in contrary to showing all information, even information that they disagree with. Subsequently, the functionality of the Feed has been debated as to whether or not it is an echo-chamber.

Facebook has been researching this situation since 2010, and initially used an algorithm known as EdgeRank. By late 2013, clickbait articles had become significantly prevalent, leading Facebook's chief product officer Chris Cox's team to hire survey panels to assess how Feed was working. As a result, Facebook began adding ever-increasing numbers of data points to its algorithm to significantly reduce clickbait.

== Effect on opinion ==
A 2015 study published in Science concluded that Facebook's algorithms had a minimal effect on the news feed's diversity, though the study prompted academic criticism.

Researchers at the MIT Media Lab Center for Civic Media produced an application called Gobo which allows users to see the results of adjusting the algorithm.

== See also ==
- List of Facebook features
