= EdgeRank =

Facebook algorithm

EdgeRank is the name commonly given to the algorithm that Facebook uses to determine what articles should be displayed in a user's News Feed. As of 2011, Facebook has stopped using the EdgeRank system and uses a machine learning algorithm that, as of 2013, takes more than 100,000 factors into account.

EdgeRank was developed and implemented by Serkan Piantino.

== Formula and factors ==
In 2010, a simplified version of the EdgeRank algorithm was presented as:

$$\sum_{\mathrm{edges\,}e} u_e w_e d_e$$

where:

$u_e$ is user affinity.
$w_e$ is how the content is weighted.
$d_e$ is a time-based decay parameter.

- User Affinity: The User Affinity part of the algorithm in Facebook's EdgeRank looks at the relationship and proximity of the user and the content (post/status update).
- Content Weight: What action was taken by the user on the content.
- Time-Based Decay Parameter: New or old. Newer posts tend to hold a higher place than older posts.

Some of the methods that Facebook uses to adjust the parameters are proprietary and not available to the public.

A study has shown that it is possible to hypothesize a disadvantage of the "like" reaction and advantages of other interactions (e.g., the "haha" reaction or "comments") in content algorithmic ranking on Facebook. The "like" button can decrease the organic reach as a "brake effect of viral reach". The "haha" reaction, "comments" and the "love" reaction could achieve the highest increase in total organic reach.

== Impact ==
EdgeRank and its successors have a broad impact on what users actually see out of what they ostensibly follow: for instance, the selection can produce a filter bubble (if users are exposed to updates which confirm their opinions etc.) or alter people's mood (if users are shown a disproportionate amount of positive or negative updates).

As a result, for Facebook pages, the typical engagement rate is less than 1% (or less than 0.1% for the bigger ones), and organic reach 10% or less for most non-profits.

As a consequence, for pages, it may be nearly impossible to reach any significant audience without paying to promote their content.

== See also ==
- PageRank, the ranking algorithm used by Google's search engine
