= M (virtual assistant) =

Discontinued virtual assistant by Facebook

- Developer: Facebook, Inc.

M was a virtual assistant by Facebook, first announced in August 2015, that claimed to automatically complete tasks for users, such as purchase items, arrange gift deliveries, reserve restaurant tables, and arrange travels. It was intended to compete with services such as Siri and Cortana. In practice, over 70% of requests were answered by human operators.

== History ==
By April 2017, M was available to a small test audience of 10,000 users. It worked inside the Facebook Messenger instant messaging services.

If a user made a/some request for M, it used algorithms to determine what the user wanted. If M did not understand, a human took over the conversation, unbeknownst to the user.

The project was run by Alex Lebrun, of chatbot startup Wit.ai, which was bought by Facebook. The project began in 2015. In April 2017, the MIT Technology Review called M "successful", although it noted that "M is so smart because it cheats."

In April 2017, Facebook enabled "M Suggestions," based on the pure machine portion of M, for users in the United States. M Suggestions scanned chats for keywords and then suggested relevant actions. For example, a user writing "You owe me $20" to a friend might trigger M Suggestions to enable the user's friend to pay the user via Facebook's payment platform.

In January 2018, Facebook announced that they would be discontinuing M. The company stated that what they learned from M would be applied to other artificial intelligence projects at Facebook. It came out after M's shutdown that no more than 30% of M's answers to requests had ever been served by the AI system; 70% or more were from the humans backing the system.
