= Elliot Schrage =

American lawyer and business executive

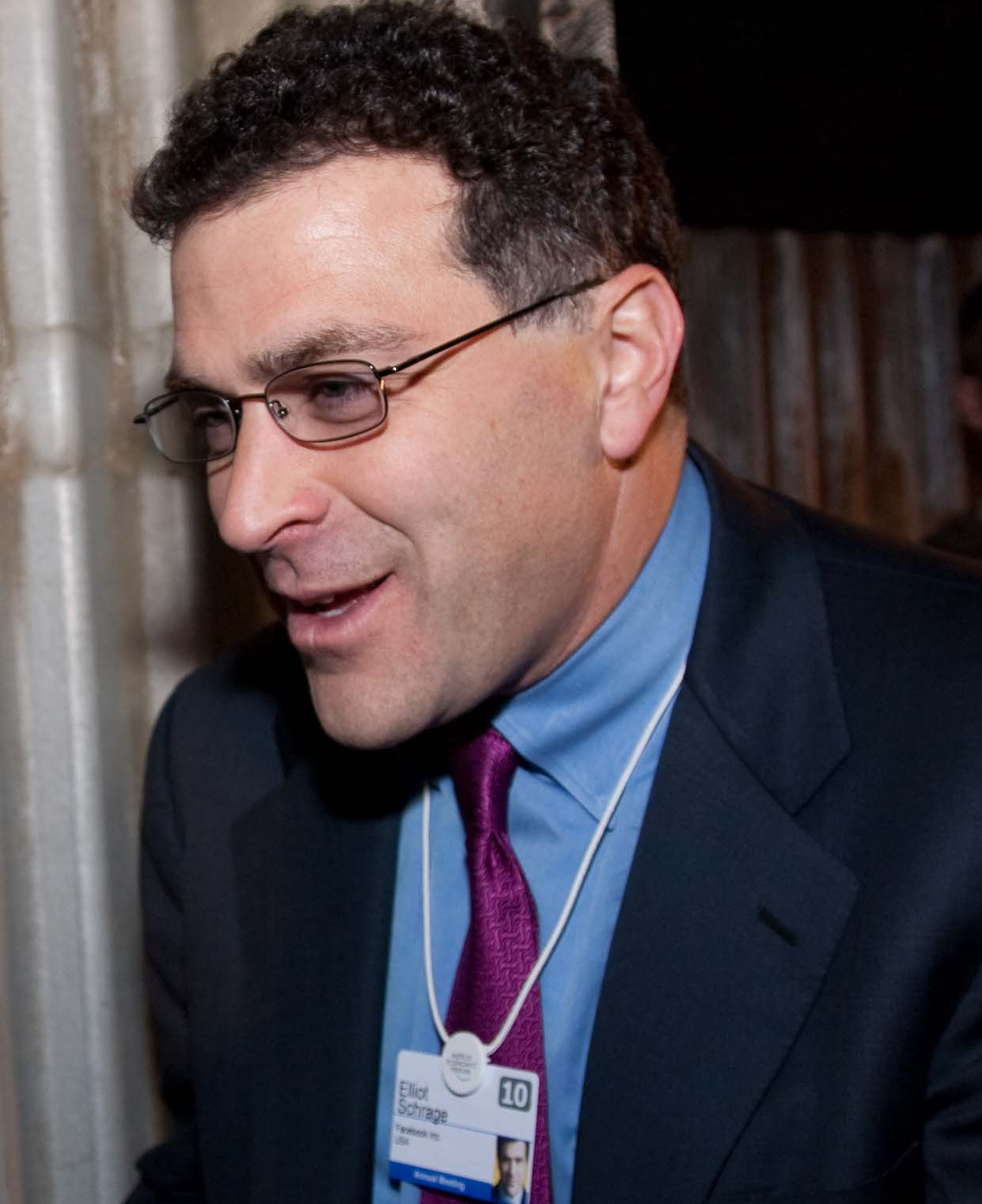
- Schrage, January 2010
- Education: Harvard University (AB, JD, MPP)
- Occupations: Former VP of Communications and Public Policy and VP of Special Projects
- Employer: Facebook

Elliot J. Schrage is an American lawyer and business executive. Until June 2018, he was vice president of global communications, marketing, and public policy at Facebook, where he directed the company's government affairs and public relations efforts. He then served as vice president of special projects at Facebook.

== Life and education ==
Schrage was born to a Jewish family and holds degrees from Harvard Law School (J.D. 1986), the John F. Kennedy School of Government (M.P.P. 1986), and Harvard College (A.B. 1981). He also studied at the École Normale Supérieure in Paris, France.

== Career ==
=== Early career ===
Schrage began his legal career with Sullivan & Cromwell, where he specialized in U.S. securities offerings, mergers and acquisitions, and corporate transactions, including project financing for the Euro Disneyland theme park.

He then worked as managing director of the New York office of Clark & Weinstock, a public policy and management consulting firm. Since 1990, Schrage also served as adjunct professor at Columbia Business School, where he taught a seminar that "explores the intersection of international human rights law and multinational business practices", and Columbia Law School.

Schrage served as the Bernard L. Schwarz Senior Fellow in Business and Foreign Policy at the Council on Foreign Relations and also worked at Gap, Inc., as the senior vice president for global communications.

=== Google ===
On October 31, 2005, it was announced that Schrage had joined Google as vice president, Global Communications and Public Affairs, where he managed communications and public affairs issues around Google's acquisition of YouTube in 2006 as well as DoubleClick in 2007. Upon joining Google, Schrage inherited the company's controversy regarding censoring search results in China. On February 15, 2006, he testified in front of the United States House Committee on International Relations on behalf of Google on the subject of Internet in the People's Republic of China in connection with Google's decision to offer a limited, but transparent, search to enter the Chinese market and compete with Baidu, a more restrictive and non-transparent service.

In 2007, Schrage was instrumental in creating a partnership between the United States Holocaust Memorial Museum and Google Earth team to map evidence of atrocities in the Darfur region of Sudan and raise public awareness of the attempted genocide in the region.

=== Facebook ===
In announcing Schrage's appointment as VP of Global Communications and Public policy in May 2008, Facebook CEO Mark Zuckerberg indicated that Schrage "will direct our efforts to work with users, media, governments and other entities around the world to ensure that Facebook's policies are transparent, responsive, effective and are recognized as being those things".

On May 12, 2010, The New York Times published a Q&A with Schrage, where he answered readers' questions. The interview was panned and negatively rated in the press, with Schrage attracting criticism for his poor handling of Facebook's privacy policies. In 2017, Schrage launched Facebook's "Hard Questions" series to explain Facebook's policies and discuss challenging topics including the company's impact on society. The series, edited by former New York Times public editor Elizabeth Spayd, included more than 40 posts, videos or transcripts with contributions from Facebook executives and other experts, including Toomas Hendrik Ilves. In 2018, Schrage launched Facebook's initiative to open data for independent academic research on social media's influence on elections and democracy. In 2018, it was reported that Schrage tasked a Republican-affiliated PR firm to push negative narratives about Facebook's competitors, namely Apple and Google.

Schrage led Facebook's initiatives to address the impacts of the company's growing size on housing costs and transportation, initially near the company's headquarters and, later, on the San Francisco Bay Area. In 2016, the company announced a partnership with local community groups to support affordable housing, job training and assistance for tenants at risk of losing their homes. Facebook's initial contribution of $20 million unlocked over $75 million of additional resources to finance affordable housing. In 2019, Schrage led Facebook's announcement of a $1 billion 10-year investment in affordable housing and permanent support housing for the homeless across California.

"Elliot Schrage at Facebook is as important to the success of that company as any of their marketers or engineers because again, without his ability to play in DC and Brussels, etc., they're going to be constrained."

— Richard Edelman, President and CEO of Edelman

On June 14, 2018, he announced his intention to resign from his position at Facebook. Schrage was succeeded by former British Deputy Prime Minister and leader of the Liberal Democrats Nick Clegg.

==== Workplace conduct allegations ====
In her 2025 memoir Careless People, former Meta executive Sarah Wynn-Williams wrote that Schrage did not support her efforts to prevent and address sexual harassment by her manager, Joel Kaplan. Wynn-Williams wrote that Kaplan pressured her to continue working during her maternity leave, even after serious complications left her hospitalized, and made repeated sexually charged remarks, as well as engaging in inappropriate physical contact at a company event. She further wrote that after Facebook’s internal investigation found no wrongdoing, Schrage conducted her subsequent performance review in place of Kaplan and terminated her employment, accompanied by Facebook’s chief employment lawyer. According to Schrage, the decision was based on what he described as repeated performance issues, including indecision, shifting priorities, and being unresponsive to leadership communications and hiring concerns. Wynn-Williams also wrote that Schrage later accepted responsibility for Facebook's decision to hire an opposition research firm that targeted critics of the company.

== Human rights advocacy ==
Schrage worked for such groups as Human Rights First, Human Rights Watch and the Robert F. Kennedy Memorial. Schrage helped to create, and co-taught, the first stand-alone course dedicated to exploring the human rights responsibilities of global business at Columbia Business School in the early 1990s. Later, the course was also offered at Columbia Law School and the School of International Public Affairs. Schrage advised various international corporations and trade associations, assisting them in developing corporate "codes of conduct" on human rights. Alongside the development of mechanisms to monitor human rights compliance, he assisted these bodies in evaluating the efficacy of their monitoring programs. In 1992–93, Schrage created and served as the first director of the Liaison Office on Human Rights and Environment for The Lawyers Committee for Human Rights (now Human Rights First), one of the first programs to investigate connections between the growing US movement for environmental justice and international human rights obligations. In 1996, Schrage helped organize a partnership between three organizations; UNICEF, the ILO and Save the Children. The purpose of the partnership was to end child labor in soccer ball production in Pakistan. At that time Pakistan was the source for three of every four balls produced each year. A further project was announced to address the same problems regarding labor and production in India. From 2000 to 2001, Schrage served as Senior Vice President of Global Affairs for Gap Inc. Schrage's position required him to manage the social responsibility initiatives of the company. As part of this role he oversaw engagement programs for company stakeholders, which included various social investors, NGOs and government officials. Furthermore, he was tasked with auditing the working conditions for factory workers who manufactured goods for the Gap, Old Navy and Banana Republic brands, through the set up and direction of a new body for Gap, entitled Gap's Global Compliance Organization. He led study groups on Judging Corporate Liability in the Global Economy, Leveraging the Power of the Privat Sector in the Middle East and North Africa and Beyond the Letter of the Law: The Global Impact of Compliance as a Foreign Policy Tool. His work on the application of the Alien Tort Statute was cited by the U.S. Supreme Court in its analyses of potential liability for multinational corporations for complicity in human rights abuses in the countries where they do business. He also advised the American Apparel Manufacturers Association in developing the Worldwide Responsible Apparel Production (WRAP) Certification Program, a global program to certify apparel factories that comply with human rights standards.

Schrage has served on the American Association for the Advancement of Science's Committee on Scientific Freedom and Human Rights, and the U.S. Department of Treasury Advisory Committee on International Child Labor Enforcement and is a life member of the Council on Foreign Relations. His board experience includes serving as a trustee of the Harvard Law School Association of New York, Director of the International League for Human Rights, and the Director of the Medicare Beneficiaries Defense Fund (now Medicare Rights Center). He was twice appointed by President Obama to serve as Trustee of the United States Holocaust Memorial Museum.

== Other activities ==
- The Flywheel Fund for Career Choice, chairman
- San Francisco-Marin Food Bank, board of directors
- The Institute for Quantitative Social Science (IQSS), Harvard University, policy fellow
- Education SuperHighway, board member

== Personal life ==
Schrage, his wife, and his children reside in San Francisco, California.

== Selected publications ==
- Paper Laws, Steel Bayonets: Breakdown of the Rule of Law in Haiti, Human Rights First, 1990. ISBN 9780934143387
- A Long Way to Find Justice: What Are Burmese Villagers Doing in a California Court?, The Washington Post, 2002.
