= Susan Li (business executive) =

American business executive (born 1986)

- Born: 1986 (age 39–40); Chengdu, China
- Education: Stanford University (BA, BS)
- Occupations: Financial analyst, business executive
- Organization: CFO of Meta (since 2022)
- Known for: Chief Financial Officer of Meta (company)

Susan Li (born 1986) is an American financial analyst and business executive who has served as the chief financial officer of Meta since 2022. She previously served as Meta's vice president of finance. Li was ranked as 41st on the Fortune Most Powerful Women In Business in 2025 and as 41th on the Forbes list of the World's 100 Most Powerful Women in 2025.

== Early life and education ==
Li was born in Chengdu, China, and immigrated to the United States at the age of 2. She spent much of her childhood in the suburb of Lake Oswego, Oregon, right near Portland, Oregon, where her father was a professor. She started high school at 11, and attended Stanford University at 15, where she studied Economics and Mathematical and Computational Sciences.

== Career ==
She started working at Morgan Stanley at 19, on the trading floor, after she graduated, becoming one of the youngest employees. She moved to the company then called Facebook not long after, in 2008, in its early days.

Soon, she helped to lead the Facebook IPO before becoming Vice President of Finance in 2016. During that time, she listed both of Meta's CFOs, David Ebersman and David Wehner, as mentors. In November 2022, she was selected as CFO.

As CFO, Meta massively increased spending related to AI and cut spending on the Metaverse in favor of AI. She has also been a major player in Reality Labs's pivot to Wearables, though she has clarified that VR is still an area of interest.

In 2025, she also clarified Mark Zuckerberg's pledge to invest $600 billion in the US as being the "total envelope", including employees, offices, and all other U.S.-based activities.

Since 2024, Li has served on the board of directors of the biomedical research non-profit Arc Institute.

== Recognition ==
She was listed as #41 in the Forbes list of the World's 100 Most Powerful Women of 2025 and as #41 on the Fortune list of the 100 Most Powerful Women in Business in 2025.
