= Javier Oliván =

Spanish business executive (born 1977)

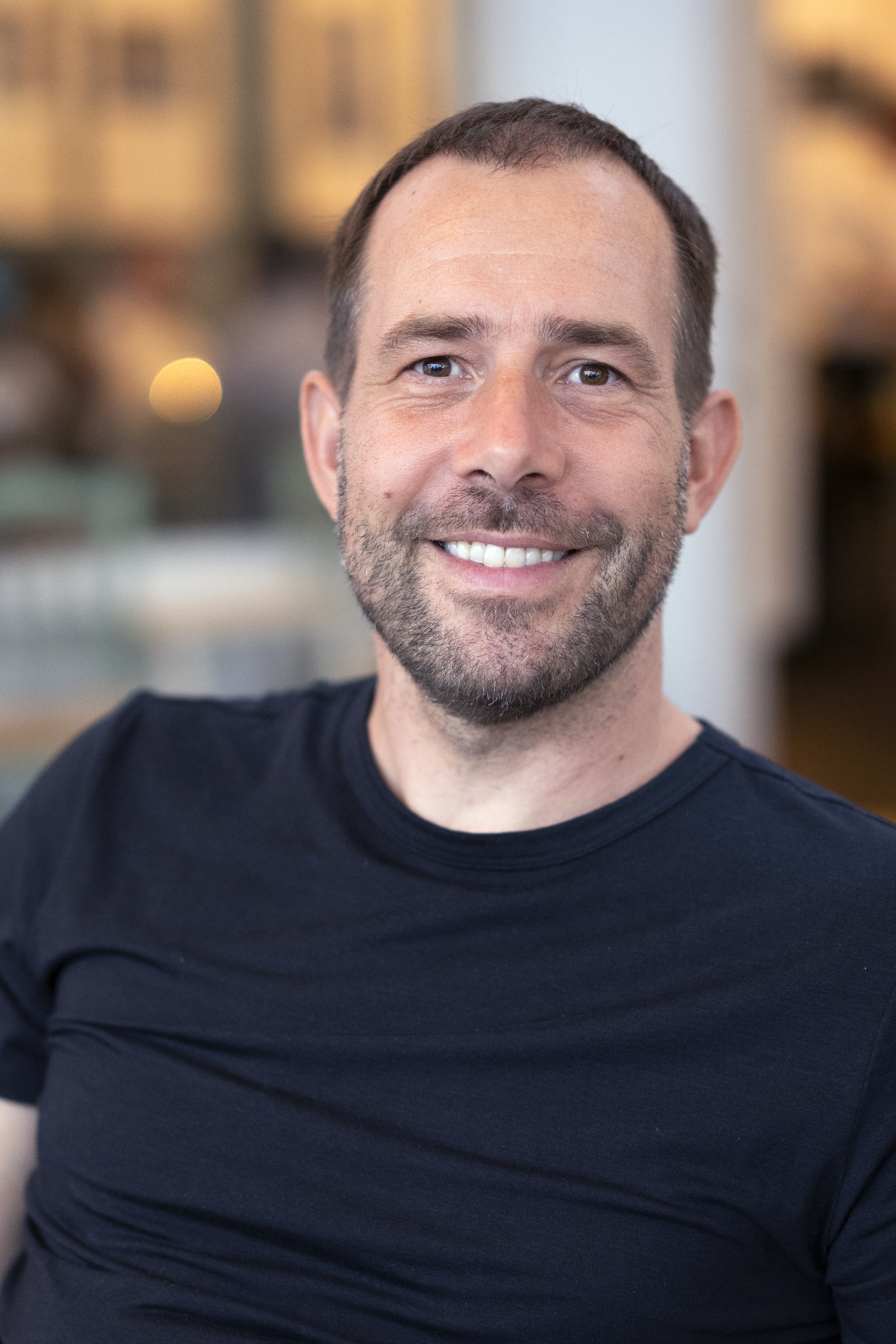
- Oliván in 2022
- Born: Javier Oliván López; 1977 (age 48–49); Sabiñánigo, Spain
- Education: University of Navarra; Stanford University (MBA)
- Occupation: Business executive
- Known for: COO of Meta Platforms
- Board member of: Endeavor Global
- Children: 2

Javier Oliván López (born 1977) is a Spanish business executive who has been chief operating officer of Meta Platforms since 2022, having succeeded Sheryl Sandberg.

== Early life and education ==
Oliván was born in 1977 in Sabiñánigo, Huesca, Spain. His father Florián is a retired businessman who ran a hardware store and an arcade, while his mother María Pilar is a retired professor from the Biello Aragón Institute.

Between 1995 and 2002, Oliván studied electrical and industrial engineering at Tecnun, the School of Engineering of the University of Navarra in Pamplona. He then joined Siemens as a research and development engineer in Munich, Germany, where he patented an algorithmic system for digital image processing, before moving to Tokyo, Japan, to work for NTT Data on wireless video technologies. He later worked as product manager at Siemens Mobile where he led a team responsible for mobile device development.

In 2005, he enrolled in the MBA program at Stanford University, where he took a course that analyzed case studies of startups, including Facebook. As a student, along with several friends, he worked on creating a Spanish-language version of Facebook, called Nosuni. Though the project was a failure, Mark Zuckerberg, the founder of Facebook, reached out and asked Oliván to work for him. He accepted the offer after graduating in 2007.

== Career ==
=== Meta Platforms ===
Oliván joined Facebook (now Meta Platforms) in October 2007 as head of international growth under Chamath Palihapitiya. As a founding member of the growth team, he oversaw the company's international expansion—into new markets and languages. From 2011 to 2018, he was vice president of the growth team. He advocated the Internet.org and Facebook Lite initiatives during this period. He advised multiple acquisitions including that of WhatsApp and Onavo. In 2018, he took charge of the trust and safety team to tackle misinformation on its platforms. He was the vice president of Central Products between 2018 and 2022, after which he was promoted to chief growth officer.

In August 2022, Oliván replaced Sheryl Sandberg as chief operating officer after she stepped down 14 years into the role. As part of a reorganization in January 2025, Oliván also oversees the business operations of the Reality Labs division.

=== Other activities ===
He was recognized as a Henry Crown Fellow by the Aspen Institute in 2014. He is on the board of the non-profit, Endeavor Global. Previously, he was a board member of the e-commerce company Mercado Libre for six years. He was also on the board of Vy Global Growth, a special-purpose acquisition company that invested in geospatial imaging firm Satellogic before the SPAC deal completed in 2022.

== Personal life ==
Oliván lived in Palo Alto, California, before moving to Spain and working remotely as of 2023. He is married and has two daughters. He met his wife while he was an Erasmus student in Munich. He is fluent in five languages, including French, German, and Japanese. He is fond of surfing and paragliding.
