= Joshua Bolten =

American lawyer and politician (born 1954)

Josh Bolten
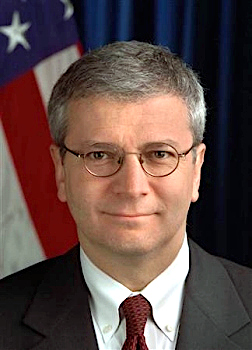

22nd White House Chief of Staff
- In office April 14, 2006 – January 20, 2009
- President: George W. Bush
- Preceded by: Andrew Card
- Succeeded by: Rahm Emanuel

34th Director of the Office of Management and Budget
- In office June 6, 2003 – April 14, 2006
- President: George W. Bush
- Deputy: Joel Kaplan
- Preceded by: Mitch Daniels
- Succeeded by: Rob Portman

White House Deputy Chief of Staff for Policy
- In office January 20, 2001 – June 6, 2003
- President: George W. Bush
- Preceded by: Maria Echaveste
- Succeeded by: Harriet Miers

Personal details
- Born: Joshua Brewster Bolten; August 16, 1954 (age 72)
- Party: Republican
- Spouse: Ann Kelly (m. 2015)
- Education: Princeton University (AB); Stanford University (JD)

Joshua Brewster Bolten (born August 16, 1954) is an American lawyer and politician. Bolten served as the White House chief of staff to U.S. president George W. Bush, replacing Andrew Card on April 14, 2006. Previously, he served as the director of the Office of Management and Budget from 2003 to 2006.

Since 2017, he has been president and CEO of the Business Roundtable.

== Early life and education ==
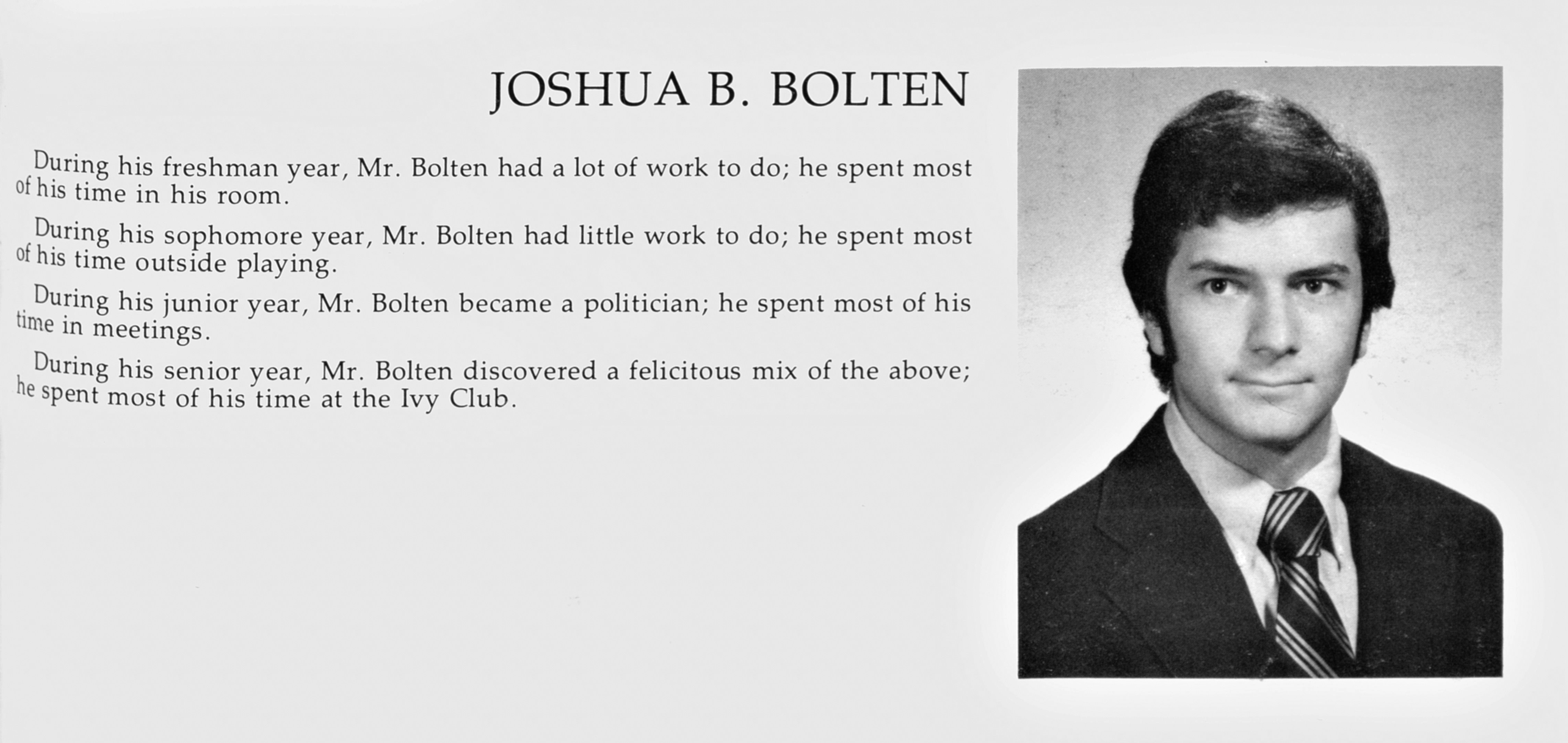
Bolten in the Princeton University yearbook, 1976

Bolten is Jewish, the son of Analouise (née Clissold) and Seymour Bolten. His father worked for the CIA and his mother taught world history at George Washington University. He graduated from St. Albans School, and served on the school's board until 2007.

Bolten attended Princeton University, where he studied in the Woodrow Wilson School of Public and International Affairs and served as class president and president of The Ivy Club. He graduated in 1976. Bolten completed a 152-page long senior thesis titled "Judicial Selection in Virginia." He graduated with a J.D. from Stanford Law School in 1980 and served as an editor of the law review.

== Career ==
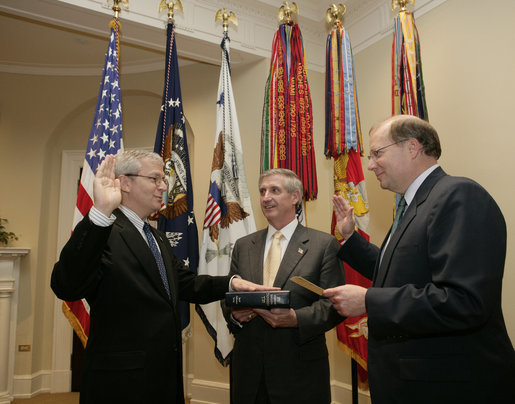
Bolten is sworn in as White House Chief of Staff by his Deputy Joe Hagin; his predecessor Andrew Card looks on.

Under President George H.W. Bush (1989–1993), Bolten was general counsel to the Office of the United States Trade Representative for three years and deputy assistant to the president for legislative affairs for one year.

Bolten was executive director for legal and government Affairs at Goldman Sachs in London from 1994 to 1999. He served as policy director for the 2000 George W. Bush presidential campaign

Under George W. Bush, he served as deputy chief of staff for policy at the White House from 2001 to 2003. Bolten served as director of Office of Management and Budget (OMB) from 2004 until 2006. In 2006, he was appointed as White House chief of staff. He was the second Jewish person to hold that top position (after Ken Duberstein during the Reagan administration, and before Rahm Emanuel in the Obama years).

Bolten served as White House chief of staff from 2006 until 2009. He recruited Henry Paulson—then-CEO of Goldman Sachs—to serve as Treasury Secretary, based on his former employment at the firm. In addition, he recruited Tony Snow to work as White House press secretary, offered Rob Portman the opportunity to succeed him as OMB director, and brought his OMB deputy Joel Kaplan into the White House as deputy chief of staff for policy.

=== Later career ===
Bolten became the John L. Weinberg/Goldman Sachs & Co. Visiting professor at the Princeton School of Public and International Affairs in September 2009, teaching courses on the federal budget and international trade and financial regulation. In March 2010, Bolten was appointed a member of the board and co-chair of the Clinton Bush Haiti Fund, which has raised $36 million to date for immediate earthquake relief and long-term recovery efforts in the Caribbean country.

In July 2011, Bolten co-founded Rock Creek Global Advisors, an international economic and regulatory policy consulting firm, where he served as managing director until 2017.

In January 2017, Bolten was named president and CEO of the Business Roundtable, a conservative lobbying organization. He replaced former Michigan Governor John Engler in the role. He is current serving on the board of trustees of Princeton University.

== Personal life ==
Bolten plays bass guitar in a band called The Compassionates. In 2015, Bolten married Ann Kelly.

Political offices
Preceded by Maria Echaveste	White House Deputy Chief of Staff for Policy; 2001–2003	Succeeded by Harriet Miers
Preceded by Mitch Daniels	Director of the Office of Management and Budget; 2003–2006	Succeeded by Rob Portman
Preceded by Andrew Card	White House Chief of Staff; 2006–2009	Succeeded by Rahm Emanuel
