= Chris Cox (manager) =

American software engineer

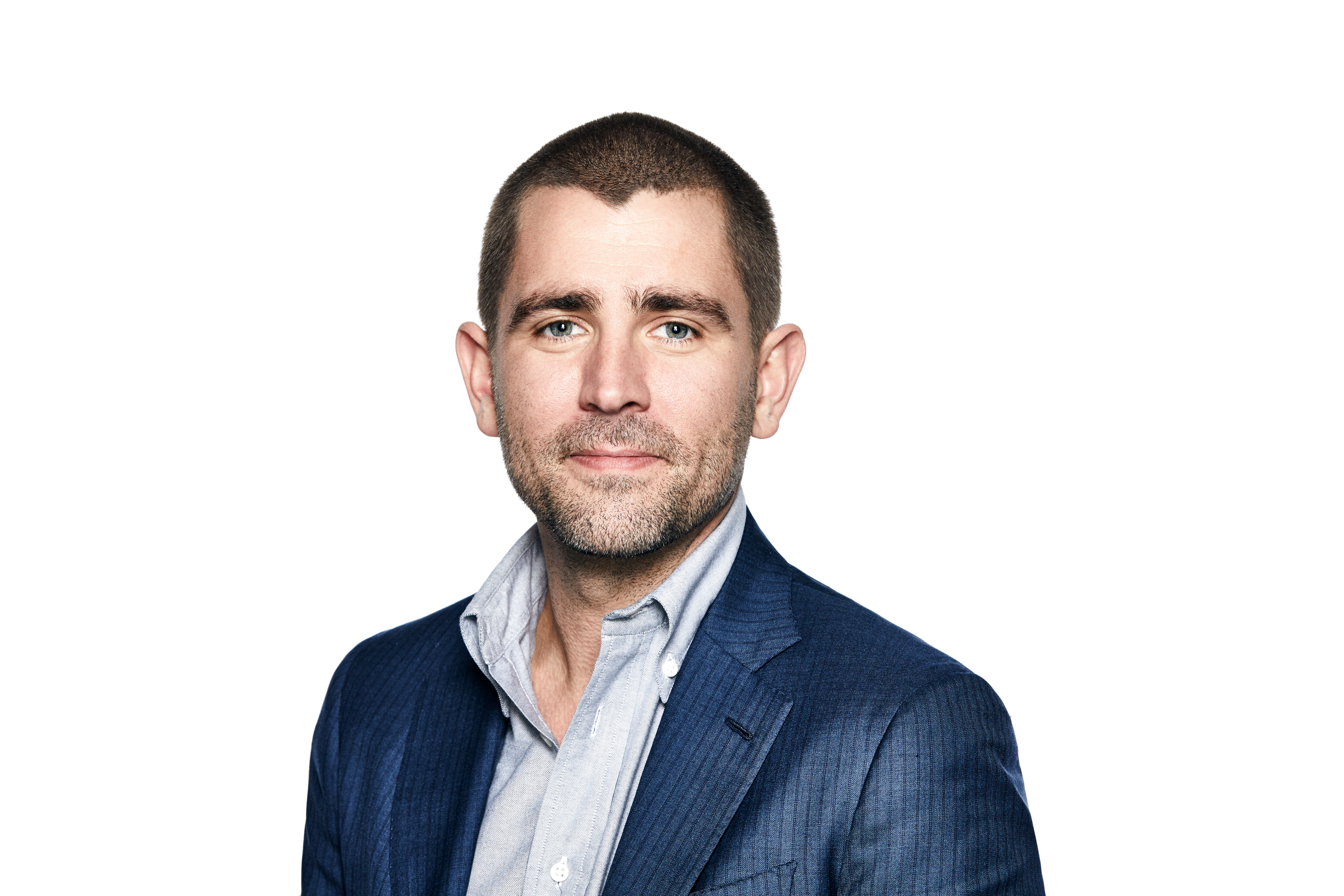
- Born: September 2, 1982 (age 43); Atlanta, Georgia, U.S.
- Education: Stanford University
- Occupation: CPO at Meta Platforms (2014—2019, 2020—)
- Spouse: Visra Vichit-Vadakan (m. 2010)

Christopher Cox is an American software engineer and corporate executive. Cox has been chief product officer at Meta Platforms (formerly Facebook Inc.) since 2020, having previously been in the position from 2014 to 2019. Cox initially joined Facebook in 2005 as one of the company's initial software engineers.

== Early life and education ==
Cox was born in Atlanta, Georgia, and raised in Winnetka, Illinois. He is the youngest of three children. He attended New Trier High School. Cox studied at Stanford University, receiving a bachelor’s degree in symbolic systems with a concentration in artificial intelligence. He later enrolled in a symbolic systems graduate program at Stanford before dropping out to join Facebook in 2005.

== Career ==
Cox joined Facebook in 2005 as one of its first fifteen software engineers and played a role in the development of News Feed. He held various executive roles before being promoted to chief product officer in 2014.

In May 2018, he was put in charge of the company's apps including Facebook, Instagram, WhatsApp, and Messenger.

In March 2019, Cox announced that he was leaving Facebook, after Zuckerberg announced plans for the company to focus on developing encrypted messaging across its applications.

He returned to the company as chief product officer in June 2020. Bloomberg noted that Cox "was one of the first Facebook executives that most employees met as part of their orientation training" prior to his initial resignation.

== Personal life ==
Cox married a fellow Stanford University alum and director Visra Vichit-Vadakan in 2010.

=== Recognition ===
In 2019, he was listed on the Forbes 40 Under 40 list. In 2011, he was included on Fast Company's list of "Most Creative People in Business".
