= Sarah Wynn-Williams =

New Zealand diplomat and former Facebook director

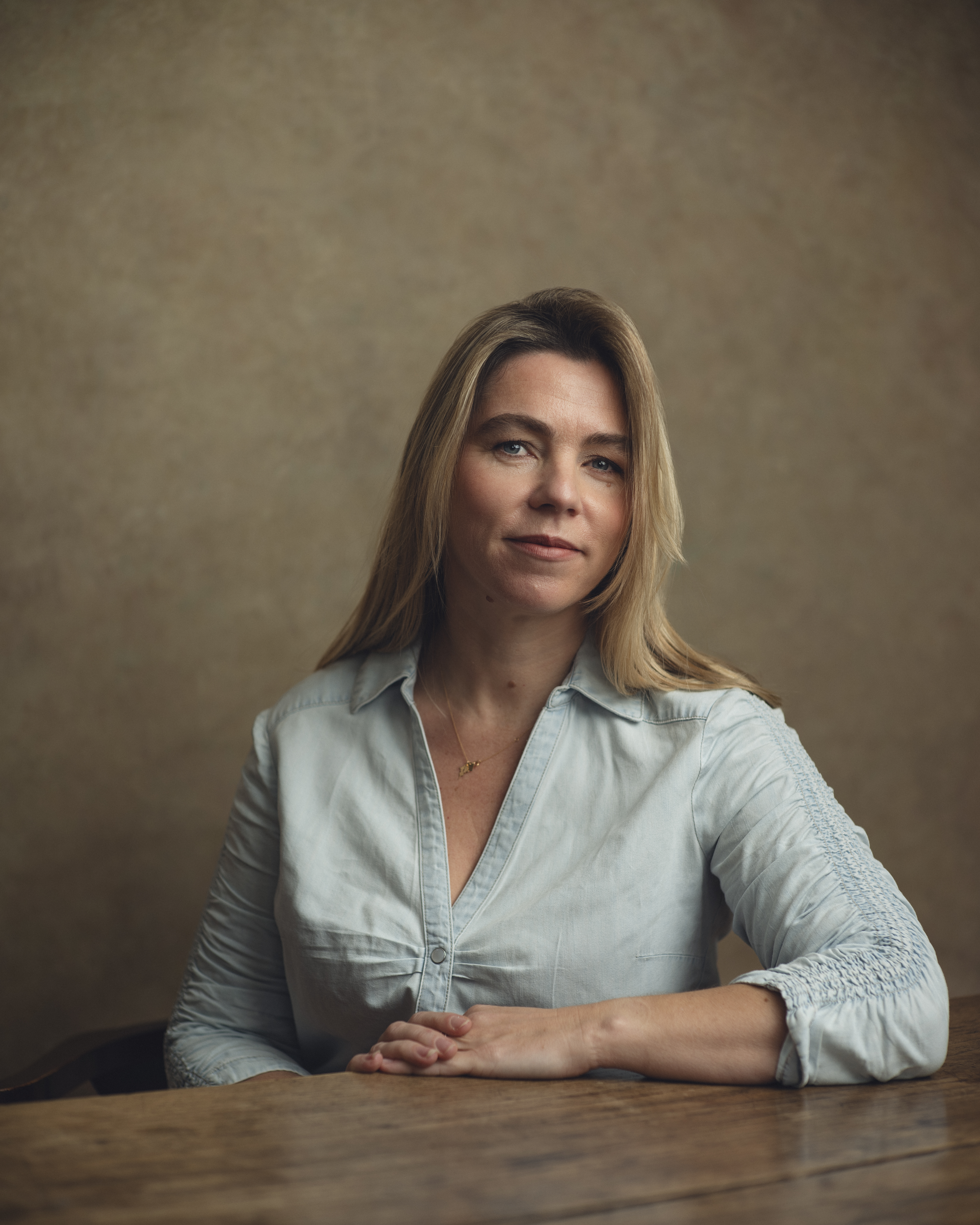
- Wynn-Williams in 2024
- Born: 1979 or 1980 (age 46–47); Christchurch, New Zealand
- Occupations: Lawyer; public policy expert; author
- Years active: 2002–present
- Notable work: Careless People: A Cautionary Tale of Power, Greed, and Lost Idealism
- Children: 3

Sarah Wynn-Williams (born 1979 or 1980) is a New Zealand lawyer, public policy adviser, and author. She was formerly a Director of Public Policy at Facebook. Her book Careless People: A Cautionary Tale of Power, Greed, and Lost Idealism was released in 2025 over Facebook's objections.

== Early life ==
Wynn-Williams grew up in Christchurch. In 1993, she was attacked by a shark as a teenager while on holiday at the Golden Bay Holiday Park in Tukurua (part of Parapara) in Golden Bay / Mohua. She graduated with a B.A. from the University of Canterbury and a M.L. from Victoria University.

== Career ==
Wynn-Williams practised law at the Mallesons, Stephen, Jacques law firm. From 2002 to 2007, she was a policy adviser in the diplomatic service of the New Zealand government. From 2007 to 2011, she managed New Zealand's political affairs and government relations office at its embassy in Washington, D.C. She has also worked for Oxfam International.

Wynn-Williams began working for Facebook in 2011, eventually becoming its global public policy director. Facebook terminated Williams's employment in 2017, allegedly for "poor performance and toxic behavior". Williams has stated she believes this was in retaliation for reporting her boss Joel Kaplan for sexual harassment.

=== Careless People: A Cautionary Tale of Power, Greed, and Lost Idealism ===
In 2025, she released Careless People: A Cautionary Tale of Power, Greed, and Lost Idealism, a book about her career at Facebook.

The book's most significant revelations were an alleged “lethal carelessness” around ethical choices such as that Meta worked with the Chinese Communist Party to spec and build censorship tools that worked with China's Great Firewall, and insights into Mark Zuckerberg's attitudes around international public policy during her tenure.

Facebook threatened legal action and an arbitrator prohibited Wynn-Williams from promoting the book. Facebook is attempting to enforce a non-disparagement agreement. In September 2025, British politician Louise Haigh stated that Meta is attempting to fine Wynn-Williams $50,000 for every breach of the non-disparagement order. Facebook/Meta has argued that the book is "out of date" and does not reflect current practices.

In what has been described as an example of the Streisand effect, Facebook's legal action led to greater publicity and increased book sales.

In their review of the book, The Guardian's Stuart Jeffries said that Wynn-Williams' retelling of her time at Facebook had "cult vibes" and involves strong criticism of internet.org and Facebook's corporate leadership. Sabhanaz Rashid Diya, a former head of public policy for Meta in Bangladesh who did not work for the company at the same time as Wynn-Williams, described the book as "a courageous feat, but it glosses over [Wynn-Williams's] own indifference to warnings from policymakers, civil society, and internal teams outside the U.S. about serious harm to communities from Facebook."

Wynn-Williams testified about Facebook/Meta before the Senate Judiciary Committee on 9 April 2025.

Wynn-Williams was scheduled to take part in a panel at the 2026 Hay Festival, but she remained silent for the entire event, as Meta had secured a legal order preventing her from publicly discussing aspects of the book. Other members of the panel were able to explain the circumstances, and Wynn-Williams received a standing ovation at the end of the event.

In June 2026, Wynn-Williams filed suit against Meta, arguing that the arbitration ruling that prohibited her from publicising Careless People was "improper and unlawful" and a violation of her First Amendment rights. The complaint argued Wynn-Williams signed the severance agreement under financial duress, making it unenforceable, and alleged that Meta had conducted an invasive surveillance campaign against her.

== Personal life ==
Wynn-Williams is married to a journalist. She has three children.

== Works ==
- Wynn-Williams, Sarah (2025). Careless People: A Cautionary Tale of Power, Greed, and Lost Idealism. New York: Flatiron Books. ISBN 978-1-250-39123-0. OCLC 1504756807.

== See also ==
- Criticism of Facebook
- Lean In
