= David Wehner =

American corporate executive

David M. Wehner
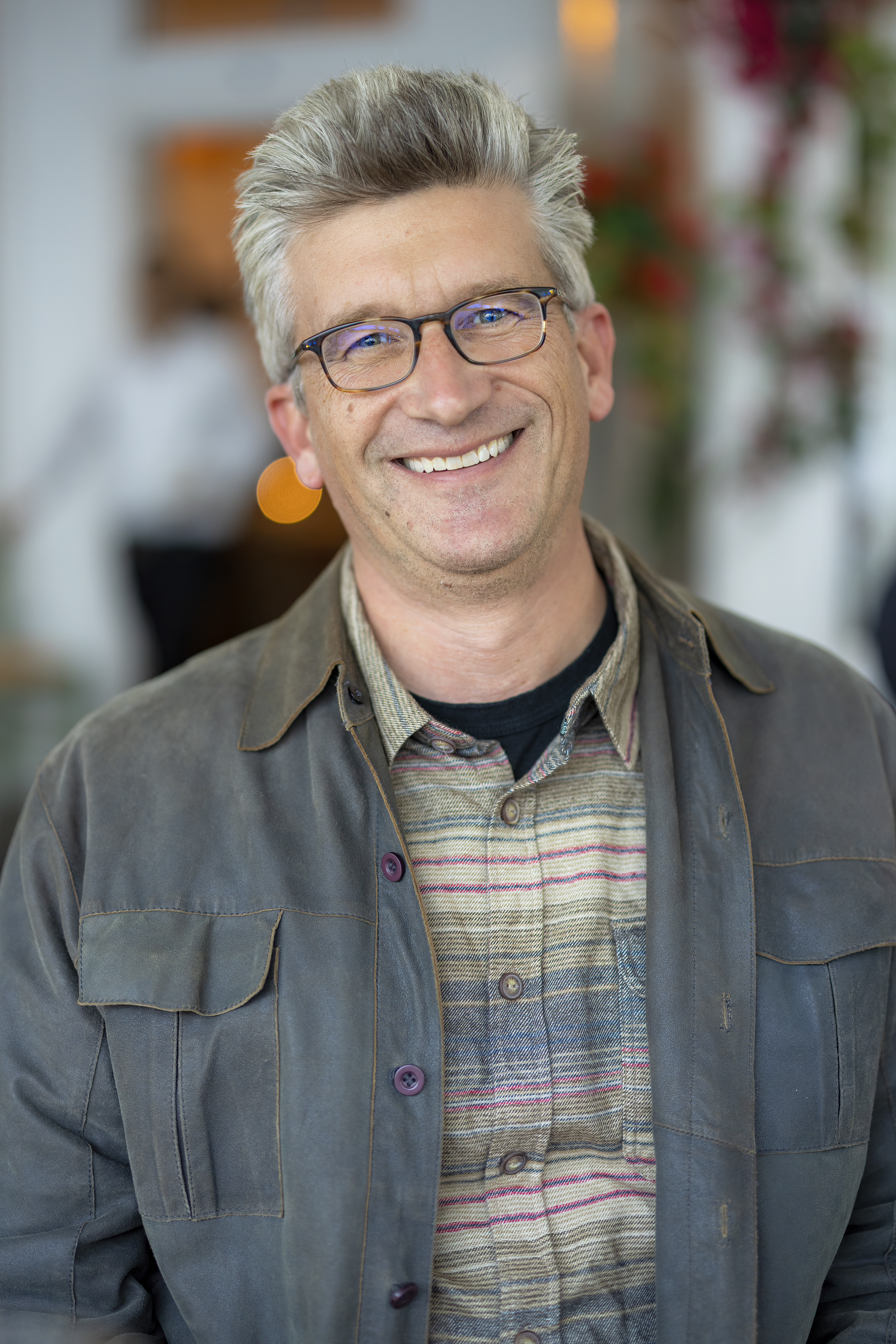
- Wehner (2022)
- Education: Georgetown University (BS); Stanford University (MS)
- Occupation: CSO of Meta Platforms

David M. Wehner is an American business executive who is the chief strategy officer (CSO) of Meta Platforms (known until 2021 as Facebook, Inc.).

== Education ==
Wehner attended Saint Louis Priory School and graduated in 1986. Wehner graduated from Georgetown University with a BS in Chemistry, where he was an editor for The Hoya. He graduated from Stanford University with an MS in Applied Physics, where he was a National Science Foundation fellow.

== Career ==
Early in his career, Wehner worked at Monitor Group and Hambrecht & Quist. Wehner worked at Allen & Company for nearly a decade until 2010, when he became the CFO of Zynga. At these firms, he held series 7 and series 24 licenses.

Wehner joined Facebook in 2011 as VP of Corporate Finance and Business Planning. Wehner succeeded David Ebersman as CFO of Facebook, Inc. (now known as Meta Platforms) on June 1, 2014.
