= Joel Kaplan =

American political advisor and lobbyist

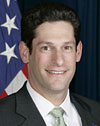

White House Deputy Chief of Staff for Policy
- In office April 20, 2006 – January 20, 2009
- President: George W. Bush
- Preceded by: Karl Rove
- Succeeded by: Mona Sutphen

Personal details
- Born: Joel David Kaplan; 1969 (age 56–57) Weston, Massachusetts, U.S.
- Party: Democratic (until late 1990s); Republican (late 1990s–present)
- Spouse: Laura Cox (m. 2006)
- Education: Harvard University (BA, JD)

Military service
- Allegiance: United States
- Branch/service: United States Marine Corps
- Years of service: 1991–1995

Joel David Kaplan (born 1969) is an American political advisor, lobbyist, and attorney. In January 2025, Kaplan was announced as president of global affairs of Meta Platforms, owner of Facebook, succeeding Nick Clegg. He was previously the company's vice president of global public policy since 2014.

A longtime Republican political operative, Kaplan served eight years in the George W. Bush administration, including as White House Deputy Chief of Staff for Policy.

Within Facebook, Kaplan has been described as a strong conservative voice. He has helped place conservatives in key positions in the company, and advocated for the interests of right-wing websites Breitbart News and The Daily Caller within the company. He has successfully advocated for changes in Facebook's algorithm to promote the interests of right-wing publications and successfully prevented Facebook from closing down groups that were alleged to have circulated fake news, arguing that doing so would disproportionately target conservatives.

== Early life and education ==
Joel David Kaplan was born in 1969, and raised in Weston, Massachusetts, the third child of his father, an attorney for municipal unions, and his mother, a college administrator (both reportedly liberal Democrats). He attended Harvard University, briefly dating his future Meta colleague, Sheryl Sandberg in his first year, and became active as a Student Democrat, including championing desegregated student housing. He graduated with a Bachelor of Arts from Harvard in 1991. According to a friend of Kaplan's at Harvard, campus demonstrations there opposing the U.S. invasion of Kuwait during the Gulf War—which included wearing gas masks, and chanting Vietnam-era slogans—"left many students cold"; Benjamin Woffard, writing for Wired Magazine, associates those events with a shift in Kaplan's politics, noting that by the end of end of his senior year, he had omitted activities with the Democrats from his yearbook entry.

After college, he served as an Artillery Officer in the United States Marine Corps for four years. He then earned a Juris Doctor from Harvard Law School in 1998.

== Career ==
=== Clerkship, entries into politics ===
Kaplan participated as a Democrat during his college years, including successful election at local party caucus as an alternative delegate, and has been described as being an active conservative Democrat during the early-1990s. After law school, he clerked for Judge J. Michael Luttig of the Fourth Circuit Court of Appeals, and Justice Antonin Scalia of the Supreme Court. He registered as a Republican in the late-1990s.

Kaplan worked as a policy advisor on George W. Bush's 2000 presidential campaign, during which he was a participant in the Brooks Brothers riot on November 22, 2000.

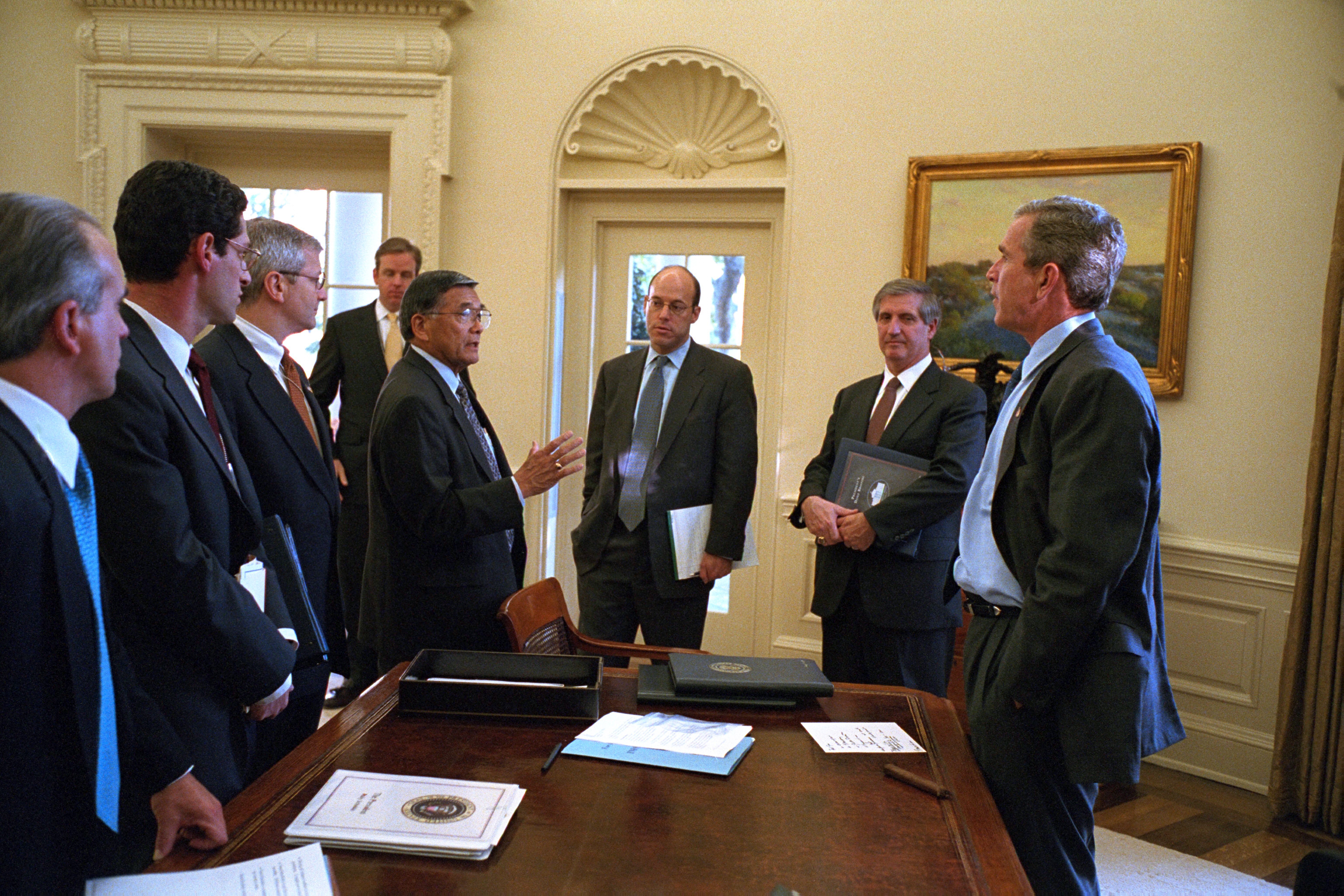
President George W. Bush meets with Kaplan and other officials in the Oval Office in 2001.

From 2001 to 2003 he was special assistant to the president for policy within the White House Chief of Staff’s office. Then he served as deputy director of the Office of Management And Budget, serving under Joshua Bolten. While at the OMB, in 2006, Kaplan said the administration would cut the deficit by half by 2009.

In April 2006, he returned to the White House as the White House Deputy Chief of Staff for policy, taking over policy planning duties from Karl Rove as part of a staff shake-up by White House Chief of Staff Josh Bolten. Blake Gottesman was the other Deputy Chief of Staff and focused on operations. He was responsible for the development and implementation of the Administration’s policy agenda. While in the Bush administration, Kaplan was seen as very close to Bolten.

=== Meta (Facebook) ===
Prior to joining Facebook, Kaplan was the executive vice president for public policy and external affairs for Energy Future Holdings (EFH), where he oversaw company-wide public affairs and led EFH’s efforts to "publicly demonstrate and communicate its role in the energy industry".

In May 2011, Facebook hired Kaplan as its vice president of U.S. public policy, as part of a Facebook's effort to "strengthen" the company's ties to Republican lawmakers on Capitol Hill. In October 2014, Kaplan succeeded Marne Levine as Facebook's vice president of global public policy.

Within the company, Kaplan advocated against restrictions on racially incendiary speech. He played an important role in crafting an exception for newsworthy political discourse when deciding on whether content violated the community guidelines. During the 2016 election, Kaplan advocated against closing down Facebook groups which allegedly peddled fake news. Kaplan argued that getting rid of the groups would have disproportionately targeted conservatives. During and after the 2016 US presidential election, Kaplan argued against Facebook publicly disclosing the extent of Russian influence operations on the platform.

In 2017, after Facebook had implemented changes to its algorithm to expose users to more content by family and friends and less by publishers who were determined by Facebook to engage in misinformation, Kaplan questioned whether the algorithm disproportionately hurt conservative publishers and successfully advocated for Facebook to change the algorithm again.

He pushed against a proposed Facebook project that was intended to make Facebook users of different political views engage with each other in less hostile ways. Kaplan argued that this feature would lead conservatives to accuse Facebook of bias. Kaplan also reportedly advocated on behalf of Breitbart News and The Daily Caller within Facebook. Kaplan has helped to place conservatives in key positions in the leadership of Facebook.

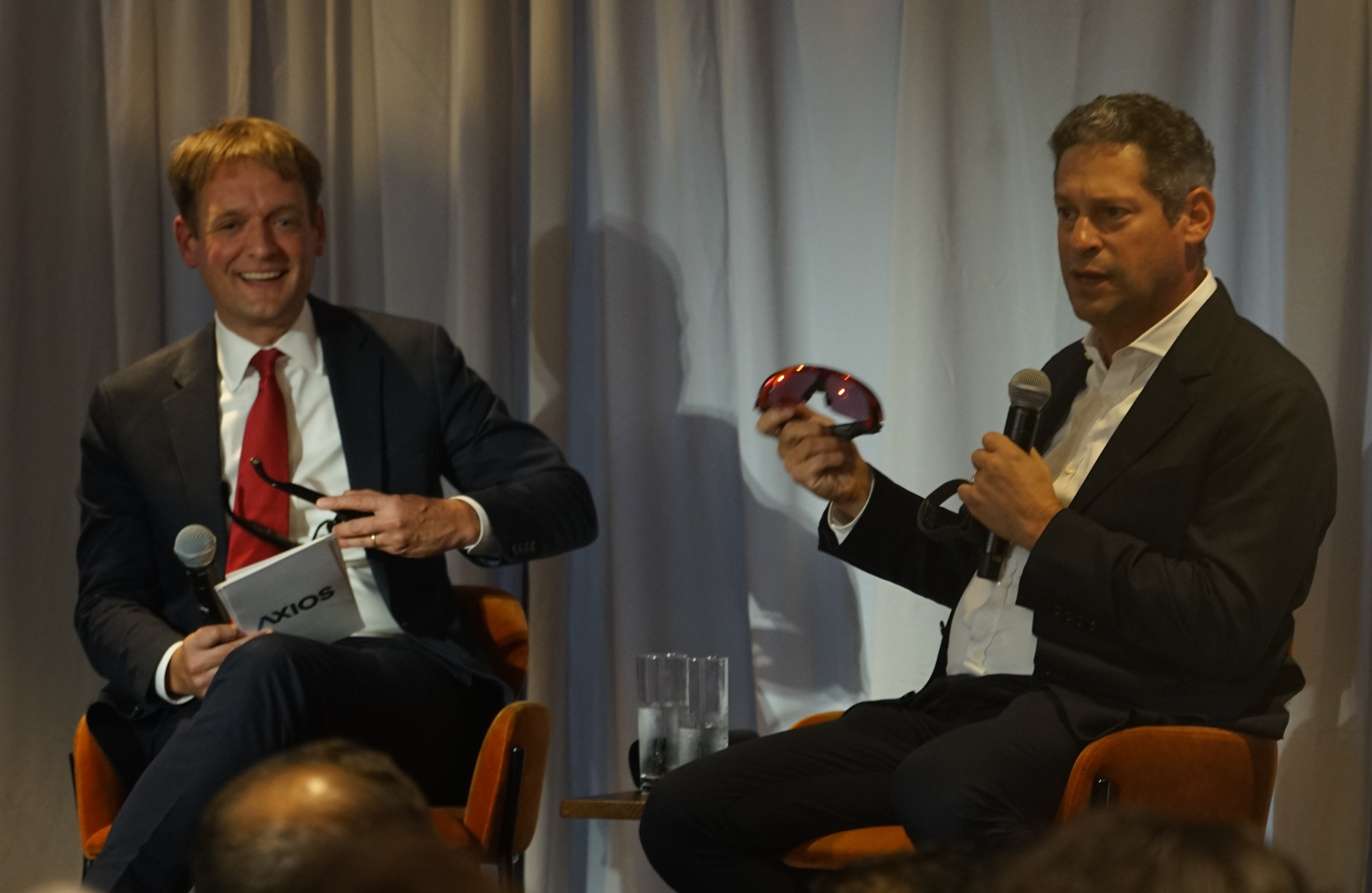
Nicholas Johnston, Kaplan with Meta smartglasses in 2025

In 2018, he advocated strongly for the Supreme Court nomination of Brett Kavanaugh. Kaplan sat behind Kavanaugh during his Senate confirmation hearings. Kaplan hosted a party for Kavanaugh following his nomination to the Supreme Court.

During the first presidency of Donald Trump Kaplan was on friendly terms with the administration. At one point, the administration considered nominating him as head of the Office of Management and Budget.

In January 2025, Kaplan was promoted to the position of president of global affairs at Meta, succeeding Nick Clegg. His appointment has been described as part of Meta's efforts to improve its relationship with Donald Trump ahead of his second term in office.

=== Workplace conduct allegations ===
In her 2025 memoir Careless People, Sarah Wynn-Williams, a former Meta executive, wrote that Kaplan pressured her to continue working during her maternity leave despite severe medical complications. According to Wynn-Williams, she was hospitalized during childbirth, entered a coma, and later received criticism from Kaplan for being insufficiently responsive while on leave. She further alleged that following her childbirth complications, Kaplan pressed her for intrusive details about her postpartum bleeding, reportedly asking repeatedly, "Where are you bleeding from?" and asked inappropriate questions regarding breastfeeding and her use of a breast pump. Wynn-Williams also alleged that Kaplan made repeated sexually charged remarks and sexually assaulted her at a company party. In response, Meta stated that an internal investigation had cleared Kaplan and described Wynn-Williams's claims as "misleading and unfounded allegations of harassment".

In her memoir, Wynn-Williams also wrote that she faced retaliation after reporting Kaplan internally and was fired by the company in 2017. Meta disputed that account, stating that Wynn-Williams was terminated for performance-related reasons and that she was unreliable. In May 2025, U.S. Senator Chuck Grassley announced that he was seeking information from Meta regarding its handling of the allegations and its treatment of Wynn-Williams as a potential whistleblower.

== Personal life ==
On April 8, 2006, Kaplan married Laura Lyn Cox in Washington, D.C. The Kaplan and Kavanaugh families share a close relationship, and Kaplan's wife has previously stated that "[w]e share our families." Kaplan and his wife appeared behind Kavanaugh at the latter's Supreme Court confirmation hearing to show support and solidarity after survivor Dr. Christine Blasey Ford testified about Kavanaugh sexually assaulting her when both were teens. Kaplan and his wife later threw a party at their home to celebrate Kavanaugh's confirmation.

== See also ==
- List of law clerks for the ninth seat of the Supreme Court of the United States
