= Careless People =

2025 memoir by Sarah Wynn-Williams

Careless People: A Cautionary Tale of Power, Greed, and Lost Idealism
- First edition cover
- Author: Sarah Wynn-Williams
- Language: English
- Genre: Whistleblowing
- Publisher: Flatiron Books
- Publication date: March 2025
- Publication place: United States
- Pages: 382 (first edition)
- ISBN: 978-125039123-0
- OCLC: 1504756807

Careless People: A Cautionary Tale of Power, Greed, and Lost Idealism is a memoir by Sarah Wynn-Williams, a former director of public policy at Facebook (renamed Meta), published on March 11, 2025. The book is a critical account of Facebook's internal culture and decision-making practices during Wynn-Williams' time there. The book is highly critical of Facebook's responses to global sociopolitical events, including its role in the Rohingya genocide and CEO Mark Zuckerberg's alleged efforts to censor on behalf of the Chinese government. Additionally, Wynn-Williams accuses several Facebook executives, including Sheryl Sandberg and Joel Kaplan, of engaging in harmful behavior in the workplace, including sexual harassment.

The book gained media coverage following reports that Meta sued to prevent Wynn-Williams from promoting the book; public backlash against Meta's response has been credited with boosting sales of the book, a result known as the Streisand effect. By late March 2025, Careless People had reached number one on the New York Times best-seller list. Following the book's publication, Wynn-Williams was invited to testify before the U.S. Senate, where she accused Zuckerberg of having been willing to censor content in order to gain access to the Chinese market. The title of the book is a quotation from F. Scott Fitzgerald's 1925 novel The Great Gatsby. (Note: The larger quotation which serves as the book's epigraph is: "They were careless people, Tom and Daisy—they smashed up things and creatures and then retreated back into their money or their vast carelessness, or whatever it was that kept them together, and let other people clean up the mess they had made.")

== Background ==
Sarah Wynn-Williams is a former Facebook executive who worked in global policy and government relations. A lawyer and diplomat born in New Zealand, she worked at the company from 2011 until she was terminated in 2017.

=== Pre-publication developments ===
Before publishing Careless People, Wynn-Williams lodged a 78‑page complaint with the US Securities and Exchange Commission (SEC) in which she accused the company of misleading investors. Wynn-Williams also briefed The Washington Post, recorded an interview with journalist Emily Maitlis, and appeared on a podcast with Steve Bannon.

== Content ==
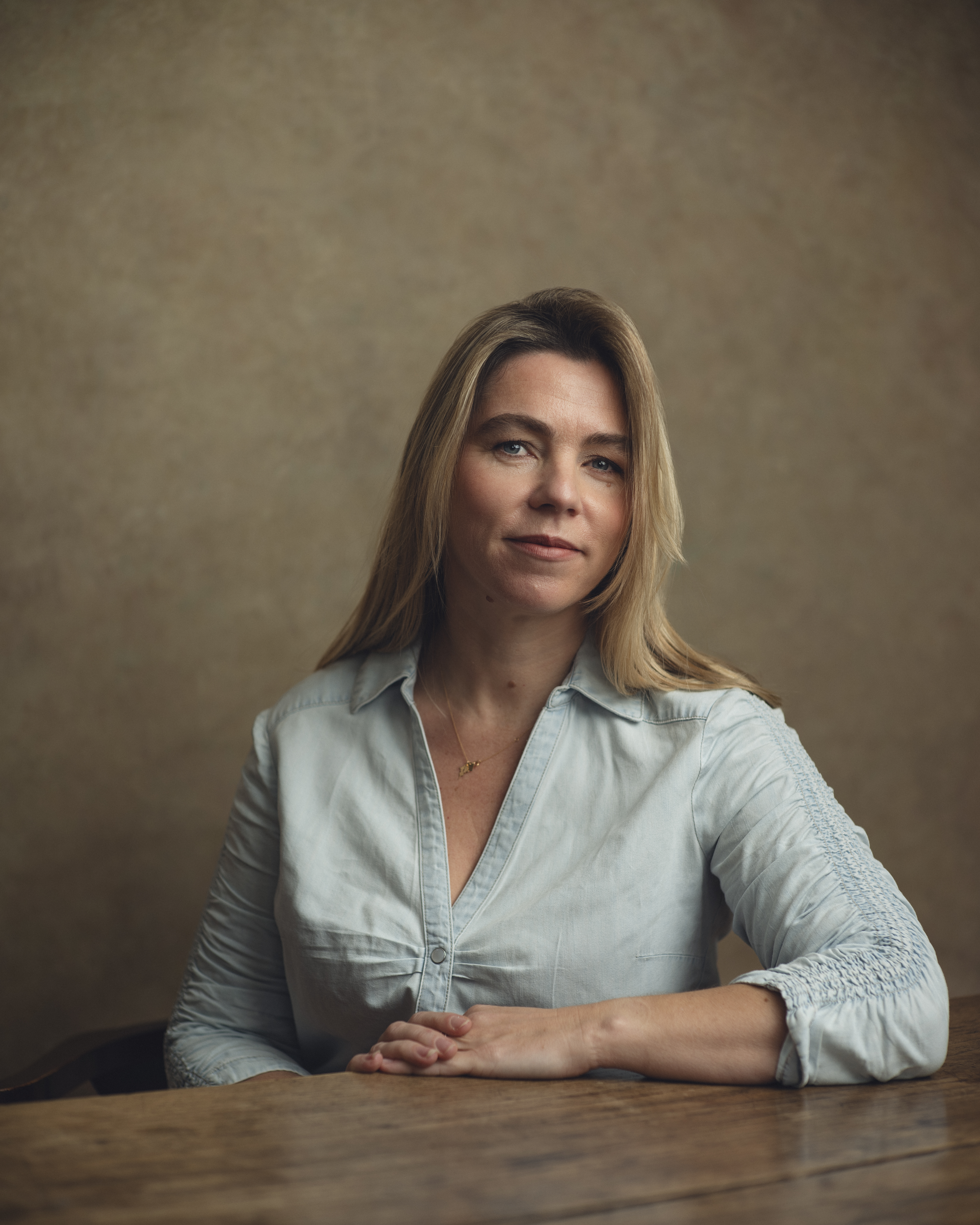
Wynn-Williams in 2024

In Careless People, Wynn-Williams provides an account of her time at the company, discussing its approach to corporate ethics, public policy, and business strategy.

=== Internal guidelines on content moderation ===
Wynn-Williams alleged that, contrary to publicly announced community guidelines, Facebook's internal policy on content moderation established in February 2015 states that

When governments ask us to take down content that we believe should not come down, he [Joel Kaplan quoting his understanding of Mark Zuckerberg] says, it will only be taken down if one of two criteria is met:

1. There is a credible threat to block Facebook.
2. There is a risk to employees.

=== China censorship allegations ===
The book and the SEC filing document attempts by Mark Zuckerberg to gain dominance in China. Wynn-Williams alleged that Facebook developed a system of censorship to appease the Chinese government as it sought to enter the Chinese market which would have subjected users in Hong Kong to censorship. A Facebook privacy staffer in 2014 proposed that "In exchange for the ability to establish operations in China, FB will agree to grant the Chinese government access to Chinese users’ data — including Hong Kong users’ data".

Although Facebook developed these technologies, it eventually decided not to implement them. Academic John Naughton writes that Facebook's efforts included:

developing a censorship system for China in 2015 that would allow a "chief editor" to decide what content to remove, and the ability to shut down the entire site during "social unrest"; assembling a "China team" in 2014 for a project to develop China-compliant versions of Meta's services; considering the weakening of privacy protections for Hong Kong users; building a specialised censorship system for China with automatic detection of restricted terms; and restricting the account of Guo Wengui, a Chinese government critic, after a Chinese internet regulator suggested it would improve cooperation.

Wynn-Williams accuses Zuckerberg of lying to the US Congress about the extent of efforts by Facebook to curry favor with the Chinese government. Wynn-Williams suggests that Facebook was developing technologies and tools to allow the Chinese government to censor users and gain access to their data.

=== Myanmar genocide ===
The military junta in Myanmar was facilitated by Facebook to post hate speech that sought to foment sexual violence and promote genocide against the Rohingya. "Myanmar would have been a better place if Facebook had not arrived", Wynn-Williams writes.

Wynn-Williams argued that Facebook failed to moderate hate speech against the Rohingya in Myanmar, including the use of the racial slur kalar. She noted that the company only had two Burmese-language moderators, both based in Dublin, for the entire country, and claimed that one of the two moderators gave a pass to hate speech while removing pro-human-rights content. She further claimed that she raised concerns that the moderator was "in cahoots with" the junta, only to have her concerns dismissed by the content team. Additionally, she claimed that her efforts to have Facebook's Community Standards rules translated into Burmese were resisted by the company communications team, who told her that "Myanmar isn’t a priority country" in the region.

=== Teen mental health claims ===
Wynn-Williams claims Meta identified teenage girls who had deleted selfies on Facebook, Instagram, and WhatsApp and forwarded their data to companies who used the data to target the girls with advertising for beauty products.

=== Workplace sexual harassment at Facebook ===
The book alleges unaddressed sexual harassment in the workplace by senior Facebook executives, including Sheryl Sandberg and Joel Kaplan, Sandberg reportedly repeatedly encouraged Wynn-Williams to share Sandberg’s bed on a private jet returning from Davos, saying afterwards: "You should have got into bed."

== Reception ==
=== Sales ===
In late March 2025, Careless People was number one on the New York Times best-seller list and was selling well in the United Kingdom, despite legal attempts by Meta to prevent its author from promoting it.

=== Critical response ===
Careless People received coverage from The New York Times, Financial Times, and The Guardian. Some reviews described the book as a detailed insider's account of Big Tech's influence, while others stated that it contained little new information.

Writing for The New York Times, Jennifer Szalai called the book "darkly funny and genuinely shocking: an ugly, detailed portrait of one of the most powerful companies in the world". In a separate opinion piece in The New York Times, Michelle Goldberg wrote, "Hopefully, Meta’s ham-handed attempt at censorship will lead more people to read Wynn-Williams’s book", and argued that the company's reaction undermined the credibility of Zuckerberg's professed support for free speech.

Jason Koebler, a reporter who has covered Meta, wrote in 404 Media that it was "the book about Facebook I've wanted for a decade". Journalist Katie Notopoulos stated in a Business Insider piece that "The most damning moments in the book had already been reported in the news".

Sabhanaz Rashid Diya, Meta's former head of public policy in Bangladesh, praised aspects of the book in her review in Rest of World, but argued that Wynn-Williams did not acknowledge her own complicity in Facebook's behavior during her period there. In her review, Diya called the book "a courageous feat, but it glosses over [Wynn-Williams's] own indifference to warnings from policymakers, civil society, and internal teams outside the U.S. about serious harm to communities from Facebook."

=== Meta ===
Meta describes the book as "a mix of out-of-date and previously reported claims about the company and false accusations about [its] executives".

Mark Zuckerberg responded legally through private arbitration. The American Arbitration Association's emergency arbitrator, Nicholas Gowen, required Wynn-Williams not to make "orally, in writing, or otherwise any disparaging, critical or otherwise detrimental comments to any person or entity concerning [Meta], its officers, directors, or employees". Macmillan, the UK publisher, later issued a statement saying that it would ignore the ruling. Gowen stated that without emergency relief, Meta would suffer "immediate and irreparable loss". Nicholas Gowen did not order any action by the publisher. Hours before an arbitrator barred Wynn-Williams from promoting her book, she was interviewed by Business Insider.

== Impact ==
On April 9, 2025, Wynn-Williams testified before the Senate Judiciary Committee in the hearing "A Time for Truth: Oversight of Meta’s Foreign Relations and Representations to the United States Congress". In her testimony, Wynn-Williams claimed that Facebook leadership worked "hand in glove" with the Chinese government to censor content on its platforms.

In April 2025, the United States Senate Homeland Security Permanent Subcommittee on Investigations cited the book in a probe into Meta Platforms over the company's attempt to enter the People's Republic of China in 2014 in what was internally called "Project Aldrin".

Iowa Senator Chuck Grassley, a Republican who serves as chair of the Senate Judiciary Committee, wrote a letter to Zuckerberg over allegations that the company worked to silence Wynn-Williams, saying, "It’s crucial that Meta ensures its employees can provide protected disclosures without illegal restrictions and bullying".

== See also ==
- Criticism of Facebook
- Sophie Zhang (whistleblower) – American data scientist and whistleblower
- Frances Haugen – American product manager, data scientist and engineer, and whistleblower
- Lean Out: The Struggle for Gender Equality in Tech and Start-up Culture – 2015 book by Elissa Shevinsky
- Microserfs – Novel by Douglas Coupland
- Lean In – 2013 book by Sheryl Sandberg
