= David Ebersman =

American businessman

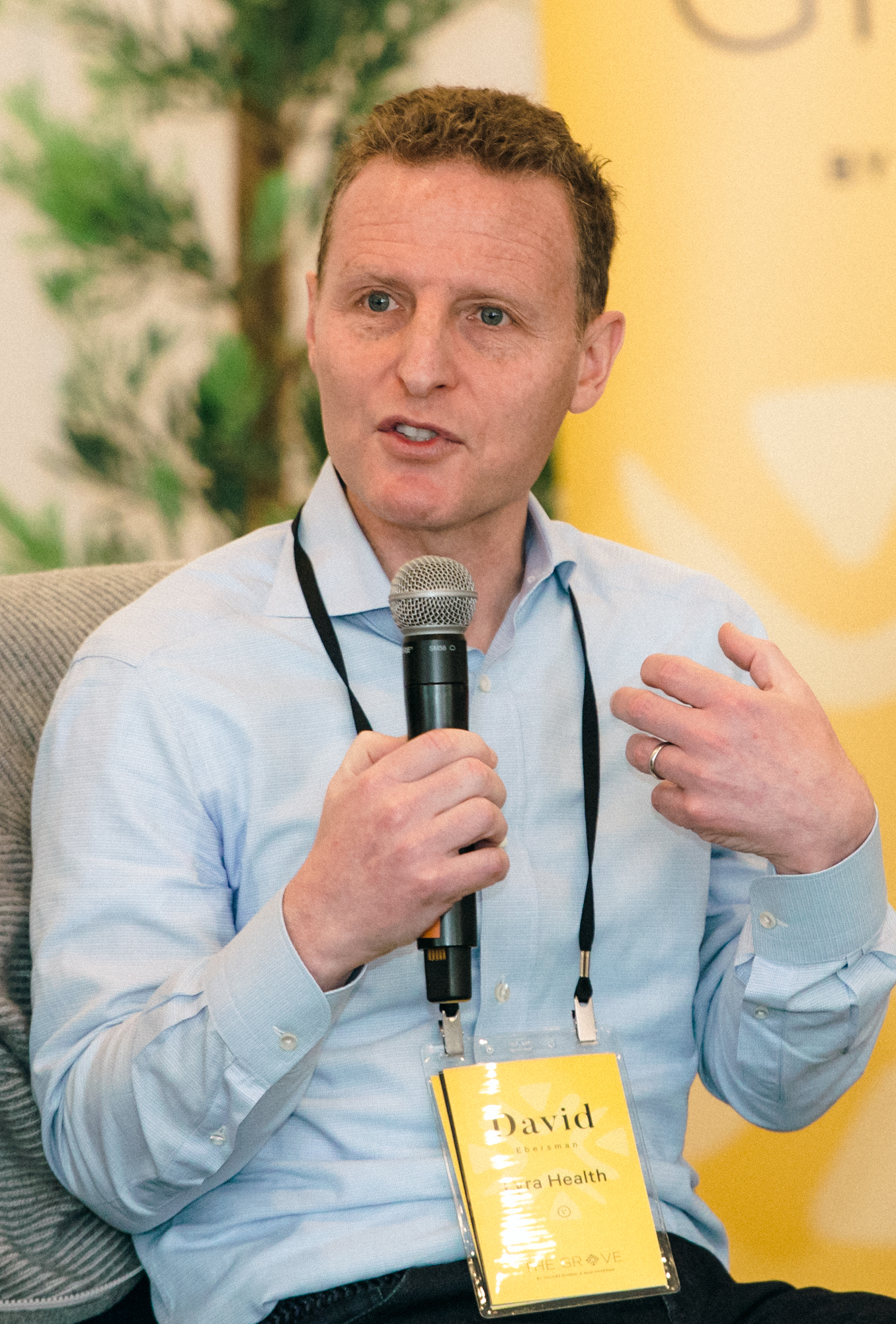
- Ebersman in 2022
- Born: 1969 (age 56–57)
- Education: Brown University

David A. Ebersman (born 1969) is an American businessman and the co-founder and chief executive officer of Lyra Health. He previously served as chief financial officer of Facebook and Genentech. At Facebook, Ebersman orchestrated the largest U.S. Internet IPO of all time and set a record for CFO stock sales.

== Early life ==
David Ebersman was born in 1969. He attended the Trinity School in New York City, graduating in 1987. Ebersman attended Brown University and graduated in June 1991 with an AB in international relations and Economics.

== Career ==
Ebersman began his professional career at Oppenheimer & Co, Inc. in September 1991 as a Research Analyst. Ebersman left Oppenheimer & Co in February 1994 and began working for Genentech. He served as executive vice president and CFO of the company between 2006 and 2009.

=== Facebook ===
In September 2009, Ebersman joined Facebook as the company's chief financial officer, hired in part because he had "public company experience". He oversaw the company's initial public offering on May 18, 2012—then the largest U.S. Internet offering of all time. The IPO proved controversial after the company's market value dropped significantly over the following weeks. In a New York Times article, Andrew Ross Sorkin pointed to Ebersman's culpability for the "catastrophe of an initial public offering," writing "if there is one single individual more responsible than any other for the staggering mispricing of Facebook's I.P.O., it is Mr. Ebersman."

In November 2013, Ebersman set a record for CFO stock sales when he cashed in more than 900,000 shares of Facebook stock worth $42.6 million. He sold $26.2 million more worth of stock in December of that year. Ebersman stepped down from his role at Facebook in June 2014 and was succeeded by David Wehner.

=== Lyra Health ===
In May 2015, Ebersman announced the launch of Lyra Health, a mental health care startup. In 2021, the company was valued at $4.6 billion.

Ebersman serves on the boards of Castlight Health and SurveyMonkey, where he is chairman of the board.
