= List of 2026 films based on actual events =

This is a list of films and miniseries released in 2026 that are based on actual events. All films on this list are from American production unless indicated otherwise.

== 2026 ==
- 58th (2026) – Philippine animated biographical film about the family of Bebot Momay, the 58th victim of the 2009 Maguindanao massacre
- 100 Days (Portuguese: 100 Dias) (2026) – Brazilian action adventure drama film depicting the story of Amyr Klink, who became the first person to cross the south Atlantic in a rowing boat at the age of 29
- A Statement (2026) – biographical comedy drama film centering on a historic conference that took place from October 30–31, 1980 at the Don CeSar Hotel in St. Petersburg, Florida, also known as the "Pink Palace" conference, where a group of scientists and environmentalists gathered to debate evidence of climate change
- Alice (2026) – French-Belgian-Canadian historical miniseries chronicling the life and career of French filmmaker Alice Guy-Blaché, spanning her time in France and her subsequent relocation to the United States
- Angels of War (Russian: Ангелы Ладоги) (2026) – Russian war drama film depicting the heroic deeds of iceboat sailors during the Siege of Leningrad
- Artificial (2026) – biographical comedy drama film about OpenAI CEO Sam Altman and centering on his controversial firing and rehiring in 2023, a movement led by Ilya Sutskever
- The Assassin(s) (Korean: 암살자(들)) (2026) – South Korean crime thriller film following the attempted assassination of Korean president Park Chung-hee on August 15 1974
- Atonement (2026) – drama film about a troubled US marine who seeks to reconcile with the survivors of a family his unit fired on in Iraq in 2003, based on a true story
- Being Heumann (2026) – biographical drama film about disability rights activist Judith Heumann's historic 28-day occupation of San Francisco's Federal Building
- Believe Me (2026) – British crime drama miniseries about the victims of London taxi driver and sex attacker John Worboys and their fight for justice
- The Big Fake (Italian: Il falsario) (2026) – Italian crime drama film loosely based on real life events of the Roman forger and Banda della Magliana affiliate Antonio "Tony" Chichiarelli
- Border 2 (2026) – Indian Hindi-language war drama film based on Operation Chengiz Khan, which sparked the India–Pakistan war of 1971
- The Bose Files: Sach Ya Sazish (Hindi: सच या साजिश) (2026) – Indian Hindi-language historical drama film based on theories and investigations surrounding the disappearance of Indian independence leader Subhas Chandra Bose following the reported 1945 plane crash in Taiwan
- Brazil 70: The Third Star (Portuguese: Brasil 70: A Saga do Tri) (2026) – Brazilian sports drama miniseries depicting the Brazilian national team's victorious campaign to win its third FIFA World Cup title in 1970 in Mexico, set against the political backdrop of Brazil's military dictatorship
- The Brink of War (2026) – historical political drama film depicting the real-life Reykjavík Summit that took place in October 1986
- By Any Means (2026) – historical crime thriller film a young Black FBI agent teams up with notorious New York City mafia hitman, Greg Scarpa, to investigate the murders of civil rights leaders in Mississippi in 1966
- Clean Hands (2026) – biographical crime drama film depicting the true story of hero drug cop turned recovery advocate Kevin Simmers and his daughter Brooke
- Crossing (Mandarin: 四渡) (2026) – Chinese war drama film depicting the Battle of Chishui River, a major campaign during the Long March of the Chinese Workers' and Peasants' Red Army
- Dark Horse (2026) – biographical drama film following the political career of former President of Brazil Jair Bolsonaro during the 2018 presidential election and a subsequent stabbing attack
- Dau (2026) – Russian-German-French historical drama film inspired by the lives of Soviet physicists who developed the atomic bomb
- De Gaulle (French: La Bataille de Gaulle) (2026) – French-Belgian epic biographical drama film depicting Charles de Gaulle's journey during World War II, from his rise as a military leader to his emergence in French politics between 1940-1945
- Dear England (2026) – British biographical drama miniseries about England football manager Gareth Southgate, the pressures of elite sport, and the role of the national men's football team in the national psyche
- Dirty Business (2026) – British drama miniseries portraying a decade-long investigation into sewage contaminated water by Water Companies in Oxfordshire carried out by two neighbours who notice fish in the local Windrush river are dying, and receive help from a sewage plant whistle blower
- Drummer Boy (2026) – historical musical drama film set during the American Revolutionary War, the film follows an American soldier who falls in love with an enslaved woman, as well as following his brother who joins the British Army
- Edjop (2026) – Philippine biographical drama film based on the life of Edgar Jopson, a young man from an affluent family who became an underground activist who confronted President Ferdinand Marcos and his regime
- Ek Hota Malin (Marathi: एक होता मालिन) (2026) – Indian Marathi-language disaster film based on the 2014 Malin landslide which killed at least 151 people
- Elsinore (2026) – British-American biographical drama film about Scottish actor Ian Charleson focusing on his performances as Hamlet at the National Theatre in the final months of his life
- Emperor vs Sarat Chandra (2026) – Indian Bengali-language epic historical drama film depicting Sarat Chandra Chattopadhyay as he fights against the 1927 ban on his novel about a fictional revolutionary who takes on the British colonial government
- Everybody Digs Bill Evans (2026) – British-Irish biographical drama film following legendary musician Bill Evans' journey to overcome grief, following the tragic death of his bass player Scott LaFaro, and his return to music
- Facing El Chapo (Spanish: La captura) (2026) – Mexican crime action thriller film about the manhunt and subsequent recapture of Joaquín "El Chapo" Guzmán
- Fatherland (2026) – Polish-German-Italian-French biographical drama film depicting the story of Erika and Thomas Mann as they embark on a road trip across Germany during the Cold War
- Le Faux Soir (2026) – Belgian-French historical drama film depicting the activities of the Belgian resistance during World War II
- La fiera (2026) – Spanish biographical drama film based on the life of Carlos Suárez and his friends Manolo Chana, Álvaro Bultó, Darío Barrio, and Armando del Rey, all of which were pioneers in BASE jumping in Spain
- Forsaken (French: L'Abandon) (2026) – French biographical drama film following the last eleven days of the French teacher, Samuel Paty, who was attacked and killed by an Islamic fundamentalist in Paris in 2020
- G.D.N (2026) – Indian Tamil-language biographical film dramatizing pivotal moments from inventor and engineer G. D. Naidu's life as he battles powerful authorities threatening his groundbreaking innovations in a transforming India
- The Girl with the Leica (Italian: La ragazza con la Leica; German: Das Mädchen mit der Leica) (2026) – Italian-German-Swedish biographical drama film following Gerda Taro, the first female photojournalist killed on a battlefield
- Governor (2026) – Indian Hindi-language financial thriller inspired by the events surrounding the 1990 Indian economic crisis featuring the institutional framework between the Reserve Bank of India (RBI) and the Government of India
- A Great Awakening (2026) – historical drama film following the friendship between George Whitefield and Benjamin Franklin, and Whitefield's impact during the Great Awakening religious movement
- Grizzly Night (2026) – survival thriller film depicts the events of August 12, 1967, when two separate fatal grizzly bear attacks occurred on the same night, miles apart, changing the national perception of wildlife conservation
- Hanuman Ansh (2026) – Indian Hindi-language drama film based on the life of Neem Karoli Baba
- The Housewife (2026) – crime drama film telling the true story of Hermine Braunsteiner who tried to hide from her wartime crimes
- I Can Only Imagine 2 (2026) – religious biographical drama film based on the story behind the group MercyMe's song of the same name, the best-selling Christian single of all time
- I Play Rocky (2026) – biographical drama film following the development and production of the film Rocky (1976)
- The Idiot(s) (2026) – Polish-German drama film based on the true story of Russian novelist Fyodor Dostoevsky and his second wife, Anna Dostoevskaya
- Ikkis (Hindi: इक्कीस) (2026) – Indian Hindi-language biographical war drama film based on the life of Arun Khetarpal, the youngest recipient of the Param Vir Chakra award, and centered around the Battle of Basantar during the 1971 India–Pakistan War
- Ink (2026) – British-French-American following Larry Lamb as he accepts Rupert Murdoch's offer to be the editor of the British tabloid newspaper The Sun
- Jerusalem '67 (2026) – Israeli-American historical war drama film depicting the Six-Day War in 1967
- Jimmy (2026) – biographical drama film about the life of Academy Award winning actor James "Jimmy" Stewart
- Karateka (2026) – Spanish-Belgian biographical sports film following the career of Spanish karateka Sandra Sánchez from her humble beginnings in Talavera de la Reina to winning gold at the 2020 Tokyo Olympics
- Keu Bole Biplobi Keu Bole Dakat (Bengali: কেউ বোলে বিপ্লবী কেউ বোলে ডাকাত) (2026) – Indian Bengali-language biographical action film based on life of Bengali freedom fighter Ananta Lal Singh
- Killing Castro (2026) – biographical drama film based on the true events of Fidel Castro’s visit to New York City in 1960
- The King's Warden (Korean: 왕과 사는 남자) (2026) – South Korean historical drama film exploring the domestic life and psychological isolation of the deposed King Danjong during his exile in 1457
- Krasavitsa (Russian: Красавица) (2026) – Russian historical adventure film based on the true story of the rescue of animals from the siege of Leningrad
- Kūkai (Chinese: 空海) (2026) – Chinese docudrama film, presenting the travels of the Japanese Buddhist monk Kūkai (774–835) in Tang dynasty China
- The Lady (2026) – British drama miniseries depicting the true-life story of the rise and fall of former royal dresser Jane Andrews, who rose from humble beginnings to work for Sarah, Duchess of York, prior to being convicted of the murder of her boyfriend Thomas Cressman in 2001
- Legends (2026) – British crime thriller miniseries depicting the true story of undercover British customs investigators who infiltrated the drug world in the early 1990s
- Litvyak (Russian: Литвяк) (2026) – Russian biographical war film about a Soviet fighter pilot named Lydia Litvyak, who became the most successful female pilot during World War II
- Lone Wolf (Czech: Osamělý vlk) (2026) – Czech biographical war drama film following the life and wartime career of Josef František, a Czechoslovak fighter pilot who served in the Royal Air Force (RAF) during the World War II and became the highest-scoring non-British Allied ace during the Battle of Britain and one of the most successful fighter pilots of the 303 Polish Squadron during the Battle of Britain
- Lucky Strike (2026) – war action thriller film following an American soldier who becomes trapped behind enemy lines during the Battle of the Bulge, and attempts to make his way back to friendly forces while only armed with his Motorola SCR-300 radio
- Madden (2026) – biographical sports film it follows the life of American football coach and commentator John Madden
- Michael (2026) – musical biographical drama film following the life of the American singer Michael Jackson, covering his involvement in the Jackson 5 in the 1960s to the 1980s Bad tour
- The Mosquito Bowl (2026) – war drama film about the Mosquito Bowl game played during World War II
- Moulin (2026) – French historical war film following Jean Moulin, a French Resistance member during the Nazi occupation of France
- Mr. Nelson, Did You Kill People? (Japanese: ネルソンさん、あなたは人を殺しましたか？) (2026) – Japanese-Vietnamese-American biographical film about Allen Nelson, a former U.S. Marine and veteran of the Vietnam War who dedicated his life to anti-war advocacy, giving 1200+ lectures in Japan
- Nobody Loves Kay (2026) – Indonesian coming-of-age drama film inspired by the life of professional esports player Kairi
- Operation Cronos (2026) – Spanish thriller drama film based on the police operative set up in response to the 2017 Barcelona attacks
- Operation Safed Sagar (2026) – Indian Hindi-language historical drama miniseries based on Operation Safed Sagar, the code name for the Indian Air Force's No. 17 Squadron of the IAF operations during the Kargil War
- Parasakthi (Tamil: பராசக்தி) (2026) – Indian Tamil-language political action drama film following two brothers protesting the promotion of Hindi as India's national language, but face threats from a brutal Intelligence Bureau officer
- Pepita the Gunslinger (Spanish: Pepita, La Pistolera) (2026) – Argentine crime thriller film following the breakthrough of a pregnant sex-worker in the Argentine criminal underbelly, inspired by the life of Margarita Di Tullio
- Phoolan (2026) – Indian Hindi-language biographical drama film depicting 48 hours in the life of the most famous female dacoit in the history of India, Phoolan Devi
- Prahaar: The Untold Story of Ujjwal Nikam (2026) – Indian Hindi-language legal drama film exploring Public Prosecutor Ujjwal Nikam's role in legal battles surrounding the 1993 Bombay bombings and 2008 Mumbai attacks
- Pressure (2026) – British-French war drama film centring on the true story of James Stagg and the weather forecasts that determined the date of the D-Day landings as part of Operation Overlord
- Primetime (2026) – biographical psychological thriller film following the origins of the television program To Catch a Predator hosted by Chris Hansen
- Raja Shivaji (2026) – Indian historical action drama film based on the life of Shivaji, the founder of the Maratha Empire
- The Rip (2026) – action thriller film inspired by the true story of Miami-Dade Sheriff Chris Casiano
- Satluj (2026) – Indian biographical drama film based on the life of the human rights activist Jaswant Singh Khalra
- Shatak (Hindi: शतक) (2026) – Indian Hindi-language historical drama film depicting the 100-years history of the Rashtriya Swayamsevak Sangh
- The Social Reckoning (2026) – biographical drama thriller film depicting the 2021 Facebook leak by whistleblower Frances Haugen and investigative reporter Jeff Horwitz
- Straight to Hell (Japanese: 地獄に堕ちるわよ) (2026) – Japanese biographical drama miniseries following Kazuko Hosoki's rise from postwar Japan to becoming one of the country's most famous and controversial fortune tellers during the Showa and Heisei eras
- The Stunt Driver (2026) – Canadian historical comedy film based on the life of Canadian daredevil stuntman Ken Carter
- The Swedish Connection (Swedish: Den svenska länken) (2026) – Swedish war drama film about Swedish foreign ministry bureaucrat Gösta Engzell, who developed and executed covert plans to rescue European Jewish refugees by using legal loopholes and paperwork
- Tamerlane: Rise of the Last Conqueror (Kazakh: Темірлан) (2026) – Uzbek-Kazakh-American historical action film depicting the rise of Timur in 14th-century Central Asia
- Tenzing (2026) – Australian-British-American biographical drama film based on Nepalese-Indian Sherpa Tenzing Norgay's 1953 ascent of Mount Everest with New Zealand climber Sir Edmund Hillary
- Tony (2026) – biographical comedy drama film based on Anthony Bourdain's early years working in Provincetown, Massachusetts, stories from which were featured in his 2000 memoir Kitchen Confidential
- Trust Me, I'm a Doctor (2026) – biographical drama film depicting the story of Dr. Sandeep Kapoor, whose life is turned upside down when he is implicated in the death of his former patient, model and reality TV star, Anna Nicole Smith
- Unabomber (2026) – crime drama film based on the domestic terrorist, Ted Kaczynski
- The Uprising (2026) – British-American historical action film dramatizing the 1381 Peasants' Revolt in England
- Violetta Villas (2026) – Polish-Bulgarian biographical film depicting the story of Violetta Villas, one of the best-known Polish singers of the 20th century
- When the Night Falls (French: La Troisième Nuit) (2026) – French historical drama film following the true story of a mission to rescue of more than one hundred Jewish children from an internment camp near Lyon in August 1942, during the Holocaust
- The Weight (2026) – historical drama film Samuel Murphy is a World War I veteran and widower, struggling to provide for his young daughter Penny amidst the Great Depression
- The Witness (2026) – British crime drama miniseries depicting the 1992 killing of Rachel Nickell and the aftermath for her husband and son
- Young Washington (2026) – epic historical war drama film based on the early life of the Founding Father and first president of the United States, George Washington
