= Anguiano (surname) =

Anguiano is a surname originating in Spain. Notable people with the surname include:

- Armando Ayala Anguiano (1928–2013), independent journalist, historian, editor, entrepreneur and novelist
- Carlos Anguiano (born 1999), American professional soccer player
- Eduardo Montagner Anguiano, Chipilo Venetian writer
- Humberto Anguiano (born 1910, date of death unknown), Mexican modern pentathlete
- Karen Quiroga Anguiano (born 1980), Mexican politician
- Lupe Anguiano (born 1929), Mexican-American civil rights activist
- Mario Anguiano Moreno (born 1962), Mexican politician and Governor of Colima from 2009 to 2015
- Raúl Anguiano (1915–2006), Mexican painter
- Sergio Salvador Aguirre Anguiano (1943–2020), Mexican jurist and Associate Justice of the Supreme Court of Justice of the Nation

== See also ==
- Anguiano, a small town in the province of La Rioja, Spain
- Comarca de Anguiano, a comarca in La Rioja province in Spain
