= Héctor de Mauleón =

Mexican journalist (b. 1963)

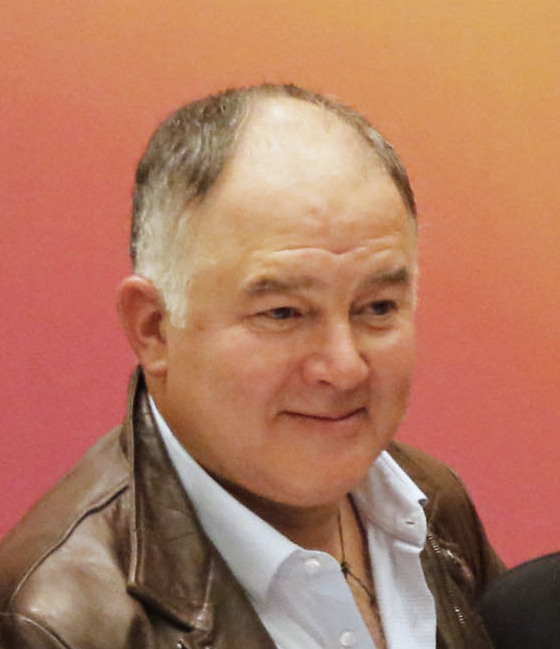
De Mauleón in 2017

Héctor de Mauleón Rodríguez (born 1963) is a Mexican journalist. He has worked for multiple publications, including El Universal, Nexos, Cambio, and Contenido, among many others.

== Life and career ==
Héctor de Mauleón Rodríguez was born in 1963 in Mexico City. He began working as a journalist in 1989. In 1996, he received the National Journalism Award in the Sports category. In 2016, he received the Gold Medal of Merit in the Fine Arts and the José Pagés Llergo Communication Award. In 2026, he was credited as a screenwriter for the film Facing El Chapo.
