= Sophie Zhang (whistleblower) =

American data scientist and whistleblower

- 张学菲
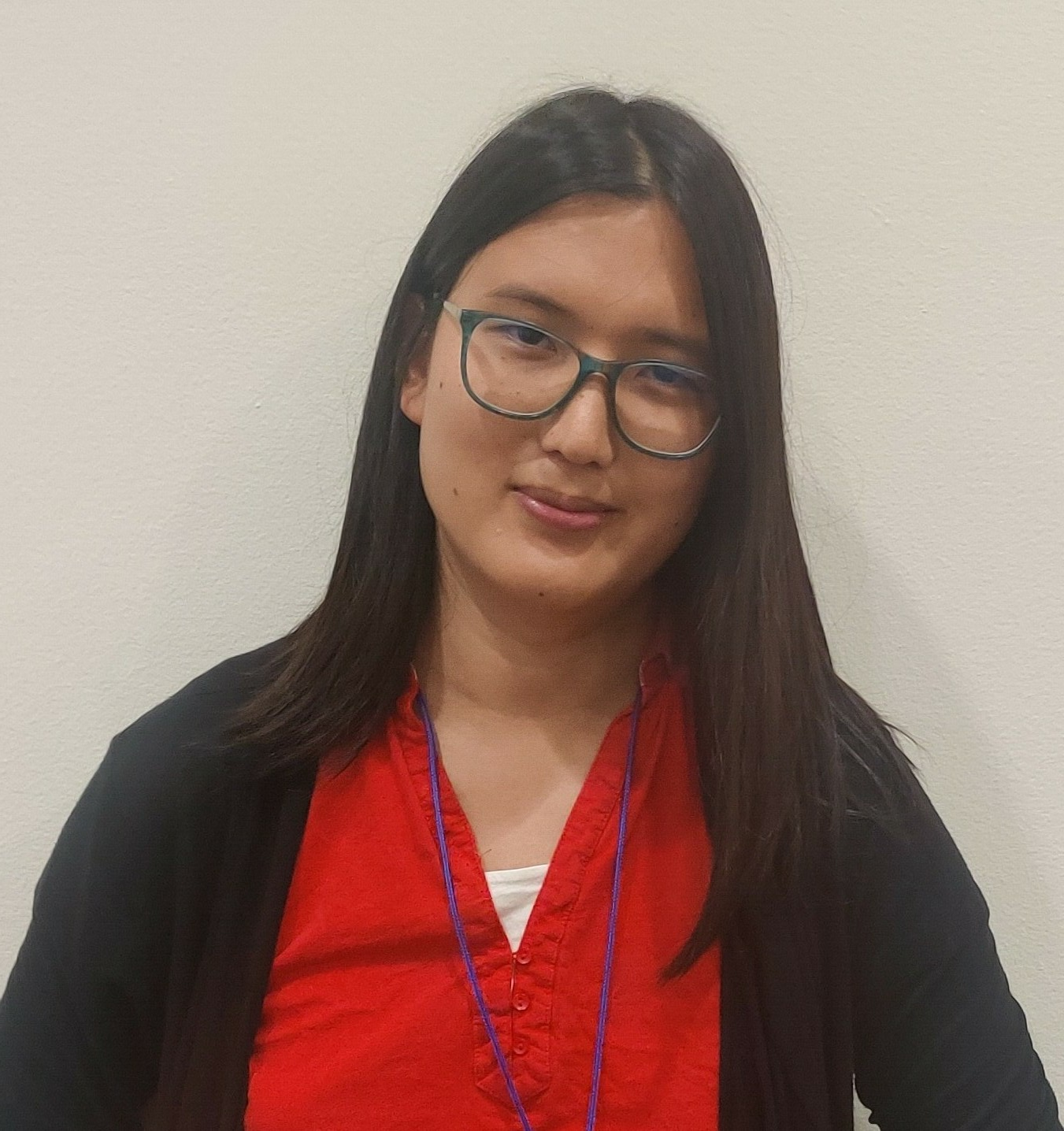
- Sophie Zhang (2022)
- Born: Ann Arbor, Michigan, U.S.
- Education: University of Michigan
- Occupation: Data analyst
- Employer: Facebook (until September 2020)
- Known for: Revealing details of Facebook superficial monitoring of online political manipulations

Sophie Zhang
- Simplified Chinese: 张学菲
Transcriptions
Standard Mandarin
- Hanyu Pinyin: Zhāng Xuéfēi

Sophie Zhang is an American data scientist and whistleblower who formerly worked at the Facebook Site Integrity fake engagement team, created to deal with bot accounts, often controlled by authoritarian governments' entities.

From 2018 to 2020, while investigating those fake engagements, Zhang uncovered abusive political manipulation and opposition harassment networks in 25 countries. She testified that Facebook negligence allowed those authoritarian regimes to manipulate public discourse. Zhang reported that most of these subversive networks use Facebook's organization pages, configured with human names and photographs to mimic human accounts in order to successfully evade Facebook's emerging efforts to counter fake users.

The British newspaper The Guardian dedicated a series, The Facebook Loophole, based on Zhang's resources and accounts, to report on these Facebook-based political manipulations. Following later whistleblower Frances Haugen's testimony on Facebook's impact on children, interest toward Zhang's testimony increased with investigation from European and American legislative bodies ongoing.

== Career ==
Zhang worked at Facebook for two years as a data scientist until September 2020. She was in the "Fake Engagement" team, a sub-division of the "Spam team" assigned to look for abuses of the platform. Zhang investigated “fake engagement” such as inauthentic likes, comments, shares, and reactions. There was no Facebook team dedicated to investigating and rooting out these fake or abusive organization pages.

=== Unveiled government abuses ===
She found series of "multiple blatant attempts by foreign national governments to abuse our platform on vast scales to mislead their own citizenry, [which] caused international news on multiple occasions". Most notably, these included:

- Honduras, 2018: President Juan Orlando Hernández - From June to July 2018, 78% of Hernández’s Facebook posts received likes that were not from real people, artificially boosting his apparent popular support by a factor of five. The social manager of Hernández's official Facebook pages, for both Hernández and his late sister who had served as communications minister, was directly controlling several hundreds of fake entities. This campaign used Facebook's Organization Pages, configured with human names and photographs, to add support and to lure unaware readers.
- Azerbaijan, 2019: Zhang found the ruling party to be using thousands of Organization Pages to harass opposition parties. The network of pages was still active as of June 2021.
- India, USA, Mexico, Honduras, Ecuador, Bolivia, Paraguay, Argentina, Italy, Poland, Ukraine, Albania, Bulgaria, Turkey, Iraq, Tunisia, Mongolia, India, Myanmar, Indonesia, Philippines, South Korea, Dominican Republic, Afghanistan, El Salvador, and more.

=== Departure from Facebook ===
Zhang was fired from Facebook in September 2020. She declined a $64,000 severance package attached to a non-disparagement agreement restricting her ability to speak publicly about Facebook issues. On her departure day, she posted a 7,800-word departure message to Facebook's internal message board outlining Facebook’s failure to combat political manipulation campaigns similar to the Russian interference in the 2016 United States elections. Anticipating Facebook's deletion of the post, she created a personal, password-protected website with a copy of the post, then distributed its web address and password to Facebook co-workers.

Facebook suppressed the message on the internal board, then contacted Zhang's web hosting service and domain registrar to request and force her private website offline.

=== Facebook criticisms ===
Zhang argued that Facebook was not acting out of malice, but rather in slapdash, haphazard ways, concerned with self preservation and public relations. She pointed out several shortcomings in Facebook's management of such unauthentic political engagement on its services.

- Facebook priority assessment. Structure and effort investments focuses on “large-scale” issues (ex: spam) rather that specific uncivic and political cases. Issues are prioritized by volume, so outright political manipulations in smaller countries are discounted despite their real impact. Zhang reported that 99% of resources are dedicated to fight spams. Expansion to fight political and election manipulations was rejected due to limitation of human resources.
- Facebook has an "enforcement gap", with a dedicated team fighting fake accounts, but no team fighting fake organizations that can work like and mimic user accounts.
- Facebook minimized bottom-up alerts by on-the-ground data analysts.
- Facebook investment priorities and associated internal workload makes it impossible to properly manage political manipulations.
- Facebook decision processes are generally haphazard, despite its effort to project itself as a fully competent entity.
- Facebook has a Western-centric focus. Western occurrences of political manipulations are dealt with rapidly, while responses to occurrences in other countries are delayed or not responded to at all.
- Facebook waits for and reacts to media coverage in a public relationship management approach. Facebook management has used negative media coverage to assess priorities, arguing that no previous media coverage means no relative importance of an issue.
- Facebook acts with no public oversight. Low-level data analysts have control and censorship power over world leaders and public discourses, with the capacity to let political manipulation continue or to stop it. While at Facebook, Zhang had monitored and personally taken or not taken action in countless countries, some of which were later shaken by civil unrest. Zhang declared she therefore has "blood on [her] hands".

=== Reaction to Frances Haugen ===
Zhang has expressed support for another Facebook whistleblower, Frances Haugen, who shared internal company documents with The Wall Street Journal and on October 5, 2021, testified before the United States Senate Commerce Committee's Sub-Committee on Consumer Protection, Product Safety, and Data Security. On October 12, 2021, Zhang told CNN she has shared documents about Facebook with a United States law enforcement agency, and that she is available to testify before Congress and is encouraged by the bipartisan support for congressional action after Haugen's testimony.

=== British Parliament testimony ===
On October 14, 2021, it was announced Zhang would testify before the British Parliament on October 18, 2021, about "her work as a data scientist for the Facebook Site Integrity fake engagement team, dealing with bot accounts, often operated by government backed agencies in countries such as Russia," according to Damian Collins, the chair of the British Parliament Online Safety Bill committee.

On October 18, Zhang testified to the British Parliament. The hearing was via video conference and was mostly filled with members working on a bill to tackle harmful online contents. Zhang stated that:

- Facebook observably neglects and allows disinformation campaigns on Facebook, to prioritize profits. This is consequential to Facebook, a company, structural mission to first and foremost make profit and protect itself.
- Facebook observably allows authoritarian governments to manipulate political discourse.
- Facebook observably was more reluctant to remove fake accounts if those accounts were connected to political leaders. This preferential treatment encourages major politicians to continue the violation and to do so openly.
- Facebook observably let fake engagement run among developing countries' online communities. Facebook’s vice-President of Integrity Guy Rosen, stated that Facebook would focus its limited human resources on Western democracies and monitoring hostile actions from their immediate online threats such as Russia and Iran. Human resources dedicated to fighting Facebook-based manipulations differs considerably.
- Facebook senior management has observably shown indifference and deflection when facing the issue of political manipulations on Facebook.
- Facebook senior management has conflict of interest, having to both keep good relations with political leaders and to set the rules for unacceptable violations on the platform.
- Facebook-based political manipulations issues could be countered if adequate staffing and funding was allocated.

Zhang testimony was connected to Frances Haugen's recent testimony to the US congress, which mentioned Facebook-supported ethnic polarization and violence in Ethiopia.

=== Whistleblower advocacy ===
Zhang authored a piece "How to blow the whistle on Facebook – from someone who already did" in The Guardian, where she gives feedback and recommendations to potential Facebook's whistleblowers.

== Personal life ==
Zhang is a transgender woman; she said she was "tired of being in the closet as a transgender woman" and that was a core aspect of her identity that informed her actions at Facebook and after she left.

In August 2022, Zhang filed a complaint to the University of Michigan alleging that her father, Youxue Zhang, a professor at the College of Literature, Science, and the Arts, engaged in abusive contact towards her on account of her gender identity. She stated that he was active in abusive conduct in two separate instances, once in 2004 as an adolescent, and once in 2010 while she was a student at the University of Michigan. She argued that his actions violated university policy on sexual and gender-based misconduct. The complaint was dismissed by the university, with the case coordinator reasoning that the conduct alleged in the complaint did not occur in a university program or activity.

== See also ==
- Christopher Wylie
- Criticism of Facebook
- Facebook Files
- Frances Haugen
- Instagram's impact on people
- Russian interference in the 2016 United States elections
- Edward Snowden
