= Armando Ayala Anguiano =

Mexican journalist and historian

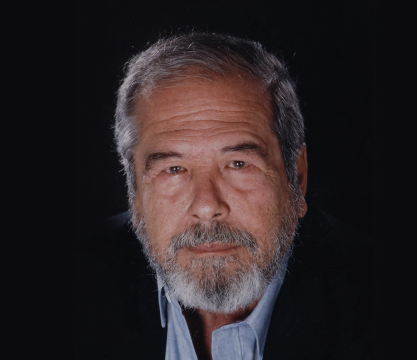
Armando Ayala Anguiano

Armando Ayala Anguiano (May 27, 1928 – November 15, 2013) was an independent journalist, historian, editor, entrepreneur and novelist.

== Biography ==
Born in Abasolo, Guanajuato, Mexico. In order to contribute to the family income, he started working as a telegraphist since he was a teenager. Using the Morse code, he traveled throughout the country and mastered the Spanish language. His intellectual instruction came mainly from his voracity for reading. Years later he worked at the Mexicana de Aviación air control tower. In Tijuana he wrote his first novel: Las ganas de creer (The Desire to Believe). He studied film screenwriting at the University of Southern California. In Mexico City he failed to sell his scripts. At the age of 23 (1951) he joined El sol de México journal (Cadena García Valseca) as a journalist.

In 1954 he was awarded a scholarship to study Political Science at The Sorbonne University in Paris, France. He joined the press room of Visión, the Latin American version of an American magazine. This allowed him to travel extensively through post-World War II Europe and later on to New York City, Argentina, and Peru.

A friend of André Labarthe, founder in Paris of Constellation magazine and in London of Le France Libre, Ayala returned to Mexico at 33, entering the Writers Center (Centro de Escritores) as an intern. Eager to found an independent magazine, he was supported by the owner of the Novedades journal, don Rómulo O'Farrill Jr. and his daring publicist, Fernando Canales.

The first issue of the monthly magazine Contenido appeared in June 1963 with a print run of 60 thousand copies and extensive television publicity provided by his investing partners Rómulo O'Farrill Jr. and Miguel Alemán Velasco. Of practical Reader’s Digest-type size and easy reading, the magazine contained general culture investigations, political news, and unknown aspects of the official history.

Contenido’s success allowed it to be free of government support and able to express open criticism to the ruling presidents. A fighter of corruption, Ayala was given an award by the Spanish news agency Efe in 1978 for his story La mordida, vergüenza de México (Bribing, the Shame of Mexico).

Due to his continued criticism to government officials, president José López Portillo asked investing partners O’Farrill and Alemán to avoid political topics in Contenido. Ayala refused to comply and opted to close the magazine, preventing the printing of the April 1985 issue. The partners reconsidered and continued supporting Ayala in reopening the magazine. Contenido continued to be the most successful monthly magazine in Mexico for 45 years.

The historic series México de carne y hueso (Mexico, Flesh and Bone) (14 monthly compilable issues, 1991–1992) sold thousands of copies. His masterpiece, La epopeya de México (The Epic of Mexico), published in 2005 by the Fondo de Cultura Económica, is divided in two volumes: I) From Prehistory to Santa Anna, and II) From Juarez to the PRI (Partido Revolucionario Institucional).

A brain embolism truncated Armando Ayala's literary talent in 2006. His son Roberto Ayala Sloan, in agreement with the other partners, sold his part to Galas de México S. A. de C. V., an affiliate of Grupo Carso.

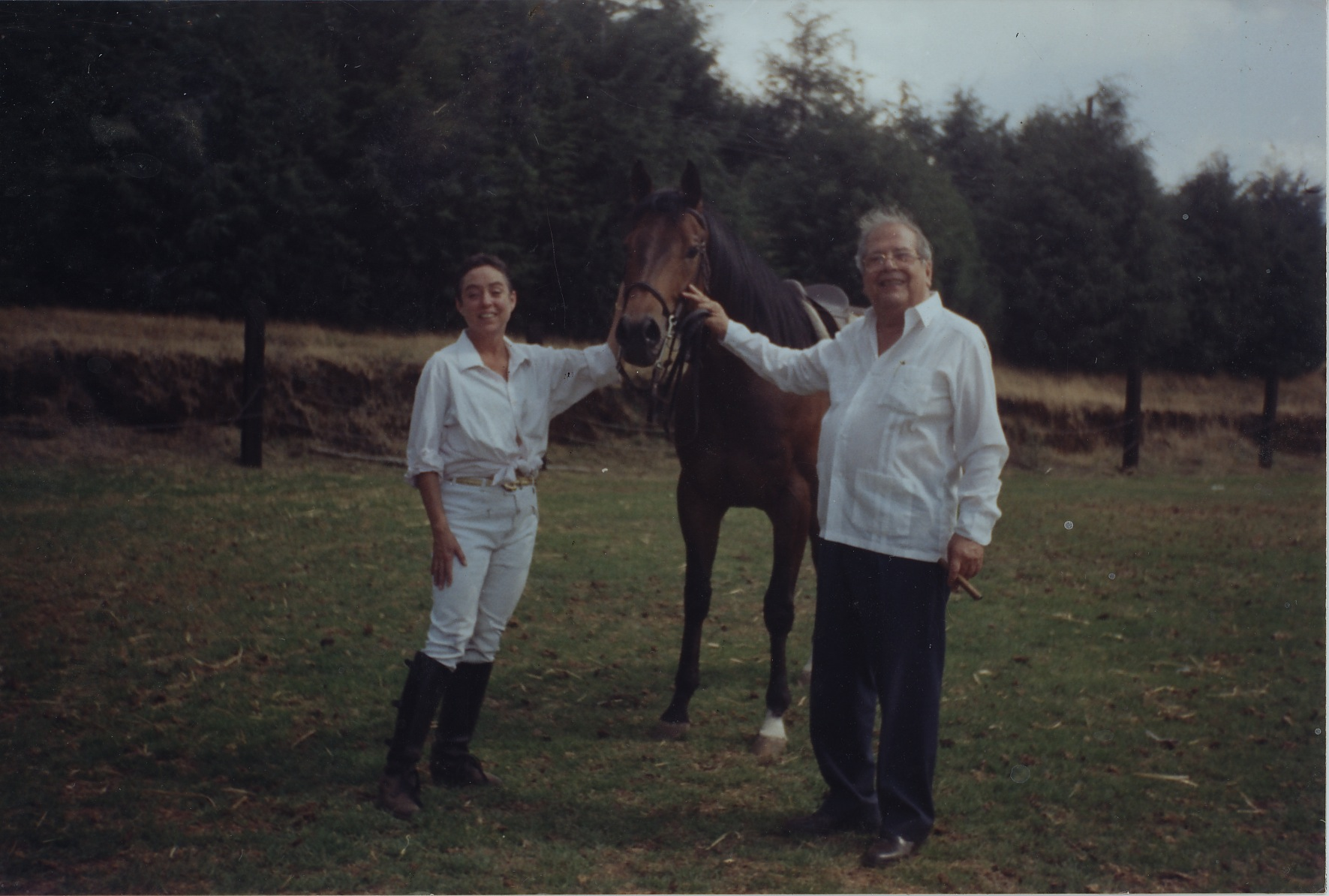
Armando Ayala Anguiano and his second wife, Esperanza Bollard.

Divorced from Sara Sloan, with whom he had two children (Sara and Roberto), he died at his house in Malinalco, Estado de Mexico by his second wife, Esperanza Bolland, with whom he shared his last 30 years.

== Published works ==
- Las ganas de creer (The Desire to Believe) – Libro Mex editores (1958)
- El paso de la nada (The Passage of Nowhere) – Editorial Goyanarte, Buenos Aires (1960)
- México antes de los aztecas (Mexico Before the Aztecs) – Publicaciones AAA (1967)
- México de carne y hueso (Mexico, Bone and Flesh)– Editorial Contenido (1967, 1991)
- Cómo conquisté a los aztecas. Hernán Cortés (How Did I Conquer the Aztecs, Hernan Cortes) – Editorial Contenido (1980). Editorial Random House Mondadori (1990)
- JLP: los secretos de un sexenio (Jose Lopez Portillo, the Secrets of a Presidential Term) – Editorial Grijalbo (1984)
- Zapata y las grandes mentiras de la Revolución Mexicana (Zapata and the Great Lies of the Mexican Revolution) – Editorial Grijalbo (1985)
- Juárez de carne y hueso (Juarez, Bone and Flesh) – Editorial Contenido (1991). Editorial Random House Mondadori (2006)
- México en crisis (Mexico in Crisis) – Ediciones Océano (1992)
- Salinas y su México. Historia sin mitos ni pasiones (Salinas and His Mexico. History without Myths or Passions) – Editorial Grijalbo (1995)
- Mujeres que dejaron huella (Women Who Left a Mark) – Editorial Contenido (1998, 1999)
- The gringo connection – Editorial Océano (2000)
