= Frances Haugen =

American product manager, data scientist and engineer, and whistleblower

- Frances Haugen at the International Journalism Festival in 2024
- Born: 1983 or 1984 (age 42–43); Iowa City, Iowa, U.S.
- Education: Olin College (BS); Harvard University (MBA)
- Occupations: Data scientist and engineer, product manager
- Website: franceshaugen.com

Frances Haugen (born 1983 or 1984) is an American product manager, data engineer, scientist, and whistleblower. She disclosed tens of thousands of Facebook's internal documents to the Securities and Exchange Commission and The Wall Street Journal in the 2021 Facebook leak.

Haugen has also testified before the United States Senate Commerce Committee's Sub-Committee on Consumer Protection, Product Safety, and Data Security, the Parliament of the United Kingdom, and the European Parliament. In 2023, her memoir, The Power of One: How I Found the Strength to Tell the Truth and Why I Blew the Whistle on Facebook, was published by Little, Brown & Company. She started Beyond the Screen, a non-profit organization to hold social media platforms accountable.

== Early life ==
Frances Haugen was raised in Iowa City, Iowa, where she attended Horn Elementary and Northwest Junior High School, and graduated from Iowa City West High School in 2002. Her father was a doctor, and her mother became an Episcopalian priest after an academic career.

Haugen studied electrical and computer engineering in the founding class at the Franklin W. Olin College of Engineering and graduated in 2006. She later earned a Master of Business Administration from Harvard Business School in 2011.

== Career ==
In 2006, after graduating from college, Haugen was hired by Google, and worked as a software engineer and product manager on Google Ads, Google Book Search, on a class action litigation settlement related to Google's publication of copyrighted book content, as well as on Google+. At Google, Haugen co-authored a patent for a method of adjusting the ranking of search results. During her career at Google, she completed her MBA; her tuition was paid by Google. While at Google, she was a technical co-founder of the desktop dating app Secret Agent Cupid, precursor to the mobile app Hinge.

In 2015, she began work as a data product manager at Yelp to improve search using image recognition, and after a year moved to Pinterest.

In 2019, Haugen joined Facebook, after a person close to her became radicalized online; she "felt compelled to take an active role in creating a better, less toxic Facebook" and thought "Facebook has the potential to bring out the best of us". When Facebook recruited her, she expressed interest in a role related to misinformation; in 2019 she became a product manager on the Facebook civic integrity team.

Following the 2020 United States elections, Facebook dissolved its civic integrity team, and Haugen became disillusioned. While still at Facebook, she decided to become a whistleblower, due to what she has since described as a pattern of Facebook's prioritization of profit over public safety, and left Facebook in May 2021.

In the spring of 2021, she contacted John Tye, a founder of the pro bono law firm Whistleblower Aid, for help; Tye agreed to represent her and to help protect her anonymity. In the late summer of 2021, Haugen began meeting with members of the United States Congress, including Senator Richard Blumenthal and Senator Marsha Blackburn.

=== The Facebook Files ===
Starting in September 2021, The Wall Street Journal published The Facebook Files: A Wall Street Journal Investigation, a series of news reports "based on a review of internal Facebook documents, including research reports, online employee discussions and drafts of presentations to senior management." The investigation was published in nine reports, including examinations of rules exemptions for high-profile users, Facebook's impacts on youth, the impacts of its 2018 algorithm changes, weaknesses in Facebook's response to human trafficking and drug cartels, and vaccine misinformation, followed by a profile article about Haugen, given that she had gathered the documents that supported the investigative reports.

Following the publication of the Wall Street Journal articles about Facebook's practices, the United States Senate Commerce Committee's Sub-Committee on Consumer Protection, Product Safety, and Data Security scheduled two hearings, with Antigone Davis, the global head of safety for Facebook, the first to be questioned, on September 30, 2021, Haugen, the hitherto-anonymous whistleblower, was questioned on October 5, 2021.

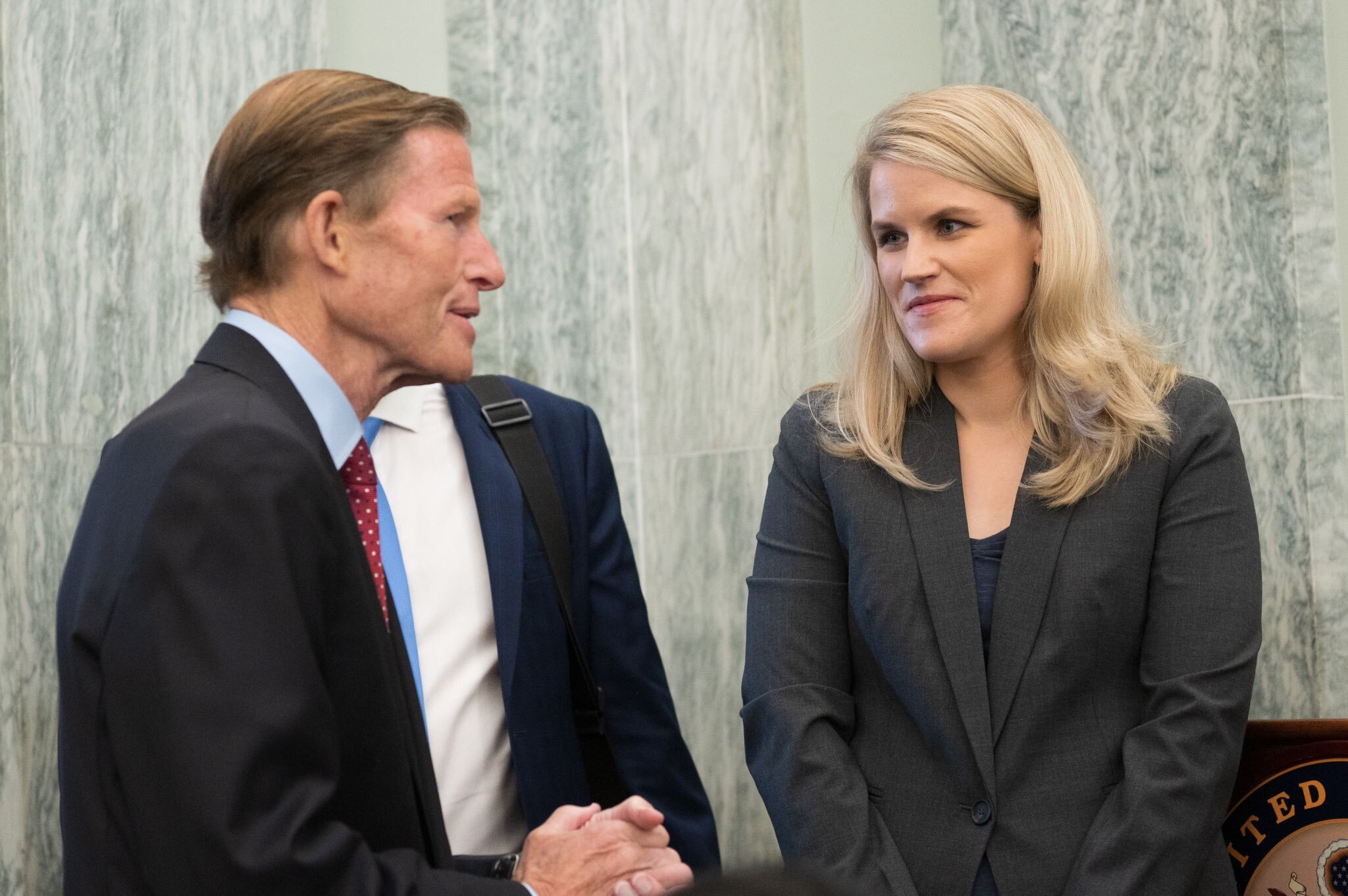
Haugen with Senator Richard Blumenthal, in 2021

On October 3, 2021, Haugen disclosed her identity as the Facebook whistleblower when she appeared on 60 Minutes. Haugen had first provided the evidence to Congress, regulators and the media under the pseudonym Sean before she revealed her identity on the 60 Minutes show. During the interview, she discussed the Facebook program known as "Civic Integrity", which had been intended to curb misinformation and other threats to election security. The program was dissolved following the 2020 elections, which Haugen stated "really feels like a betrayal of democracy to me," and which she believed contributed to the 2021 United States Capitol attack. Haugen stated: "The thing I saw at Facebook over and over again was there were conflicts of interest between what was good for the public and what was good for Facebook. And Facebook, over and over again, chose to optimize for its own interests, like making more money."

Haugen had shared documents with members of the U.S. Congress and offices of various attorneys general, but not with the Federal Trade Commission. Facebook's market capitalization dropped by $6 billion within 24 hours of Haugen's October 3 60 Minutes interview and after the October 4, 2021 Facebook outage. Based on the leaked documents, Kevin Roose, writing for The New York Times, suggested Facebook might be a weaker social media company than it previously appeared to be.

After Haugen publicly disclosed her identity, Pierre Omidyar's philanthropic organization, Luminate Group, began to provide support to Haugen, including help with press and government relations in Europe.

=== Securities and Exchange Commission complaints ===
Haugen filed at least eight complaints with the Securities and Exchange Commission (SEC), covering topics reported by The Wall Street Journal, and including how Facebook deals with political misinformation, hate speech, teenage mental health, human trafficking, the promotion of ethnic violence, preferential treatment of certain users, and its communications with investors. For example, in one of her SEC whistleblower complaints, Haugen alleged Facebook had misled investors, given that they had misrepresented the progress they had made in tackling hate, violence and misinformation on the platform. As another example, in a February 2022 complaint, Haugen alleged "material misrepresentations and omissions in statements to investors" by Facebook, related to its efforts to address climate change misinformation and COVID misinformation, based on internal Facebook documents. The documents provided by Haugen to the SEC also pertained to Facebook's management of election-related misinformation in the United States after the November 2020 election.

Haugen's complaints included internal Facebook documents pertaining to Facebook management of misinformation and hate speech in India. The complaint stated that many users and pages associated with the Rashtriya Swayamsevak Sangh (RSS) promoted fear-mongering and anti-Muslim narratives, with an intent to incite violence. She stated that Facebook was well aware of the incendiary anti-Muslim narratives promoted in India. Haugen also asserted that Facebook lacked algorithms to detect hate speech in Hindi and Bengali, causing such content to be ignored. Facebook added hate speech algorithms in Hindi in 2020, and in Bengali in 2021.

Public statements by Facebook CEO Mark Zuckerberg are referenced in the SEC complaints filed by Haugen, along with her allegation that Zuckerberg is ultimately responsible as CEO, since he controlled Facebook. Various public statements by Zuckerberg, including his 2020 testimony before the U.S. Congress, appear to be inconsistent with internal Facebook documents submitted by Haugen.

=== October 5, 2021, U.S. Congress testimony ===
Haugen testifies in the United States Senate, in October 2021

On October 5, 2021, Haugen testified before the United States Senate Commerce Committee's Sub-Committee on Consumer Protection, Product Safety, and Data Security. A written version of her opening statement to the U.S. Senate subcommittee was published on October 4, 2021.

Haugen stated during the hearing, "The company's leadership knows how to make Facebook and Instagram safer, but won't make the necessary changes because they have put their astronomical profits before people. Congressional action is needed. They won’t solve this crisis without your help." Haugen further discussed Myanmar and Ethiopia, stating Facebook is "literally fanning ethnic violence" when engagement-based ranking is deployed without functioning integrity and security systems. Haugen also indicated she is in communication with another U.S. congressional committee about issues related to espionage and disinformation, and a reason she has not shared documents with the Federal Trade Commission is because she believes Facebook systems will "continue to be dangerous even if they're broken up." After the hearing, Senator Richard Blumenthal, chair of the Commerce subcommittee, said Haugen "wants to fix Facebook, not burn it to the ground."

In the wake of Haugen's testimony, the response from Facebook CEO Mark Zuckerberg that day included "Many of the claims don't make any sense. I think most of us just don’t recognize the false picture of the company that is being painted", and "We're committed to doing the best work we can, but at some level the right body to assess trade-offs between social equities is our democratically elected Congress." A post-hearing statement from Lena Pietsch, Facebook's director of policy communications, included, "We agree on one thing. It's time to begin to create standard rules for the internet." Senator Blumenthal indicated he wanted Zuckerberg to testify before Congress regarding the documents disclosed by Haugen, and that the subcommittee might issue a subpoena to Facebook for more records.

=== State attorneys general actions ===
Documents disclosed by Haugen were shared with state attorneys general offices in California, Massachusetts, Vermont, Nebraska and Tennessee. On October 13, 2021, in response to disclosures made by Haugen to The Wall Street Journal, more than a dozen U.S. state attorneys general sent a letter to Facebook requesting information about the Facebook "XCheck system" that protects high-profile users and Facebook action against COVID-19 vaccine misinformation.

On November 12, 2021, Ohio Attorney General Dave Yost filed a lawsuit against Meta Platforms (formerly known as Facebook) on behalf of investors, alleging repeated false representations by executives, including chief executive Mark Zuckerberg, CFO David Wehner, and global affairs and communications executive Nick Clegg, about the safety of the platform, based on documents leaked by Haugen and documents collectively known as "The Facebook Papers". The lawsuit seeks over $100 billion in damages and for the company to implement reforms.

On November 18, 2021, a bipartisan group of state attorneys general announced a consumer protection investigation of Meta based on documents shared by Haugen. The investigation includes a focus on Instagram, how Meta promotes engagement, and possible harms to children and teenagers.

=== Additional actions ===
On October 6, 2021, Haugen's attorney at the time, John Tye, said the legal team and Haugen were in communication with the Federal Trade Commission, as well as the European Parliament and the French Parliament. The United States Senate Committee on Homeland Security and Governmental Affairs and the United States House Select Committee to Investigate the January 6th Attack on the United States Capitol have confirmed plans to meet with Haugen.

On October 11, 2021, Facebook's Oversight Board, an external review panel which rules on select content moderation decisions of the company, announced that it would be speaking with Haugen about her experiences with the company and its practices. On October 21, 2021, Haugen met with the U.S. House Judiciary antitrust subcommittee chair David Cicilline and ranking member Ken Buck.

On October 25, 2021, Haugen testified before the Parliament of the United Kingdom. During her testimony, she advocated for government regulation of Facebook, and for Facebook to make changes.

Haugen at the Web Summit in Lisbon, in November 2021

On November 8, 2021, she appeared before the European Parliament in a hearing organized by the Committee on the Internal Market and Consumer Protection. In a nearly three-hour hearing, she urged the Parliament debating the Digital Services Act to mandate social media platforms to operate transparently and not to create loopholes that Big Tech could exploit. Haugen said the DSA has "the potential to be a global gold standard" and an inspiration for other countries on safeguarding democracy on social media. She emphasized how linguistically diverse Europe could force the platforms to take a systemic approach to safety, rather than focus only on content moderation and on major languages.

On May 18, 2022, after the European Parliament and the Council of the European Union had reached a political agreement on the Digital Services Act, Haugen reappeared before the Parliament. She congratulated the EU lawmakers for the result and called for the European Commission and the member states to put a lot of effort into enforcing the DSA, so that it will not be "a dead letter".

In June 2022, Politico reported that Haugen plans to establish a non-profit organization called "Beyond the Screen" to enhance awareness of the harms of social media. The new organization will focus on litigation and investor-based strategies in order to provide legal and economic incentives for mitigating harms.

In October 2022, Haugen joined the Council for Responsible Social Media project launched by Issue One to address the negative mental, civic, and public health impacts of social media in the United States co-chaired by former House Democratic Caucus Leader Dick Gephardt and former Massachusetts Lieutenant Governor Kerry Healey.

=== Memoir: The Power of One ===
In December 2021, Little, Brown and Company announced a book deal with Haugen for her memoir. In 2023, Haugen's memoir The Power of One: How I Found the Strength to Tell the Truth and Why I Blew the Whistle on Facebook was published by Little, Brown and Company. A review in The Washington Post by Bethany McLean states, "If all Haugen’s book did was present her whistleblowing case (the legal merits of which have yet to be decided), it might still be an important part of the ongoing chronicling of how we allowed social media's dangers to creep up on us. But what really makes the book worth reading is the broader wisdom in her story (and the absence of the self-importance implied by the book's unfortunate title)."

== In popular media ==
Haugen is portrayed by Mikey Madison in the 2026 feature film The Social Reckoning, written and directed by Aaron Sorkin, and based on the 2023 book Broken Code: Inside Facebook and the Fight to Expose Its Harmful Secrets by Jeff Horwitz. With Jeremy Allen White starring as Horwitz, and Jeremy Strong as Zuckerberg, the film was released on October 9, 2026.

== Personal life ==
In 2011, Haugen was diagnosed with celiac disease, and in 2014 while going through a divorce, she had to be hospitalized in intensive care. In 2021, Haugen told The Guardian she was motivated to focus her work at Facebook on addressing misinformation because of her experience with losing a friend, who had been hired to help with household tasks during her recovery, after the friend visited online forums and became a proponent of conspiratorial beliefs that included white nationalism and the occult. After leaving Facebook, Haugen relocated to Puerto Rico, and has invested in a cryptocurrency company.

Haugen has Norwegian ancestry and was awarded an America-Norway Heritage Award from the Norway-America Association in 2022 for her work as a whistleblower.

== Works ==
- Haugen, Frances (2023). The Power of One: Blowing the Whistle on Facebook. Hodder & Stoughton. ISBN 978-1-3997-0831-9.

== See also ==
- Careless People – memoir by another Facebook ex-employee whistleblower
- Chris Hughes
- Christopher Wylie – data consultant who prompted the 2018 Facebook–Cambridge Analytica data scandal
- Criticism of Facebook
- Sean Parker
- Sophie Zhang (whistleblower) – former Facebook data analyst and whistleblower
- Digital Services Act
- Online Safety Act 2023
