= 2016 recapture of El Chapo =

Joint U.S. and Mexican-led military operation

Operation Black Swan
- Part of the Mexican drug war and the war on drugs
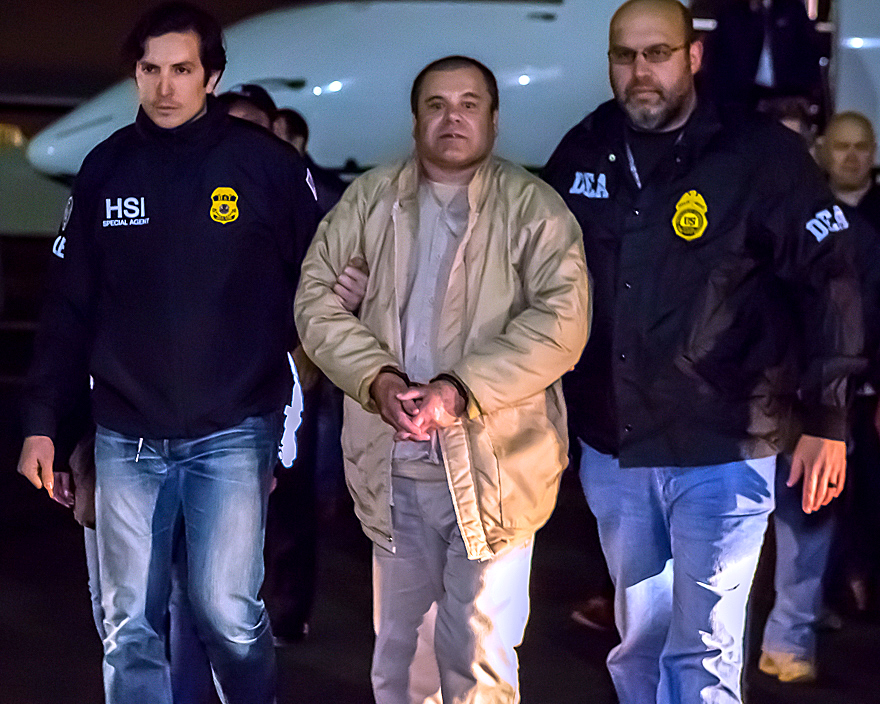
- El Chapo just after his extradition from Mexico
Date	8 January 2016
Location	Los Mochis, Sinaloa, Mexico
Result	Successful raid, Joaquín Guzmán recaptured

Belligerents
Mexico; United States	Sinaloa Cartel

Commanders and leaders
Enrique Peña Nieto; Arely Gómez González; Vidal Francisco Soberón Sanz	Joaquín Guzmán Loera (surrendered); Jorge Iván Gastélum Ávila (surrendered)

Casualties and losses
1 wounded	5 killed; 6 wounded and arrested

Operation Black Swan was a joint U.S. and Mexican-led military operation that resulted in the recapture of the Sinaloa Cartel leader, Joaquín "El Chapo" Guzmán, following a deadly firefight in the city of Los Mochis, Sinaloa, on 8 January 2016. Officials in the Mexican government announced that the operation was planned and executed by the Mexican Navy Special Forces, and that they had originally targeted an important Sinaloa Cartel assassin at a home in Los Mochis, and happened to find Guzmán as well. U.S. government officials announced that members of the United States Army's Delta Force and the U.S. Marshals assisted the Mexican Marines in the 8 January mission, and pursued the extradition of Guzmán to the United States.

Guzmán had been on the run since his escape from a federal prison in Almoloya de Juárez, Mexico, on 11 July 2015. On 8 January 2016, Mexican naval forces moved into position to raid a house in Los Mochis, Sinaloa, believed to be occupied by one of Guzmán's top assassins or sicarios. As they entered the building, an "intense" gun battle erupted between the marines and several armed assailants, leaving five of the cartel gunmen dead and six wounded. One marine was also wounded. During the chaos of the firefight, the marines discovered Guzmán, who fled the house through a series of tunnels and then attempted to escape in a stolen vehicle. Shortly thereafter he was spotted by PF Federal Police Mexican and taken to a motel a short distance away from the house. Hours after his capture Guzmán told the police, "You are all going to die."

The Mexican Marines reported that they found an arms cache at the house consisting of eight assault rifles, two M16 rifles with grenade launchers, two Barrett M82 anti-materiel rifles, and a loaded rocket-propelled grenade launcher. Two armoured cars were also seized.

A year after Guzmán's capture, he was extradited to the US. In 2019, he was sentenced to life in prison plus 30 years.

== Arrest ==
Guzmán and a lieutenant escaped through a secret tunnel, emerging 1.5 kilometres (0.93 mi) away and stealing an automobile at gunpoint.

A statewide alert was issued for the stolen vehicle, and the Federal Police located and intercepted it about 20 kilometres (12 mi) south of Los Mochis near the town of Juan José Ríos. Guzmán attempted to bribe the policemen with offers of cash, properties, and offers of jobs. When the policemen refused, Guzmán told them "you are all going to die". The four policemen sent pictures of Guzmán to their superiors, who were tipped that 40 assassins were on their way to free Guzmán. To avoid this counter-attack by cartel members, the policemen were told to take their prisoners to a motel on the outskirts of town to wait for reinforcements, and later, hand over the prisoners to Mexico City.

== See also ==
- Manhunt for Joaquín Guzmán
- Operation Sinaloa
- 2026 Jalisco operation, similar event
- Capture of El Mayo
- Facing El Chapo, a 2026 Netflix film about the event
