= Manhunt of El Chapo =

Search for Mexican drug baron

Manhunt of Joaquín "El Chapo" Guzmán
- Part of the war on drugs and the Mexican drug war
- Picture of Guzmán while in prison (1993)
- Type: Strategic offensive
- Planned by: Mexico; United States; INTERPOL
- Target: Joaquín "El Chapo" Guzmán
- Date: 19 January 2001 – 22 February 2014
- Outcome: Successful; target re-arrested in 2014; he later escaped in 2015 and was re-arrested again 2016

Joaquín "El Chapo" Guzmán, the former leader of the Sinaloa Cartel, dodged international manhunt for more than a decade after escaping from a maximum-security prison in the Mexican state of Jalisco in 2001. Throughout his criminal career following his escape, Guzmán was pursued all across Mexico and abroad, and went from being an average-level drug lord to arguably the world's most-wanted man. Mexico offered MXN$30 million (about US$2.3 million) for his capture, while the United States offered up to US$5 million for information leading to his arrest and conviction. In 1993, he was arrested and imprisoned for murder and drug trafficking, facing a 20-year sentence. Fearing his extradition to the U.S., Guzmán fled from prison by reportedly hiding in a laundry cart in 2001. He quickly reincorporated back in the Sinaloa Cartel while authorities continued their manhunt to re-arrest him.

While on the run, Guzmán reportedly travelled with a large entourage of armed bodyguards equivalent to those of a head of state, using a vast surveillance network and bullet-proof cars, aircraft, and all-terrain vehicles to avoid capture. His elusiveness helped him craft a near-mythical persona and image in some parts of Mexico; alleged eyewitnesses accounts abound that Guzmán would enter restaurants with his gunmen, order all cell phones and devices confiscated, proceed to calmly enjoy his meal, and subsequently paying the tab for every customer in the restaurant upon departing. His whereabouts were a subject of Mexican folklore, with reports and rumors circulating that he was in many parts of Mexico, especially in an area known as the "Golden Triangle", a drug-producing region in the Sierra Madre mountains where Guzmán grew up.

By late 2013, authorities began to penetrate Guzmán's security inner circle by arresting several of his top lieutenants. Through informant tips, wiretap phone calls, and confessions from his close associates, Mexican security forces got closer to his whereabouts. After more than 13 years on the run, he was finally arrested by the Mexican Navy in a beach resort area in Mazatlán, Sinaloa, on 22 February 2014. Many Mexicans compared his capture with the fall of Colombia's drug lord Pablo Escobar, the capture of Saddam Hussein, and even the death of Osama bin Laden. However, on July 11, 2015, Guzmán escaped from prison again through a tunnel inside his prison cell, but was caught six months after his escape and was extradited to the U.S.

== Vicente Fox administration: 2000–2006 ==
=== Arrest and prison escape: 1993–2001 ===
On 9 June 1993, Joaquín "El Chapo" Guzmán, the former leader of the Sinaloa Cartel, was arrested in Guatemala following a massive manhunt to arrest him and other drug traffickers involved in the murder of the Mexican cardinal Juan Jesús Posadas Ocampo (who was mistakenly killed by the Tijuana Cartel during an attack aimed at Guzmán). Following his arrest, he was extradited to Mexico and imprisoned at the Federal Social Readaptation Center No. 1 (often referred to simply as "La Palma" or "Altiplano"), a maximum-security prison in Almoloya de Juárez, State of Mexico. On 22 November 1995, he was transferred to the maximum security prison Federal Social Readaptation Center No. 2 (also known as "Puente Grande") in Jalisco. He was sentenced to 20 years in prison, but while he lived in Puente Grande, Guzmán enjoyed a comfortable lifestyle; he had most of the people working in the prison under his payroll, ordered the meals he wanted from a menu, continued his illicit activities through cellphone, enjoyed sporadic visits from prostitutes, among other benefits. However, under fears of being extradited to the United States for pending charges on drug trafficking, Guzmán orchestrated his escape from Puente Grande. On 19 January 2001, his electronically secured cell was opened and Guzmán was reportedly escorted by a prison guard outside of Puente Grande while hidden in a laundry cart. The security cameras of the prison were disabled on his way out, and Guzmán became a free man.

Guzmán was driven out of the prison by Francisco Javier Camberos Rivera (alias "El Chito"), one of the prison guards, and headed to Guadalajara. In the car, Guzmán sat in the passenger seat and urged Camberos Rivera that both of them were better off fleeing together, given that the manhunt to re-arrest him would also include his accomplice. When they were outside the city, Guzmán asked him to stop at a gasoline station because he said he was thirsty and wanted a bottle of water. Camberos Rivera got off the vehicle, went into the shop, and bought the water. When he came back to the car, Guzmán was gone. At 11:35 p.m. that day, the prison warden Leonardo Beltrán Santana was notified that Guzmán's cell was empty, and chaos within the prison ensued. The prison staff searched in every cell, room, and closet to no avail. When the news of Guzmán's escape reached the newspaper headlines, the Mexican government vowed to launch a national manhunt to bring him behind bars again and to punish those responsible for allowing him to escape.

In the nearby communities close to the prison, the Mexican Army searched for Guzmán; they raided houses, ranches, and even government buildings, but they did not find traces of the drug lord. In Guadalajara, security forces raided a house of one of Guzmán's associates, confiscating weapons, drugs, phones, computers, and thousands of dollars in cash, but they did not find their target. Anonymous tips led authorities to Manzanillo, Colima, which led to raids in seventeen houses and four ranches. Guzmán, however, was nowhere to be found. Within days of the escape, it was clear to the Mexican government that Guzmán was no longer hiding in the surrounding areas. The manhunt was then extended nationwide, with hundreds of police officers and soldiers scattered across Mexico, from major cities to the tiniest rural communities. After meeting with other Sinaloa Cartel leaders a few months after his escape, Guzmán re-emerged and was eager to prove that his time in prison had not softened his personality and that his position and status among the cartel hierarchy was stronger than before. He spent most of 2001 transversing numerous hideouts all across Mexico, acclimating quickly to his new lifestyle as a high-profile drug lord on the run.

=== Continued manhunts ===
In March 2001, authorities discovered that Guzmán was hiding at a ranch known as Los Limones in Santa Fe, Nayarit. Soldiers raided the property but the drug lord had escaped beforehand, reportedly via helicopter. In August 2001, he was detected near La Marquesa in Mexico City. In November 2001, Guzmán was reported to have lived in Puebla with his wife Griselda López Pérez and in Cuernavaca. According to police reports, Guzmán and his wife were under the protection of Jesús Castro Pantoja, an ex-policeman in charge of the drug lord's security logistics; and Juan Mauro Palomares (alias "El Trece"), another Sinaloa Cartel member and associate of Guzmán. From Puebla he moved back to Mexico City before hiding at a mountainous community known as Tohayana in Sinaloa. It was there federal agents believed that Guzmán began to make business connections with South American drug traffickers. In the first week of September 2001, Mexican authorities reported that Guzmán was living between Toluca and the state of Nayarit. He managed to escape arrest after the extinct Federal Preventive Police (PFP) intercepted a vehicle carrying Arturo Guzmán Loera (alias "El Pollo"), one of Guzmán's brothers. In one of the other vehicles in the convoy was Guzmán, who managed to escape the scene. One of the henchmen arrested with Arturo was allowed to make a phone call while detained, allowing Guzmán to escape from a safe house he was hiding in Zinacantepec, State of Mexico, where he lived from June to September 2011. The Mexican authorities had several follow-ups on Guzmán's whereabouts since previous months; through phone taps, they concluded that the drug lord was residing in the Toluca Valley. That year, the Centro de Investigación y Seguridad Nacional (CISEN), Mexico's intelligence agency, conducted an investigation among several State of Mexico functionaries to determine if any of them were collaborating with Guzmán.

In 2002, he was reported to have been at Campeche in southern Mexico; in Tamaulipas in the northeast; in the state of Sonora in the northwest; and in Mexico City, the country's capital. On 14 June 2002, federal agents believed that Guzmán and Mayo Zambada were hiding at Las Quintas neighborhood in Culiacán. When the authorities got to the area, they surrounded the houses with over 200 federal policemen, only to discover Zambada's ex-wife and daughter. About a month later on 2 July 2002, informants notified federal agents that the drug lord was hiding at the Condado de Sayavedra neighborhood in Atizapán, State of Mexico. Like in the other occurrences, Guzmán was not found. On 22 August 2003, rumors spread that Guzmán had been captured in Monterrey, Nuevo León; Mexico's Attorney General Rafael Macedo de la Concha denied the allegations. That same day but in Manzanillo, Colima, other versions circulated that Guzmán had been captured, but they turned out to be false.

In 2004, the Mexican Army discovered that Guzmán and Zambada hosted a large social event in Badiraguato, Sinaloa and were heading via truck to Tamazula, Durango. A terrestrial operation to capture the drug lord would have taken hours given the dirt tracks that led to the area where Guzmán was located. Instead, the Army sent in the Mexican Air Force to surprise him. As helicopters soared on top of the ranch, Guzmán and his men escaped by foot. Soldiers descended from the choppers and arrested the employees working at the ranch, but Guzmán was nowhere to be found. According to local journalists who consulted the police, the operative was carried out to merely scare away Guzmán, not to apprehend him. In November 2004, soldiers raided another of Guzmán's ranches north of La Tuna, Badiraguato, after they detected his voice through a satellite phone line they had been tapping for several months. When they got to the location, Guzmán had escaped—they were about ten minutes late from capturing him. At the scene the soldiers confiscated several belongings from the drug lord, including laptops with new photographs of Guzmán. The pictures proved that the drug lord had been at that ranch, and showed that he sported a new mustache and had gained more weight after escaping from prison. Outraged for failing to capture him, the soldiers lit Guzmán's vehicles on fire and destroyed the property. Mexican authorities blamed infiltrated informants for passing down information to Guzmán and helping him escape, but critics noted that the drug lord had successfully avoided arrest because there were no serious efforts to apprehend him and that the government was faking attempts to capture Guzmán.

=== Public appearances ===
One Saturday evening in May 2005, Guzmán reportedly appeared at a restaurant in Nuevo Laredo, Tamaulipas escorted by several of his gunmen. After closing the doors of the restaurant, the drug lord warned the 40 customers that they were not allowed to leave the place or use electronic devices until he finished dinner. To make up for the inconvenience, however, Guzmán picked up the tab for all of the customers in the restaurant. In November 2005, Guzmán was supposedly seen in Culiacán, Sinaloa repeating the same exploit he had done months before; according to an eyewitness, the drug lord arrived at Las Palmas, an eatery in one of the city's busy streets, with 15 of his bodyguards—all of them sporting AK-47 assault rifles. A man told those present the following:

"Gentlemen, please. Give me a moment of your time. A man is going to come in, the boss. We will ask you to remain in your seats; the doors will be closed and nobody is allowed to leave. You will also not be allowed to use your cellulars. Do not worry; if you do everything that is asked of you, nothing will happen. Continue eating and don't ask for your check. The boss will pay. Thank you."

Following this statement, Guzmán entered through the front door of the restaurant and walked through the tables, greeting the customers. "Hello, nice to meet you. How are you? I'm Joaquín Guzmán Loera. A pleasure. At your service," he said, shaking their hands. The drug lord then retreated to one of the restaurant's private rooms, where he ate his favorite steak dish. After a few hours, Guzmán finished his dinner and left the scene through the back door. His gunmen departed minutes later. The customers soon discovered that their tabs had been paid by Guzmán. When asked about the incident, however, the restaurant owner denied the story and stated that the drug lord was never there. Such stories, whether true or false, created a mystique surrounding Guzmán.

=== Final months: 2006 ===
During the last days of the administration of President Vicente Fox (2000–2006), General Rolando Eugenio Hidalgo Eddy was appointed at the 9th Military Zone with clear orders to capture Guzmán. Within a few months in office, the General managed to arrest one of Guzmán's top money launderers and raided several towns and airstrips thought to be owned by Guzmán. Although he received death threats from organized criminals, he went for Guzmán's family. In one operation led by him, soldiers raided one of the ranches owned by María Consuelo Loera Pérez, the drug lord's mother. Intelligence reports mentioned that Guzmán had visited his mother in La Tuna, Badiraguato. When the soldiers arrived, the drug lord had already escaped; after not finding any evidence of criminal activities, the soldiers allegedly trashed the property, according to some local eyewitness accounts. Guzmán purposely carried out a defamation campaign against the General to win public support. Locals, accused of supporting the drug lord, marched in Culiacán and wrote a petition to the President and the local human rights commission asking for the abuses to stop. Authorities dismissed the accusations as a tactic employed by Guzmán. Locals, on the other hand, denied the accusations. In August 2006, he commanded an operation that led to the capture of Guzmán's nephew Luis Alberto Cano Zepeda in Durango. Guzmán responded by disposing the corpse of a man outside of the General's headquarters. Guzmán's escape from prison in the Fox administration marked an embarrassing episode for the government, which carried out several efforts to re-arrest the drug lord. However, Guzmán managed to remain a fugitive throughout the whole political administration and into Calderón's presidency, which began in December 2006.

== Felipe Calderón administration: 2006–2012 ==
In the administration of President Felipe Calderón (2006–December 2012), Guzmán's capture was a top priority for the Mexican government. However, he managed to remain a fugitive throughout this administration. Ten days after taking office on 11 December 2006, Calderón carried out a military campaign to dismantle the drug trafficking groups in the state of Michoacán, marking the start of the Mexican drug war.

In 2006, hidden security cameras spotted Guzmán riding an SUV in the rural areas of Durango. When the police and the Mexican Army arrived at the area, he had escaped. On 2 July 2007, Guzmán married former beauty pageant winner Emma Coronel Aispuro in La Angostura, Canelas, Durango. The authorities raided the area the following day, but the newly married couple had already left. One version states that they left to Colombia; other sources state that they went to a new home Guzmán owned in the mountains. In October 2007, media outlets reported that Guzmán had been captured in Sinaloa de Leyva, Sinaloa following a military raid. The information was later confirmed to be just a rumor. Manhunts on behalf of the General continued throughout his tenure in Sinaloa until 2008, when he departed from his post, without much success. In every occasion, Guzmán was elusive and avoided being detained.

On 25 March 2008, a massive shootout in Guatemala's border with El Salvador reached the headlines in Mexico; local media outlets reported that among the eleven dead was Guzmán. Two of the bodies were calcined, and Guatemalan authorities issued DNA samples to determine whether the Sinaloa Cartel kingpin was one of them, given that the Guatemalan authorities confirmed that there was one Mexican citizen among the casualties. As Mexico anticipated the news, Guatemala's President Álvaro Colom clarified that Guzmán had not been killed. After meeting with investigators, he said, they concluded that the drug lord was possibly hiding in Honduras. On the evening of 17 May 2008, Guzmán reportedly ate at the Aroma restaurant in Ciudad Juárez, Chihuahua. According to eyewitnesses, around fifty of his henchmen arrived at the restaurant and ordered the diners to hand over their electronic devices and remain seated while Guzmán had dinner with several unknown companions. After eating, Guzmán ordered his henchmen to return the confiscated devices, paid everyone's tab, and left the establishment. Days later in an apparent revenge attack, rival gangsters of the Juárez Cartel set the restaurant on fire.

On 20 May 2008, Mexican authorities conducted several operations in Irapuato, San Miguel de Allende, and in Dolores Hidalgo, Guanajuato after suspicions that Guzmán was residing in that state. In the first week of September 2008, Guzmán reportedly ate at the Barroca hotel-restaurant in Piedras Negras, Coahuila with an unidentified man known as "El Yerno". On 15 September 2008, Mexico's Independence Day, Guzmán reportedly visited Badiraguato, Sinaloa to take a look at his marijuana plantations and deliveries as a helicopter overlooked the area. The Secretariat of National Defense stated on 11 August 2009 that Guzmán may have lived inside a drug laboratory in Tamazula, Durango for some time, following a raid conducted by Mexican security forces.

=== Mexico's most-wanted list: 2009 ===
In 2009, the Federal government of Mexico released a list of its 37 most-wanted drug lords, offering monetary rewards for anyone who could provide information that would lead to their arrests. Mexico offered up to MXN$30 million (about U.S.$2.1 million) for Guzmán's capture, while the United States government offered up to U.S.$5 million for information leading to his arrest and conviction. The Mexican government also offered up to MXN$15 million (about U.S.$1 million) for information leading to the arrest of the high-ranking associates of the traffickers on the list, which included members of the Gulf Cartel, Los Zetas, Juárez Cartel, La Familia Michoacana, Beltrán Leyva Cartel, Tijuana Cartel, and the Sinaloa Cartel. Guzmán, however, was placed at the top of the list.

=== Continued manhunts: 2009–2012 ===
On 26 January 2009, U.S. authorities discovered that Guzmán met at a conclave in Sonoyta, Sonora with several of his associates to discuss the cartel's drug trafficking operations. According to documents provided by the Arizona Department of Public Safety, Guzmán stated to those present that they had to defend the cartel's drug shipments at all costs, even if it required an armed standoff with Mexican or U.S. law enforcement. On April 17, 2009, in the state of Durango, Roman Catholic Archbishop Héctor González said in an interview that "everyone [knew]" that Guzmán lived in Guanaceví, Durango, "except the authorities, who just [did not] happen to see him for some reason." Supporters of President Calderón reduced the Archbishop's comments as careless, while others lauded the remarks, stating that the government was either incapable or too corrupt to go after the drug lord. In an interview the following year, the clergyman stated that "[Guzmán was] omnipresent. ... He [was] everywhere." He also said that there were rumors that the drug lord owned several properties in the rural community of San Andrés del Teul in Jiménez del Teul, Zacatecas. A few days after the Archbishop's remarks, two undercover military officers disguised as marijuana planters were killed by organized crime in Durango. Alongside their corpse was a written message that read: "You'll never get Chapo".

In May 2009, Guzmán reportedly ate at a restaurant in the state of Durango, where he asked the diners to put away their cellphones and cameras, and told them that no one was allowed to leave until him and his entourage were gone. He told everyone present, however, to order anything they wanted from the menu. On 8 August 2009, the Mexican Army deployed their troops to Jesús María, Culiacán after their received a tip that Guzmán had plans to visit the tomb of his son Édgar Guzmán López, who had been killed a year earlier. The soldiers guarded the surrounding area for twenty-four hours. With Guzmán still absent, the Army deployed two choppers to oversee the area and several soldiers on foot to search the town. Guzmán, however, never showed up. On 24 February 2010, Honduran intelligence reports indicated that Guzmán was making sporadic visits to El Paraíso, Copán to take some time off from the day-to-day operations of his cartel and to rest from the pressure of law enforcement in Mexico. The reports were based on informants' testimonies that indicated that there was a man in the area who had attended a party with Mexican musical groups and who fit the description of the drug lord. The Honduran authorities, however, reiterated that they did not believe Guzmán's permanent residence was in Honduras. According to court documents, Assistant U.S. Attorney Donald Feith said that in April 2014, an FBI informant met with Guzmán at a disclosed location in a montaneous region in Mexico. The informant met with him because he was introduced by Jesús Manuel Gutiérrez Guzmán (Guzmán's cousin), a former Sinaloa Cartel representative in the U.S. The meeting was not recorded and only involved Guzmán and the FBI informant. Following a supposed operation led by the Mexican Navy in the rural community of Alchichica in the municipality of Tepeyahualco, Puebla, rumors spread on social media that Guzmán had been arrested on 14 October 2010. The rumors of his arrest turned out to be false.

Investigators believe that the drug lord lived in Argentina from August 2010 to March 2011 and was accompanied by an unidentified female and his stepdaughter. Following a lead conducted by the Drug Enforcement Administration (DEA) that called for his arrest, Guzmán reportedly went to the Ezeiza International Airport in Buenos Aires and flew to Paraguay, Colombia, and then to Europe using a false name. It was not clear if Guzmán travelled in the same plane with the woman and the girl. The authorities speculate that they did travel together. In Argentina, Guzmán reportedly conducted drug trafficking shipments and met with regional drug lords in Buenos Aires, Santa Fe, and Córdoba to further extend the Sinaloa Cartel's presence in South America. The drug lord hid in poor Argentinian neighborhoods and laundered money there; such actions helped him gain the trust of some locals, investigators say. In April 2011, an anonymous top official working for the DEA said to the media that Guzmán was living in Durango and hiding in a mountainous area "like Osama bin Laden". The official said that the area where Guzmán lived was a "very difficult terrain", and that the drug lord knew all the locals who lived in the surrounding area. He then said that any outsiders or suspicious activities were easily detected by them.

During Holy Week in 2011, Guatemalan authorities confirmed that Guzmán was reportedly seen in Puerto Barrios, Guatemala, and admitted that he had frequented the country and Honduras. In August 2011, a newspaper in Veracruz reported that Guzmán had moved to the state and was seen by several locals at a famous restaurant in the port city of Veracruz, Veracruz. According to the story, his gunmen entered the restaurant and asked those present to hand over their electronic devices. Once they had done this, Guzmán entered the restaurant and apologized for the inconvenience. He then had dinner, paid the tab for all the diners present in the restaurant, left a large tip for the waiters, and left the premises. In September 2011, there were reports among authorities that Guzmán and one of his sons were in Bolivia. His son was reportedly taking aviation classes at El Trompillo Airport in Santa Cruz.

==== Final months ====
On 21 February 2012, the Mexican Federal Police—acting on intelligence information provided by U.S. law enforcement—raided a mansion in Los Cabos, Baja California Sur in an attempt to capture Guzmán. Intelligence reports indicated that Guzmán was staying at the premises temporarily, and that he had plans to meet with a sex worker who was hired by his intermediaries to offer her services. When he arrived at the house, however, the sex worker notified Guzmán that she was menstruating; he rescheduled an appointment for another day and left promptly. Four people were arrested (the sex worker, a gardener, a chef, and one of Guzmán's pilots) when the Mexican authorities raided the mansion a few days later. They believe that if Guzmán had not cancelled the appointment, he would have been arrested at the scene. The near-arrest of Guzmán reached international headlines, but suspicions and worries that there was someone tipping him off with information from law enforcement mounted. Following the raid, Guzmán hid in another resort area by blending in with other vacationers. Authorities searched for the drug lord in Los Cabos for three more days. Realizing that his Blackberry cellphone had been traced down by law enforcement, Guzmán handed it over to one of his subordinates. The Mexican security forces, unaware that Guzmán had realized his phone had been identified, continued to pursue the signal until they arrested the subordinate. By the time this had happened, Guzmán had already made his way to the desert, where a private jet flew him to his hideout in the Sierra Madre region. (Note: Nearly a year later in February 2013, however, a Mexican newspaper investigation found that there was no record of the attempted capture of Guzmán in law enforcement databases. The only records available were operatives near the premises in Los Cabos days after the alleged raid took place.)

After the incident in Los Cabos, Guzmán reinstated a different network to communicate with his subordinates. If his men needed to communicate with him through text message, the message would first be sent to a trusted lieutenant at a public wireless network. Upon receiving the text, that person would type it into an iPad in order to send it via WiFi and avoid detection from law enforcement. The message would then be sent to a second intermediary who would write the message on his cellphone and send it to Guzmán through public WiFi. This made it difficult for authorities to penetrate his communication network, given that Guzmán's cellphone only connected with another device. If he replied, the message would be relayed through the same procedures. This method is sometimes known as the "mirror system", and it is difficult to penetrate because it uses public WiFi areas and different intermediaries to transcribe messages. However, the DEA managed to decipher the communication pattern and decided to focus on targeting the operators in Guzmán's ring in order to identify the mirrors and eventually reach him.

A video of a man who appeared to be Guzmán surfaced on the Blog del Narco website on 10 April 2012. In the clip, Guzmán, wearing a white shirt, dark pants, and a cap, appears interrogating a man (apparently a kidnapped victim) about rival drug traffickers in the state of Sinaloa, particularly in the areas of Mazatlán, Los Mochis, and Los Limones. The video lasts for about two minutes and was received anonymously via e-mail by the Blog del Narco. It is unknown when and where the video was filmed, or why Guzmán himself was leading the interrogation. (Note: In the interrogation, the unidentified man suggests that the video was filmed in Los Limones, a rural community in the municipality of Mazatlán, Sinaloa.) Given that Guzmán was characterized for his elusiveness and low-profile status, it is possible that the video was filmed without his permission. That same month, confidential reports from anonymous officials in Mexican and U.S. governments stating that the Pentagon had plans to send the U.S. Navy SEALs to capture or kill Guzmán in Mexico were leaked to the media. The plan was reportedly elaborated by the U.S. government and initially accepted by Calderón. However, the President faced objections from the top echelons of the Mexican Armed Forces, who refused to accept the measures of the plan. The plan consisted of the following: the SEALs would be divided into three groups; two groups would attack by land, and the other one would stay airborne. In about 10 to 15 minutes, the land team would raid the property where Guzmán was located and attempt to apprehend him. In case of resistance from Guzmán or his security circle, the SEALs would kill him and his men on the spot before taking the drug lord's body. The plan would be carried out only by U.S. authorities, excluding the Mexican Armed Forces and other officials altogether. The refusal of the Mexican Armed Forces in accepting the plan, however, halted its execution.

Throughout Calderón's administration, critics accused his government of favoring the Sinaloa Cartel and protecting Guzmán while it went after its rivals, especially Los Zetas. Rumors and conspiracy theories that Guzmán enjoyed a level of protection or favoritism from the Calderón administration were rooted in the fact that data showed that Mexican authorities were capturing more drug cartel leaders from criminal organizations other than Guzmán's Sinaloa Cartel. It was also rooted in the fact that people perceived that the government was not carrying out real efforts to capture him. In the wake of the 2012 presidential elections and in the final months of the Calderón administration, suspicions that the government was planning a potential ploy of capturing Guzmán to boost Calderón's National Action Party (PAN) popularity were widely discussed in talk shows and opinion polls. The reasoning went that capturing Guzmán would make the PAN soar in popularity before elections. At the same time, the capture could have ignited more controversy, as it would imply that the government kept Guzmán at bay until they saw it convenient to arrest him. However, Guzmán was not arrested, and continued to exert his influence in the criminal underworld and extend the Sinaloa Cartel's reach to global proportions.

== Enrique Peña Nieto administration: 2012–2014 ==
In December 2012, Enrique Peña Nieto of the Institutional Revolutionary Party (PRI) became the President of Mexico. During his presidential campaign and into his term, Peña Nieto vowed to reduce the violence in Mexico by refocusing the strategy against organized crime and prioritizing to lower murders, kidnappings, and extortion, as opposed to simply relying on the so-called "kingpin strategy", which focuses on taking down the leaders of the drug trafficking groups. Rumors persisted, however, that the new government had plans to arrange a truce with organized crime to reduce the violence and give accommodations to top drug kingpins like Guzmán. Peña Nieto and the PRI government rejected the notion that they would negotiate with criminals in exchange for relative peace. In his term, the military-led offensive against Mexico's drug cartels continued while Guzmán remained a fugitive.

On 21 February 2013, it was reported that Guzmán was killed in a gun fight with Guatemalan security forces near the border between Guatemala and Mexico, in the town of San Francisco, El Petén. Police stated two suspected criminals were killed in the fire exchange, and that one of the corpse that was found inside a truck resembled Guzmán's physical appearance. Later that same day, however, Guatemalan authorities were not sure if the shooting had even occurred. The authorities later dismissed the rumors after the body was not found. The Guatemalan government issued an apology for the misleading information. The blunder occurred because the Guatemalan authorities relied entirely on reports from villagers who said they had seen the incident. However, officials later recognized that there were contradictions in the eye-witness testimonies. Wikileaks reports indicated that Guzmán was hiding in Petén days prior to this mistake. On 12 May 2013, the DEA stated they believed Guzmán and his former business partner Ismael "El Mayo" Zambada were in the region of northern Baja California and southern California. In November 2013, Honduras Vice-Minister of Defense Roberto Funes stated in a press interview that Guzmán was possibly hiding in Honduras. The interview continued with Funes talking about drug trafficking in Honduras, but he did not say why he believed Guzmán was hiding there. The DEA spokesperson Rusty Payne refused to comment on Guzmán's whereabouts, but Woodrow Wilson Center expert Eric Olson said that it was possible that the drug lord was hiding in Honduras, given its institutional weakness and porous borders. However, there was no clear evidence that the drug lord had left Mexico.

Between 15 November and 20 November 2013, Mexican media outlets reported that the DEA had discovered, through radio conversations between drug traffickers, that Guzmán was admitted to a private hospital in Jalisco after suffering a heart attack. The exact medical center that the drug lord reportedly attended is unknown (though they believe it was likely at the San Javier Hospitals in Zapopan or Guadalajara). Authorities believe that Guzmán used a fake identity when he checked in for a brief check up. Mexican officials investigated several clinics in Manzanillo, Colima and in the Guadalajara area, though their efforts to get a lead to Guzmán were unsuccessful. This report, though it did not provide any leads on his whereabouts, served to reinforce the rumors that Guzmán had health problems, given that other reports suggested that he had experienced some weight loss and was exercising regularly. Intelligence reports suggested that Guzmán suffered from diabetes and heart disease.

Although his whereabouts were unknown, the authorities believed that he was likely hiding in the "Golden Triangle" (Spanish: Triángulo Dorado), an area that encompasses parts of Sinaloa, Durango, and Chihuahua in the Sierra Madre region. The region is a major producer of marijuana and opium poppy in Mexico, and its remoteness from the urban areas makes it an attractive territory for the production of synthetic drugs in clandestine labs and for its mountains that serve as possible hideouts. Guzmán reportedly commanded a sophisticated security circle of at least 300 informants and gunmen resembling the manpower equivalent to those of a head of state. His inner circle would help him move around through several isolated ranches in the mountainous area and avoid capture. He usually escaped from law enforcement using bullet-proof cars, aircraft, and all-terrain vehicles, and was known to employ sophisticated communications gadgetry and counterespionage practices.

Since many of these locations in the Golden Triangle can only be reached through single-track dirt roads, local residents easily detect the arrival of law enforcement or any outsider. Their distrust towards non-residents and their aversion towards the government, alongside a combination of bribery and intimidation, helped keep the locals loyal to Guzmán and the Sinaloa Cartel in the area. According to law enforcement intelligence, attempting to have launched an attack to capture Guzmán via air would have issued similar results; his security circle would have notified the presence of an aircraft 10 minutes away from Guzmán's location, giving him ample time to escape the scene and avoid arrest. In addition, his gunmen reportedly carried surface-to-air missiles that may bring down aircraft in the area.

=== Closing in on Guzmán: 2013–2014 ===
For more than 13 years, Guzmán hid across Mexico and in the Sierra Madre while other drug lords from other organized crime groups were arrested or killed. His elusiveness from law enforcement made him a near-legendary figure in Mexico's narco folklore. However, by 2013, law enforcement began to penetrate his inner circle by taking down some of his top lieutenants; in November 2013, the DEA arrested Zambada's son Serafín Zambada Ortiz at the border crossing in Nogales, Arizona as part of an extensive drug case. His arrest was important for law enforcement to penetrate the top echelons of Guzmán's cartel. A month later in Sonora state, Mexican security forces gunned down Gonzalo Inzunza Inzunza (alias "El Macho Prieto"), a top lieutenant of the Sinaloa Cartel and business partner of Zambada.

Less than two weeks after that, the Netherlands police arrested José Rodrigo Aréchiga Gamboa (alias "El Chino Ántrax"), the leader of the Sinaloa's assassins squad Los Ántrax and a top logistics chief for Guzmán, as he arrived from Mexico City at the Amsterdam Airport Schiphol. With his arrest, U.S. authorities began to understand how the leaders of the Sinaloa Cartel moved and communicated. The DEA learned through wiretap phone calls, texts, and emails after the arrest that Guzmán had plans to travel to Culiacán for a family reunion with his Alfredo and Iván Archivaldo Guzmán Salazar, both who were close to Aréchiga Gamboa. The Mexican Navy, acting on intelligence from the DEA, assembled at a military base in Los Cabos and formed the so-called Operation Gargoyle (Spanish: Operación Gárgola), the code-name given for the operation that pursued Guzmán. In order to avoid attention, the Navy placed one of its ships off the Baja California coast in Los Cabos as a decoy. They wanted to distract those around by making them think that the presence of the Navy was due to a regular naval exercise. However, with the informant system that characterized Guzmán in the past, it was believed that the drug lord was aware of the Navy's presence in the area.

Intelligence information collected by Mexican and U.S. authorities in 2014 stated that Guzmán was beginning to gradually change his lifestyle as an outlaw. They believed that Guzmán was venturing to Culiacán and other urban areas from the Sierra Madre mountains more often than usual because he was tired of the austere life in the countryside and wanted to enjoy his wealth more comfortably. Other authorities speculated that his wife Emma Coronel Aispuro, who was much younger than Guzmán, was not used to the countryside. Adding to the fact that the couple had twin daughters, his wife was adamant that Guzmán spend more time with them. Guzmán also wished to enjoy other benefits not readily available in the countryside, like gourmet foods (which explains why he was spotted at restaurants in the past).

On 6 February 2014, Mexican authorities believed that Guzmán had lunch at Mar and Sea restaurant (formerly known as El Farallón) in Culiacán. However, intelligence reports later indicated that it was not him but his son Iván Archivaldo who was at the sea food restaurant. In the operation, the Mexican Navy surrounded the premises and entered the restaurant in search of their target. At the parking lot, the soldiers searched inside the diners' vehicles. Iván Archivaldo, however, managed to escape the scene by reportedly disguising as a waiter.

==== Final days ====
On 12 February 2014, the PGR arrested high-ranking Sinaloa Cartel chief Daniel Fernández Domínguez (alias "El Pelacas") in Puebla, Puebla. His arrest was a major break in Guzmán's inner circle; at the time of his arrest, Fernández had 20 cellphones with several contacts having the Sinaloa dialing code. Investigators concluded that several of the numbers on the cellphones were from other high-ranking members of Zambada's personnel. Two days following his arrest, Mexican authorities carried out several raids in Sinaloa's countryside and in Culiacán. On 13 February 2014, the PGR, Federal Police, and the Mexican Navy arrested Sinaloa Cartel chief Joel Enrique Sandoval Romero (alias "El 19") and four of his associates. Sandoval Romero, according to Mexican authorities, was the assassin and security chief of Zambada in Sinaloa. One of the detainees said that one of the numbers of the cellphones they had belonged to Guzmán. That number was then used by law enforcement to trace his presence in Culiacán. On 16 February 2014, U.S. authorities tracked down the cellphone of Carlos Manuel Hoo Ramírez (alias "El Cóndor"), Guzmán's chief of communications. With such information they were able to track down other facilitators and identify a stash house before giving the information to Mexican security forces. Intelligence information began to focus on Mario Hidalgo Argüello (alias "El Nariz"), a man who formed part of Guzmán's inner circle as his personal assistant.

On the night of 16 February 2014, Guzmán arrived at a property owned by his ex-wife Griselda Pérez López in Culiacán and ordered Hidalgo Argüello to pick up his dinner at a local restaurant. After his shift, he returned to his home in Culiacán and was arrested by Mexican authorities at his doorstep. After an interrogation, he provided law enforcement with information of Guzmán's whereabouts in Culiacán and pinpointed several addresses. In the city, Guzmán rarely spent more than a day in a single property; he rotated each day to different ones to avoid arrest and did not tell those in his inner circle of his whereabouts until they were en route. On 17 February 2014, the property of Guzmán's ex-wife at the Colinas de San Miguel neighborhood was raided by Mexican security forces. Several belongings were destroyed, but Guzmán was not found.

Before dawn that day, Guzmán turned on his cellphone to make a call asking for help to get out of Culiacán. Law enforcement tracked the signal to a property at the Libertad neighborhood and made their way to arrest him. When the Navy tried to break down the door, they discovered that the front door was steel-reinforced; in addition to that, the door was custom-made with water on its inside in order to prevent the door from breaking down by heat. The authorities hammered the door for roughly ten minutes until they gained access to the safe house. They initially made their way to the kitchen and into other windowless rooms. There were security cameras and monitors throughout the house, but there were no signs of anyone there. When they reached the bathroom, they discovered that the bathtub had been raised with hydraulic lifts and that there was a set of stairs that led to a hidden tunnel. Guzmán was inside the domicile with Hoo Ramírez and a female cook known as La Chapis when the Navy arrived, but the steel door gave them ample time to escape through the tunnel. The Navy quickly made their way through the tunnel too, knowing that Guzmán had only a slight start advantage on them. The tunnel then reached a small portal that connected with the entire sewage system of Culiacán. Authorities continued their expedition through the tunnel without hesitation; in the streets, troops flooded the area in case Guzmán managed to escape by foot. Airborne was a covert U.S. drone that supervised the area and was readily available to notify Mexican authorities if the drug lord escaped through a manhole. Meanwhile, Guzmán made his way through the sewage system and eventually the Navy was unable to keep track of the pursuit. They discovered a tactical vest in one path and continued in that direction. They eventually reached a stopping point at a storm drain near a river, more than a mile from their starting point. Guzmán, once again, had managed to escape.

Following the failed operation, Mexican authorities arrested Mario López Osorio (alias "El Picudo"), a close associate of Guzmán. Like the other arrested lieutenants, López Osorio was cooperative with law enforcement upon questioning, and stated that Guzmán and Hoo Ramírez had been picked up at a storm drain outside of Culiacán by him. He then said that he drove them south of Culiacán, where they were picked up by other aides in a different vehicle. Mexican authorities then raided the house of Hoo Ramírez in Culiacán but no one was there. On 20 February 2014, Mexican authorities arrested Jesús Peña González (alias "El 20"), a top Sinaloa Cartel enforcer and leader of Zambada's security circle. That same day, Hoo Ramírez turned on his cellphone and sent a text message to other Sinaloa Cartel members. Authorities tracked the signal to Mazatlán, Sinaloa and made their way to the city. In light of other occurrences, the authorities believed that Guzmán had already made his way to the Sierra Madre region. But they decided to head to Mazatlán anyway to attempt to capture Hoo Ramírez and squeeze Guzmán's inner circle even more.

=== Re-arrest: 2014 ===
On the evening of 21 February 2014, about forty soldiers of the Mexican Navy assembled in Mazatlán along with a small group of agents from the DEA, the U.S. Marshal Service, and the U.S. Department of Homeland Security. The marshals managed to pinpoint the signal of Hoo Ramírez's cellphone to Hotel Miramar, a twelve-story condominium complex at a beach resort area. Since geolocation technology cannot pinpoint the exact location of a signal, the Mexican authorities cordoned the area early in the morning of 22 February 2014. They later discovered at the hotel's registration office that two rooms had been rented the previous day. A team of Mexican soldiers made their way to one of the rooms of the sixth floor of Hotel Miramar and inadvertently discovered two sleeping U.S. tourists. At the same time on the fourth floor, a group of six soldiers made their way to Apartment #401, where they discovered Guzmán's bodyguard Hoo Ramírez guarding the entrance with an AK-47 assault rifle. Outnumbered, he surrendered his weapon while the authorities made their way into the apartment. In one of the bedrooms, the soldiers discovered Guzmán's chef and a babysitter, along with the drug lord's two daughters Mali and María Joaquina. In the other bedroom was Guzmán and his wife. No shots were fired, and in less than three minutes following the raid, Guzmán was arrested.

By the time of his arrest, Guzmán was regarded as the world's most-wanted criminal and as the top leader of the Sinaloa Cartel, a drug trafficking organization whose influence stretched across several continents. The news of the arrest was leaked to the press by anonymous U.S. law enforcement officials that same morning, and the story quickly was shared and reached international headlines. For many Mexicans, the arrest of Guzmán paralleled in importance to the killing of Pablo Escobar and even to the death of Osama bin Laden. Though the idea of Guzmán as a near-legendary criminal remained high, the arrest greatly reduced his status in Mexico's narco folklore more to a man than to a myth.

== Re-escape and arrest: 2015–2016 ==
On the evening of 11 July 2015, Guzmán escaped from the Federal Social Readaption Center No. 1 by going through a 1.5 kilometer tunnel found at the shower area in his cell.

== See also ==
- Operation Black Swan
- Facing El Chapo, a 2026 Netflix film about the event

== Sources ==
=== Bibliography ===
Beith, Malcolm (2010). The Last Narco: Inside the Hunt for El Chapo, the World's Most Wanted Drug Lord. Grove Press. ISBN 978-0802196224.

Bowden, Charles (2011). Murder City: Ciudad Juárez and the Global Economy's New Killing Fields. Nation Books. ISBN 978-1568586229.

Grayson, George W. (2011). Mexico: Narco-Violence and a Failed State?. Transaction Publishers. ISBN 978-1412815512.
