= The Bose Files: Sach Ya Sazish =

Upcoming Indian Hindi-language film

- Theatrical release poster
- Directed by: Rajesh Gupta
- Written by: Rajesh Gupta
- Produced by: Rajesh Gupta
- Starring: Yatin Karyekar; Rajesh Gupta; Apoorva Arora; Virendra Saxena; Akhilendra Mishra
- Edited by: Haarshavardhan Rajendra Jadhav
- Production company: Real Reels
- Distributed by: UFO Cine Media Network
- Release date: 30 July 2026
- Running time: 127 minutes
- Country: India
- Language: Hindi

The Bose Files: Sach Ya Sazish (transl. The Bose Files: Truth or Conspiracy) is a 2026 Indian Hindi-language historical investigative drama film written and directed by Rajesh Gupta. The film stars Yatin Karyekar as Netaji Subhas Chandra Bose, alongside Rajesh Gupta, Apoorva Arora, Virendra Saxena, Akhilendra Mishra, Amit Behl, and Akashdeep Arora.

The film is based on theories and investigations surrounding the disappearance of Indian independence leader Subhas Chandra Bose following the reported 1945 plane crash in Taiwan. It was released theatrically in India on 30 July 2026.

== Premise ==
The film follows Anuj Gupta, a journalist and researcher who has spent more than two decades studying documents related to Subhas Chandra Bose. Along with Veerali, a college student, he investigates official accounts of the 1945 Formosa plane crash while examining alternative theories regarding Bose's fate after 1945.

== Cast ==
- Yatin Karyekar as Netaji Subhas Chandra Bose
- Rajesh Gupta as Anuj Gupta, a journalist and researcher
- Apoorva Arora as Veerali, a college student
- Virendra Saxena
- Akhilendra Mishra
- Amit Behl
- Akashdeep Arora

== Production ==
The film was announced in 2026. According to the filmmakers, it is based on investigative research and published literature concerning the disappearance of Subhas Chandra Bose.

== Release ==
The film was initially scheduled for theatrical release on 31 July 2026. The release date was later changed to 30 July 2026.

== Reception ==
Archika Khurana of The Times of India gave the film 2.5 out of 5 stars, describing Karyekar's performance as one of the film's strengths while commenting that its treatment of the subject limited its cinematic impact.
