= Humberto Anguiano =

Mexican modern pentathlete

Personal information
- Full name: Heriberto Anguiano de la Fuente
- Born: 2 November 1910 Sayula, Jalisco, Mexico

Sport
- Sport: Modern pentathlon

Humberto Anguiano (born 2 November 1910, date of death unknown) was a Mexican modern pentathlete. He competed at the 1932 and 1936 Summer Olympics.
