= Facing El Chapo =

2026 drama film

- Spanish: La captura
- Directed by: Chava Cartas
- Written by: Bernardo Esquinca; Héctor de Mauleón
- Produced by: Francisco González Compeán; Sebastián Jurado
- Starring: Alfonso Herrera; Noé Hernández; Héctor Kotsifakis
- Music by: Victor Hernández Stumpfhauser
- Distributed by: Netflix
- Release date: August 21, 2026
- Running time: 91 minutes
- Country: Mexico
- Language: Spanish

Facing El Chapo (Spanish: La captura; transl. The Captured) is a 2026 Mexican action thriller film about the manhunt and subsequent recapture of Joaquín "El Chapo" Guzmán. The film follows Alfonso Herrera and Noé Hernández as the Federal Police officers who unexpectedly capture El Chapo, played by Héctor Kotsifakis. The film is based on real events.

== Plot ==
On January 8, 2016, during a Mexican Navy Special Force operation to capture "Cholo" Iván Gastélum—one of the Sinaloa Cartel's key hitmen—two Federal Police officers, Arturo Carmona and Héctor Rosales stopped a red Ford Focus that had been reported stolen while patrolling the streets of Los Mochis, Sinaloa. To their surprise, they discovered that one of the passengers was none other than ‘’El Chapo Guzmán”, leader of the fearsome Sinaloa Cartel.

After much debate—as the officers barely knew or trusted each other—Carmona and Rosales sent a photo of El Chapo to Commander Valladares, their immediate superior. They decided to take the detainees to the Motel del Puerto to hide from the cartel's gunmen while awaiting instructions. Meanwhile, the traffickers attempted to bribe the officers with huge sums of money; the officers hesitated but refused to yield to El Chapo's demands, even as he issued death threats against them and their families should they fail to release him.

Commissioner Valladares, also wary of the situation, decided to forward the photo of El Chapo to the Mexican Navy, the Mexican Army, and other authorities. Upon learning their boss was at the motel, Sinaloa Cartel gunmen resolved to rescue him at any cost; meanwhile, El Chapo continued trying to bribe Carmona, and when Carmona refused, the intimidation against him and his family intensified.

Finally, Vice Admiral Ortega received the photo and the officers' location and deployed forces to the Motel del Puerto. En route, they engaged in a fierce firefight with the cartel gunmen but managed to take them down and reach the motel.

Isaura, Carmona’s wife, and their daughters had been hiding at home after receiving threats from El Chapo’s henchmen, but they were miraculously rescued by Army troops.

As an epilogue, it is reported that Joaquín "El Chapo" Guzmán and Iván "El Cholo" Gastélum were extradited to the United States to face justice, while Carmona and Rosales left the country for security reasons.

== Cast ==
- Alfonso Herrera as Arturo Carmona
- Noé Hernández as Héctor Rosales
- Héctor Kotsifakis as el Chapo Guzmán
- Juan Pablo Cruz García as el Cholo Iván Gastelum
- Paola Fernández as Isaura Carmona
- Antonio Fortier as Barraza
- Allan Durell as Vice Admiral Ortega
- Fernando Cuautle as Lagarto
- Gerardo Trejoluna as Commander Valladares
- Isaac Bravo as Foco
- Alejandra Vázquez de León as Joana Carmona
- Regis Arroyo as Liz Carmona
- Santiago Colores as Sapo
- Daniela Torres as Bere
- Berenice Mastretta as Chabela
- Marcos Duarte as Capitán
- Ingrid Úsuga as Reina

== Production ==
The script was written by Bernardo Esquinca, who was inspired on two chronicles written by the journalist Héctor de Mauleón. The movie was filmed primarily in the state of Chihuahua, Mexico.

== Release ==
Netflix released Facing El Chapo on August 21, 2026. During its first week, the film was streamed more than 18 million times, topping Netflix's non-English Top 10.

== Reception ==
Belén Prieto of Espinof praised the suspense created by the possibility that any of the characters could betray the others. Regarding Kotsifakis's performance, she commented that the characterization of Guzmán does not seek to vindicate him, but rather to portray him as a character accustomed to being in control and forced to depend on people over whom he cannot exert authority. Srijoni Rudra of DMTalkies was positive on the development of the characters but criticized the film's visual presentation.

Carlos Boyero described for El País that the film is predictable but entertaining. André Didyme-Dôme compared the plot to Netflix's The Rip, because there is a similar police-driven plot and the main characters distrust everyone else, expecting to be betrayed. Similarly, Alejandro Alemán compared Facing El Chapo with Counterstrike, also directed by Cartas. Alemán believes that Facing El Chapo manages to overcome the flaws and criticism that Counterstrike received, which were related to the glorification of the Mexican Armed Forces through a fictional story.

== See also ==
- El Chapo (TV series)
