= The Social Reckoning =

2026 film by Aaron Sorkin

- Theatrical release poster
- Directed by: Aaron Sorkin
- Written by: Aaron Sorkin
- Produced by: Todd Black; Peter Rice; Aaron Sorkin; Tony A. Grier; Stuart M. Besser
- Starring: Mikey Madison; Jeremy Allen White; Wunmi Mosaku; Betty Gilpin; Billy Magnussen; Bill Burr; Jeremy Strong
- Cinematography: Jeff Cronenweth
- Edited by: Alan Baumgarten
- Music by: Alexandre Desplat
- Production companies: Columbia Pictures; Alcon Entertainment
- Distributed by: Sony Pictures Releasing
- Release dates: September 29, 2026 (Curzon Mayfair); October 9, 2026 (United States)
- Running time: 112 minutes
- Country: United States
- Language: English
- Budget: $30–42 million
- Box office: $18.1 million

The Social Reckoning is a 2026 American biographical legal thriller film written, co-produced, and directed by Aaron Sorkin. A follow-up to The Social Network (2010), it dramatizes the 2021 Facebook leak by the whistleblower Frances Haugen and Jeff Horwitz. It stars Mikey Madison, Jeremy Allen White, Jeremy Strong, Bill Burr, Wunmi Mosaku, Betty Gilpin, and Billy Magnussen.

In the years since its release, Sorkin had expressed interest in writing a follow-up to The Social Network should it involve its director David Fincher. The Social Reckoning entered development in June 2025 with Sorkin attached as both writer and director. Casting was also underway that month, with Strong being hired to replace Jesse Eisenberg as Mark Zuckerberg in September. Principal photography began in October 2025 in Vancouver, Canada, and wrapped that December. Sorkin and cinematographer Jeff Cronenweth were the only major cast or crew members to return from The Social Network.

The Social Reckoning was released by Sony Pictures Releasing in the United States on October 9, 2026. The film received mixed reviews from critics, who considered it inferior to its predecessor, and grossed just $18.1 million worldwide against a production budget of $30–42 million.

== Plot ==
In 2019, data engineer Frances Haugen joins the Civic Integrity team at Facebook. Although she believes in Facebook's mission to connect people, she discovers that its leadership prioritizes engagement and revenue over user safety. Facebook media relations executive Teddy Marks briefs employees on journalists' efforts to obtain internal information. Frances attempts to raise her concerns publicly, but the forum ends before she can speak while her colleagues dismiss her.

The Wall Street Journal investigative reporter Jeff Horwitz joins the paper's San Francisco Bureau and receives an assignment covering Facebook. A political reporter by trade, Jeff is skeptical of Facebook's influence on American life. He contacts Civic Integrity employees through LinkedIn and eventually connects with Frances, who agrees to meet despite fearing the consequences of violating her non-disclosure agreement. During their meeting, Frances describes her concerns and recounts how her friend Kayleigh, a political progressive, became radicalized after spending considerable time on Facebook and was eventually arrested for harassing concerned officers while drunk. Although interested in her allegations, Jeff lacks sufficient evidence to publish a story.

Frances accompanies her colleagues to present their findings to Mark Zuckerberg. The team explains that Facebook's algorithms amplify hate speech and divisive content, but Mark rejects their proposed changes and ends the presentation early. Fearing that Civic Integrity will be disbanded, Frances becomes more willing to share internal documents with Jeff, meeting him at his hotel. Following the 2020 United States presidential election, Facebook dissolves Civic Integrity. At a farewell party, Frances asks her colleague Morgan to sign an open letter she has written, but Morgan urges her to delete it. Morgan later visits Frances's apartment and gives her a flash drive containing an internal study of Facebook's effects on teen mental health.

Frances, who has coeliac disease, temporarily relocates to San Juan, Puerto Rico, as the COVID-19 pandemic begins. Jeff travels there to continue working with her and, armed with sufficient documentation, starts publishing articles in the Facebook Files series. Facebook's human resources department subsequently orders Frances back to the Bay Area, determining that she cannot work remotely from a U.S. territory. Fearing that Facebook will identify her as the source of the leaks, Frances cuts off contact with Jeff.

In 2021, Mark prepares to testify before the United States Senate with assistance from crisis management consultant Raya, former Facebook investor Charlie Garrigan, and several aides. Raya coaches him on questions concerning content moderation and Facebook's influence on American elections. Charlie challenges the company's approach to free speech and its fact-checking of political advertisements, while Mark maintains that Facebook operates as a "public square."

Their preparations are interrupted by news of the January 6 United States Capitol attack. After President Donald Trump fails to call off the protesters, advisers urge Mark to ban him from Facebook. Mark initially freezes but, under pressure from Raya and Charlie, ultimately decides to block Trump from posting on Facebook's platforms.

After meeting with Jeff and his colleagues, Frances resolves to seek whistleblower protection and testify before the Senate. As Jeff's reporting reaches Mark and his team, Jeff interviews Teddy on background before publishing another installment of the Facebook Files. Frances and Jeff meet in Washington, D.C., before her testimony. After delivering her opening statement, Frances shares a moment of recognition with Jeff.

Closing titles reveal that Facebook eliminated its fact-checking programs, the company changed its name to Meta in October 2021, and 43% of Americans continue to receive their news from Facebook.

== Cast ==
- Mikey Madison as Frances Haugen, a data engineer and product manager for Facebook and whistleblower who leaks thousands of the company's internal documents
- Jeremy Allen White as Jeff Horwitz, a Wall Street Journal reporter whose aid Frances enlists
- Jeremy Strong as Mark Zuckerberg, the billionaire CEO of Facebook
- Bill Burr as Charlie Garrigan, a former Facebook investor and member of Zuckerberg's legal counsel, loosely based on Roger McNamee
- Wunmi Mosaku as Raya, a crisis management specialist and member of Zuckerberg's legal counsel
- Billy Magnussen as Teddy Marks, a media relations executive for Facebook
- Betty Gilpin as Kris, the bureau chief of the Wall Street Journal's San Francisco office and Horwitz's boss
- Gbenga Akinnagbe as Andy, Horwitz's editor
- Anna Lambe as Morgan, one of Frances's colleagues on the Civic Integrity Team
- Aidan Laprete as Zach, an intern working with Horwitz
- Kelley Pereira as Evelyn, a college student and intern working with Horwitz
- Nelson Franklin as Tom
- Portia Doubleday as Kayleigh, a former friend of Haugen's who was radicalized by Voice of Reason, a white supremacy group on Facebook
- Patrick Fischler as Robbie
- Joey Brooks as Brendan
- Sierra Capri as Deputy Diaz
- Tehmina Sunny as Amal

== Production ==
=== Development ===
In January 2019, Aaron Sorkin, the screenwriter of The Social Network (2010), revealed that producer Scott Rudin had suggested the development of a screenplay for a sequel, noting, "A lot of very interesting, dramatic stuff has happened since the movie ends." Sorkin also mentioned that there was indeed enough material to create a sequel. On July 18, 2019, Jesse Eisenberg, who starred as Facebook co-founder and CEO Mark Zuckerberg in The Social Network, expressed his interests in starring in the proposed sequel, stating that "Sorkin is a genius, and if he chooses to write about something, I'll obviously be interested". In October 2020, a decade after the film's release, Sorkin announced that he would only write the sequel if David Fincher returned as director. By 2021, Sorkin began directing films whose scripts he had written and reiterated his interest in writing a follow-up film for The Social Network. In 2023, Fincher told The Guardian that he and Sorkin have discussed a sequel, but said "that's a can of worms." In April 2024, Sorkin said he had been working on the script for a new Facebook film tied to the January 6 United States Capitol attack.

Announced with the title The Social Network Part II, the film was reported to have entered development in June 2025, with Sorkin attached as both writer and director, with the story focusing on the 2021 Facebook leak by whistleblower Frances Haugen as reported by Jeff Horwitz in The Facebook Files for The Wall Street Journal and his 2024 book, Broken Code: Inside Facebook and the Fight to Expose Its Toxic Secrets. and Haugen's 2023 memoir The Power of One: How I Found the Strength to Tell the Truth and Why I Blew the Whistle on Facebook.

Sorkin produced alongside Todd Black and Stuart M. Besser, after collaborating on his last two films, The Trial of the Chicago 7 (2020) and Being the Ricardos (2022), as director. The title was changed to The Social Reckoning in September 2025.

=== Casting ===
Casting was underway by June 2025, with the film seen as a vehicle for many rising stars. It remained unknown if Eisenberg would reprise the role. In July 2025, it was announced that Mikey Madison, Jeremy Allen White, and Jeremy Strong were being considered for roles. In September 2025, they were confirmed for the cast, with Strong set to replace Eisenberg. It was revealed that Eisenberg declined to reprise the role of Zuckerberg, having felt, among other reasons, that he had outgrown it. Sorkin admitted to being taken by surprise by Eisenberg's rejection of the project and the substantial paycheck the studio offered him, and spent time trying to convince him to return to no avail. Later, Sorkin added that: "I felt like it belonged to him, and he was certainly battle-tested but he simply did not want to be conflated with Mark Zuckerberg anymore... he has his problems with the guy." Strong said he developed his performance independently rather than taking inspiration from Eisenberg. Madison implied dissatisfaction with the experience, saying, "in the future, I look forward to possibly having the opportunity to authentically and faithfully represent a real person."

Later in September, Bill Burr joined the cast. Additional castings including Wunmi Mosaku, Billy Magnussen, Betty Gilpin, Gbenga Akinnagbe, Tehmina Sunny and Portia Doubleday were announced throughout October.

=== Filming ===
Principal photography began in Vancouver on October 22, 2025, and wrapped on December 9, under the working title Goliath. Jeff Cronenweth was the cinematographer, returning from The Social Network. Strong and White did not spend any time together during production.

=== Music ===
In March 2026, Alexandre Desplat was confirmed to provide the musical score, replacing Trent Reznor and Atticus Ross from the previous film. This is the first film directed by Aaron Sorkin not to be scored by Daniel Pemberton.

== Release ==
The Social Reckoning had its world premiere at the Curzon Mayfair Cinema in London on September 29, 2026, and was released in the United States on October 9, by Sony Pictures Releasing through Columbia Pictures label.

== Reception ==
=== Box office ===
As of October 25, 2026, The Social Reckoning has grossed $9.1 million in the United States and Canada, and $8.9 million in other territories, for a worldwide total of $18.1 million. The film will reportedly lose Sony a few million dollars, after all ancillaries.

In the United States and Canada, the film debuted to $5 million from 2,606 theaters, finishing in fifth place. The opening was notably less than the The Social Network's $22 million in October 2010, which was attributed in-part to Hurricane Isaias making landfall in the Gulf region, as well as the decreased public interest in social media than a decade earlier. In its second weekend the film made $1.4 million (dropping 73%), finishing outside the top ten.

=== Critical response ===
On the review aggregator website Rotten Tomatoes, 54% of 272 critics' reviews are positive, with an average rating of 5.9/10. The website's consensus reads: "An urgent warning that feels like it's arriving a little too late, Aaron Sorkin's spiritual sequel to one of his crowning achievements is a worthwhile critique of social media's omnipresence that nonetheless pales in comparison to its predecessor." Metacritic, which uses a weighted average, assigned the film a score of 51 out of 100, based on 58 critics, indicating "mixed or average" reviews. Audiences polled by CinemaScore gave the film an average grade of "B–" on an A+ to F scale, down from the B+ earned by its predecessor, while those surveyed by PostTrak gave it a 75% overall positive score, with 59% saying they would definitely recommend the film.

The Hollywood Reporter's David Rooney praised the film, saying that "this nominal sequel makes for sharp entertainment, even if it sticks you with the depressing takeaway of a cautionary tale addressing a blight that's too late to fix," and singled out Sorkin's screenplay for its "signature rapid-fire, garrulous dialogue" that avoids devolving into a "pedantic lecture." Peter Bradshaw of The Guardian awarded The Social Reckoning three out of five stars, writing that it "rattles along at an entertaining clip, although there are false notes" such as the lack of reference to Donald Trump and Sorkin's distinct writing quirks "effac[ing] the difference between all the characters" with the exception of Zuckerberg, who Bradshaw noted to be "basically evil ... as if all the zinging, smart-alecky Sorkinesque dialogue energy of the first film has been siphoned away in early middle age and dispersed among the insurgents in the new cast."

Guy Lodge of Variety compared The Social Reckoning negatively with its predecessor The Social Network regarding their respective messaging and leads' performances. He said "the film's note of stopgap triumph is quaint at best, and hardly satisfying" before adding "Jesse Eisenberg brilliantly essayed Zuckerberg as a boy sociopath, all nerves exposed as he built his armor; here, as embodied by Strong, he's reached final form, emotionally constipated to an absurdist degree. There may be some truth to that; dramatically, however, he's a dead end."

Several commentators have framed Luca Guadagnino's Artificial, a dramatization of Sam Altman and the 2023 OpenAI leadership crisis, as the true successor to The Social Network, with Variety's Owen Gleiberman writing that it, rather than The Social Reckoning, is the real sequel. Inverse similarly argued that Artificial's subject matter and ripped-from-the-headlines premise made it a closer heir to the original film's cultural clout than Sorkin's sequel, which follows Zuckerberg after he has already reached the top. Reviewers of The Social Reckoning itself called it a tepid retelling of the 2021 Facebook Files reporting, with one noting that the film treats Zuckerberg's self-description as a free speech absolutist as the basis for Facebook's lack of accountability, and Sorkin has said he explores Zuckerberg's motives less than he did in the first film.
