= Lupe Anguiano =

American civil rights activist (1929–2026)

Lupe Anguiano (March 12, 1929 – June 12, 2026) was an American civil rights activist known for her work on women's rights, the rights of the poor, and the protection of the environment.

== Biography ==
Anguiano was the fourth of six children born to a Mexican-American migrant family who moved from Colorado to California between May and December to harvest fruit, vegetables and nuts. She earned a master's degree in administration and education from Antioch College.

She joined Our Lady of Victory Missionary Sisters from 1949 to 1964. She chose the order for their reputation being advocates for the poor. She left the church after joining picket lines and protesting a prospective law set out by the California Association of Realtors to reverse the 1963 Rumford Fair Housing Act, which banned racial discrimination by landlords.

Anguiano went on to work with the Department of Health, Education and Welfare in 1965. She also consulted with government agencies and testified before state and national legislative bodies. She worked with Cesar Chavez, and in Michigan where she led the grape boycott of 1965. After leaving her post in the government, she focused on the welfare system as a result of becoming “angry at the way in which the system traps young, healthy, and intelligent women; makes them dependent on welfare; destroys their pride and their willingness to work; and keeps them living always under the poverty level.” In 1973, her disillusionment led her back to San Antonio where she became national organizer for the United Farm Workers and founded the National Women’s Employment & Education Inc, which helps single female parents move beyond welfare poverty.

She was a founding member of the National Women's Political Caucus, along with Gloria Steinem and Bella Abzug, and has worked on behalf of the Equal Rights Amendment. Anguiano was a delegate to the historic "First Women's Conference" in Houston in 1977, where she, Jean Stapleton, and Coretta Scott King read the "Declaration of American Women." In 1996, Congress passed landmark welfare reform legislation that contained many of her ideas.

Anguiano later volunteered at the California Coastal Protection Network, the Pacific Environment, and other environmental organizations. Her papers are housed at the UCLA Chicano Studies Research Center.

In 2007, she was designated a Women's History Month Honoree by the National Women's History Project.

She was a resident of Oxnard, California. Anguiano died on June 12, 2026, at the age of 97.

== Awards ==
- 35th California Assembly District Woman of the Year
- President’s Volunteer Award, 1983
- Women's History Month Honoree by the National Women's History Project, 2007
