= Contenido =

Monthly general interest magazine in Mexico

Contenido is a Mexican monthly general interest magazine covering articles on the experience of people. The magazine was founded in 1963. The headquarters of the magazine, which is published by Editorial Contenido S.A. DE C.V., is in Mexico City. The magazine is similar to Reader's Digest.
