= Jeff Horwitz =

Technology journalist

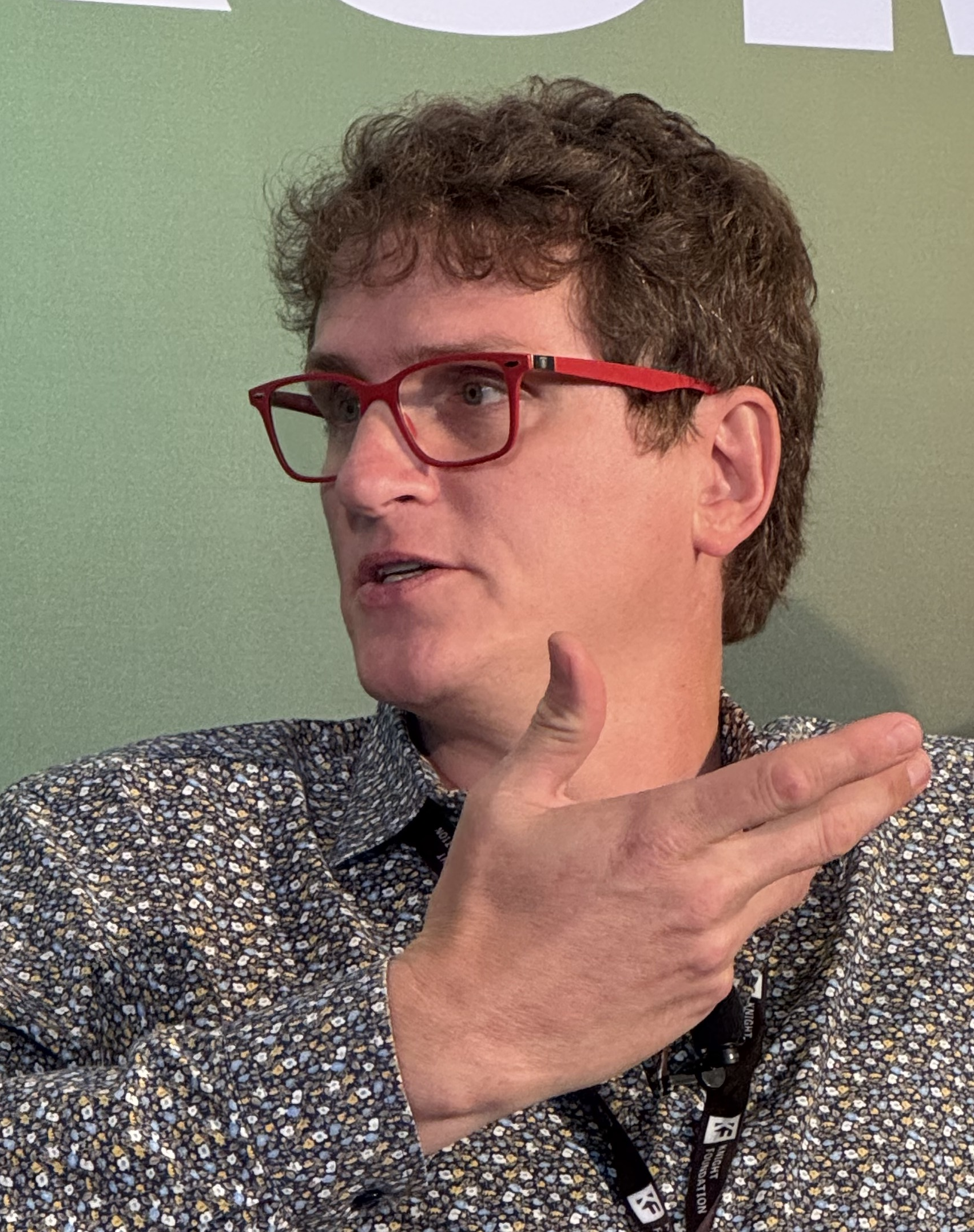
- Jeff Horwitz at Knight Media Forum 2025
- Born: Jeffrey Eric Horwitz; 1981 (age 44–45)
- Education: Pomona College (BA); Columbia University (Fellow)
- Occupation: Journalist
- Known for: The Facebook Files reports
- Notable work: Broken Code: Inside Facebook and the Fight to Expose Its Toxic Secrets

Jeff Horwitz is an investigative technology reporter for Thomson Reuters and a former reporter for The Wall Street Journal and other publications. A Pulitzer Prize recipient, he was heavily involved in breaking the 2021 Facebook leak, and wrote the book Broken Code: Inside Facebook and the Fight to Expose Its Toxic Secrets. Horwitz's book is the base of a feature film, The Social Reckoning (2026), written and directed by Aaron Sorkin; Horwitz is portrayed in the film by Jeremy Allen White.

== Early life ==
Jeffrey Eric Horwitz was born in 1981, in Alameda County, California, went to The College Preparatory School in Oakland, California and graduated in 1999. He then attended Pomona College, in Claremont, California, graduating in 2003. In 2013, he received a Knight-Bagehot fellowship at Columbia University Journalism School in New York City.

== Career ==
Horwitz was a reporter for Associated Press, American Banker, Legal Times, The San Bernardino Sun and The Washington City Paper.

In 2019, Horwitz became a reporter for the Wall Street Journal in San Francisco.

Horwitz used LinkedIn to message many Facebook employees in the hopes of hearing back from anyone. In early December 2020, on the day that Facebook dissolved its civic integrity team, Frances Haugen contacted Horwitz.

In early December 2020, Horwitz first met Frances Haugen on a hiking trail near the Chabot Space and Science Center in Oakland, California. In 2021, Horwitz published the first piece of The Facebook Files.

Horwitz became a reporter for Reuters in San Francisco.

== Personal life ==
Horwitz lives in Oakland with his wife.

== Awards ==
In 2009, Horwitz won the Overseas Press Club (OPC) Foundation Scholarship in memory of Fred Wiegold, "for the pursuit of academic goals".

In 2021, Horwitz and the Wall Street Journal staff won the George Polk Award for Business Reporting, for "Facebook Files".

In 2022, Jeff Horwitz, Georgia Wells, Deepa Seetharaman, Keach Hagey, Justin Scheck, Newley Purnell, Sam Schechner, and Emily Glazer, won the Gerald Loeb Award for Beat Reporting, for The Wall Street Journal series, The Facebook Files.

In 2024, Jeff Horwitz and Katherine Blunt, for The Dark Side of Meta's Algorithms in The Wall Street Journal won the Gerald Loeb Award for Beat Reporting, in a tie with Reuters.

In 2026, Jeff Horwitz and Engen Tham of Reuters won the 2026 Pulitzer Prize for Beat Reporting, for reporting on Meta Platforms.

Horwitz has won the Christopher J Welles Memorial Prize (Columbia Journalism School) and the New York Press Club's Gold Keyboard.

== Works ==
- Horwitz, Jeff (October 10, 2024). Broken Code: Inside Facebook and the Fight to Expose Its Toxic Secrets. Penguin Random House. ISBN 978-1-80499-577-8.
