= 2021 Facebook leak =

Internal document leak

In 2021, an internal document leak from Facebook (now Meta Platforms, or Meta) showed it was aware of harmful societal effects from its platforms, yet persisted in prioritizing profit over addressing these harms. The leak, released by whistleblower Frances Haugen, resulted in reporting from The Wall Street Journal in September, as The Facebook Files series by journalist Jeff Horwitz, as well as the Facebook Papers, by a consortium of news outlets over the following months.

Primarily, the reports revealed that, based on internally commissioned studies, the company was fully aware of negative impacts on teenage users of Instagram, and the contribution of Facebook activity to violence in developing countries. Other takeaways of the leak include the impact of the company's platforms on spreading false information, and Facebook's policy of promoting inflammatory posts. Furthermore, Facebook was fully aware that harmful content was being pushed through Facebook algorithms reaching young users. The types of content included posts promoting anorexia nervosa and self-harm photos.

In October 2021, Whistleblower Aid filed eight anonymous whistleblower complaints with the U.S. Securities and Exchange Commission (SEC) on behalf of Haugen alleging securities fraud by the company, after Haugen leaked the company documents the previous month. After publicly revealing her identity on 60 Minutes, Haugen testified before the U.S. Senate Commerce Subcommittee on Consumer Protection, Product Safety, and Data Security about the content of the leaked documents and the complaints. After the company renamed itself as Meta Platforms, Whistleblower Aid filed two additional securities fraud complaints with the SEC against the company on behalf of Haugen in February 2022.

In response to the media fallout, Facebook executives went on press tours to express Facebook's position amidst the frenzy. Facebook also did internal damage control with employees through in-person sessions and memos. The leak was dramatized in the film The Social Reckoning (2026).

== Background ==
There were conflicts of interest between what was good for the public and what was good for Facebook. And Facebook, over and over again, chose to optimize for its own interests, like making more money.

— Whistleblower Frances Haugen on 60 Minutes, October 3, 2021

In mid September 2021, The Wall Street Journal began publishing articles on Facebook based on internal documents from unknown provenance. Revelations included reporting of special allowances on posts from high-profile users ("XCheck"), subdued responses to flagged information on human traffickers and drug cartels, a shareholder lawsuit concerning the cost of Facebook (now Meta) CEO Mark Zuckerberg's personal liability protection in resolving the Cambridge Analytica data scandal, an initiative to increase pro-Facebook news within user news feeds, and internal knowledge of how Instagram exacerbated negative self-image in surveyed teenage girls.

Siva Vaidhyanathan wrote for The Guardian that the documents were from a team at Facebook "devoted to social science and data analytics that is supposed to help the company's leaders understand the consequences of their policies and technological designs." Casey Newton of The Verge wrote that it is the company's biggest challenge since its Cambridge Analytica data scandal.

The leaked documents include internal research from Facebook that studied the impact of Instagram on teenage mental health. Although Facebook claimed earlier that its rules applies equally to everyone on the platform, internal documents shared with The Wall Street Journal point to special policy exceptions reserved for VIP users, including celebrities and politicians. After this reporting, Facebook's oversight board said it would review the system.

On October 3, 2021, the former Facebook employee behind the leak, Frances Haugen, revealed her identity on a 60 Minutes interview where she detailed the harm Facebook knowingly allowed on their platform. In her interview, she explains that her friend falling subject to propaganda is what pushed her to be so vocal about the misdoings of Facebook.

== The reports ==
Beginning October 22, a group of news outlets began publishing articles based on documents provided by Haugen's lawyers, collectively referred to as The Facebook Papers. These articles detailed the various crimes Facebook was complicit in.

=== 2020 U.S. elections and January 6 U.S. Capitol attack ===
The New York Times pointed to internal discussions where employees raised concerns that Facebook was spreading content about the QAnon conspiracy theory more than a year before the 2020 United States elections. After the election, a data scientist mentioned in an internal note that 10 percent of all U.S. views of political content were of posts alleging that the election was fraudulent. Among the ten anonymous whistleblower complaints Whistleblower Aid filed with the SEC on behalf of Haugen, one complaint alleged that Facebook misled the company's investors and the general public about its role in perpetuating misinformation related to the 2020 elections and political extremism that caused the January 6 United States Capitol attack. Haugen was employed at Facebook from June 2019 until May 2021, starting within the company's Civic Integrity Team that was focused on investigating and addressing worldwide elections issues on the platform, as well as how the platform could be used to spread political disinformation and misinformation, to incite violence, and be abused by malicious governments until the company dissolved the team in December 2020.

In the weeks after the 2020 U.S. presidential election, Facebook began rolling back many content policy enforcement measures it had in place during the election despite internal company tracking data showing a rise in policy-violating content on the platform, while Donald Trump's Facebook account had been whitelisted in the company's XCheck program. Another of the whistleblower complaints Haugen filed with the SEC alleged that the company misled investors and the general public about enforcement of its terms of service due to such whitelisting under the XCheck program. Haugen was interviewed by videoconference by the January 6th Committee in November 2021 about her tenure at Facebook, the company documents she provided to Congress, the company's corporate structure, and her testimony before Congress the previous month, but none of the information she provided to the Committee was included in its final report.

=== Instagram's effects on teenagers ===
The Files show that Facebook (now Meta) had been conducting internal research of how Instagram affects young users since 2018. While the findings point to Instagram being harmful to a large portion of young users, teenage girls were among the most harmed. Researchers within the company reported that "we make body issues worse for one in three teenage girls". Furthermore, internal research revealed that teen boys were also affected by negative social comparison, citing 14% of boys in the U.S. in 2019. Instagram was concluded to contribute to problems more specific to its app use, such as social comparison among teens. Facebook published some of its internal research on September 29, 2021, saying these reports mischaracterized the purpose and results of its research.

=== Studying of preteens ===
The Files show that Facebook formed a team to study preteens, set a three-year goal to create more products for this demographic, and commissioned strategy papers about the long-term business prospects of attracting the preteen demographic. Some research Facebook has done includes studies on tween usage of social media apps and parent responses. Federal privacy laws, including the Children's Online Privacy Protection Act (COPPA), restrict data collection on children under 13 years old. Internal documents from April 2021 showed plans to make apps targeting children from ages six to 17, by September, the head of Instagram announced the halting of development of those apps. A 2020 document from Facebook states: "Why do we care about tweens?" and answers that question by saying that "They are a valuable but untapped audience."

=== Violence in developing countries ===
An internal memo seen by The Washington Post revealed that Facebook has been aware of hate speech and calls for violence against groups like Muslims and Kashmiris in 2019, including posts of photos of piles of dead Kashmiri bodies with glorifying captions on its platform in India. Still, none of their publishers were blocked. Documents reveal Facebook has responded to these incidents by removing posts which violate their policy, but has not made any substantial efforts to prevent repeat offenses. As 90% of monthly Facebook users are now located outside of the U.S. and Canada, Facebook claimed language barriers were one obstacle that is preventing widespread reform (around 2019-2021).

=== Promoting anger-provoking posts ===
In 2015, in addition to the Like button on posts, Facebook introduced a set of other emotional reaction options: love, haha, yay, wow, sad and angry. The Washington Post reported that for three years, Facebook's algorithms promoted posts receiving the new reactions (including the "angry" reaction) from its users; giving them a score five times that of traditional likes. Years later, Facebook's researchers pointed out that posts with "angry" reactions were much more likely to be toxic, polarizing, fake or low quality. Ignoring frequent internal calls, the company did not differentiate the "angry" reaction from other reactions until September 2019, when its value was cut to zero (only after realizing users' dissatisfaction over their posts receiving angry reactions). There have been other cases when Facebook prioritized new features it wanted to promote, despite this turning out to be promoting toxic or radicalizing material.

In 2018, Facebook overhauled its News Feed algorithm, implementing a new algorithm which favored "Meaningful Social Interactions" or "MSI". The new algorithm increased the weight of reshared material—a move which aimed to "reverse the decline in comments and encourage more original posting". While the algorithm was successful in its efforts, consequences such as user reports of feed quality decreasing along with increased anger on the site were observed. Leaked documents reveal that employees presented several potential changes to fix some of the highlighted issues with their algorithm. However, documents claim Mark Zuckerberg denied the proposed changes due to his worry that they might cause fewer users to engage with Facebook. Documents have also pointed to another 2019 study conducted by Facebook where a fake account based in India was created and studied to see what type of content it was presented and interacted with. Results of the study showed that within three weeks, the fake account's newsfeed was being presented pornography and "filled with polarizing and graphic content, hate speech and misinformation", according to an internal company report.

=== Employee dissatisfaction ===
Politico quotes several Facebook staff expressing concerns about the company's willingness and ability to respond to damage caused by the platform. A 2020 post reads: "It's not normal for a large number of people in the 'make the site safe' team to leave saying, 'hey, we're actively making the world worse FYI.' Every time this gets raised it gets shrugged off with 'hey people change jobs all the time' but this is NOT normal." Another post from 2019 reads: "We do have reasonable metrics that can tell us when a given ranking change is likely to be causing integrity harms—even with low precision and recall, we can get a decent sense of whether a launch is increasing hate speech, or misinformation, or other harms. However, we don't have a way of effectively demoting this content in a targeted way... and even if we did, we often won't be able to launch them based on policy concerns."

=== Apple's threat to remove Facebook and Instagram ===
In 2019, following concerns about Facebook and Instagram being used to trade maids in the Middle East, Apple threatened to remove their iOS apps from the App Store. Facebook, then, promised to enforce stronger regulations, yet later stated that it was under-enforcing them. Two years later, a search on Facebook for maids would still yield results of workers. These maids have reported being starved, sold, locked in their homes, and physically assaulted.

=== XCheck ===
The documents have shown a private program known as "XCheck" or "cross-check" that Facebook has employed in order to whitelist posts from users deemed as "high-profile". The system began as a quality control measure but has since grown to protect "millions of VIP users from the company's normal enforcement process". XCheck has led to celebrities and other public figures being exempt from punishment that the average Facebook user would receive from violating policies. In 2019, football player Neymar had posted nude photos of a woman who had accused him of rape which were left up for more than a day. According to The Wall Street Journal, "XCheck grew to include at least 5.8 million users in 2020" according to Facebook's internal documents. The goal of XCheck was "to never publicly tangle with anyone who is influential enough to do you harm".

=== Collaboration on censorship with the government of Vietnam ===
In 2020, Vietnam's communist government threatened to shut down Facebook if the social media company did not cooperate on censoring political content in the country, Facebook's (now Meta's) biggest market in Southeast Asia. The decision to comply was personally approved by Mark Zuckerberg. By the end of 2020, it was reported by Facebook that they had increased censorship by 983% in comparison to the last report.

=== Suppression of political movements on its platform ===
In 2021, Facebook developed a new strategy for addressing harmful content on their site, implementing measures which were designed to reduce and suppress the spread of movements that were deemed hateful. According to a senior security official at Facebook, the company "would seek to disrupt on-platform movements only if there was compelling evidence that they were the product of tightly knit circles of users connected to real-world violence or other harm and committed to violating Facebook's rules". As part of their recently coordinated initiative, this included less promotion of the movement's posts within users' News Feed as well as not notifying users of new posts from these pages. Specific groups that have been highlighted as being affected by Facebook's social harm policy include the Patriot Party, previously linked to the Capitol attack, as well as a newer German conspiracy group known as Querdenken, who had been placed under surveillance by German intelligence after protests it organized repeatedly "resulted in violence and injuries to the police".

=== Facebook's AI usage concern ===
According to The Wall Street Journal, documents show that in 2019, Facebook reduced the time spent by human reviewers on hate-speech complaints, shifting towards a stronger dependence on their artificial intelligence systems to regulate the matter. However, internal documents from employees claim that their AI has been largely unsuccessful, with trouble detecting videos of cars crashing and cockfighting, as well as understanding hate speech in foreign languages. Internal engineers and researchers within Facebook have estimated that their AI has only been able to detect and remove 0.6% of "all content that violated Facebook's policies against violence and incitement".

=== Inclusion of Breitbart News as trusted news source ===
The Wall Street Journal reported that Facebook executives resisted removing the far-right website Breitbart News from Facebook's News Tab feature to avoid angering Donald Trump and Republican members of Congress, despite criticism from Facebook employees. An August 2019 internal Facebook study had found that Breitbart News was the least trusted news source, and also ranked as low-quality, in the sources it looked at across the U.S. and Great Britain.

== The Wall Street Journal podcast ==
For The Facebook Files series of reports, The Wall Street Journal produced a podcast on its The Journal channel, divided into eight episodes:

- Part 1: "The Whitelist"
- Part 2: "We Make Body Image Issues Worse"
- Part 3: "This Shouldn't Happen on Facebook"
- Part 4: "The Outrage Algorithm"
- Part 5: "The Push to Attract Younger Users"
- Part 6: "The Whistleblower"
- Part 7: "The AI Challenge"
- Part 8: "A New Enforcement Strategy"

== Facebook's response ==
In the Q3 2021 earnings call, Facebook CEO Mark Zuckerberg discussed the recent leaks, characterizing them as coordinated efforts to paint a false picture of his company by selectively leaking documents.

According to a leaked internal email seen by The New York Times, Facebook asked its employees to "preserve internal documents and communications since 2016", a practice called a legal hold. The email continues: "As is often the case following this kind of reporting, a number of inquiries from governments and legislative bodies have been launched into the company's operations."

=== Lobbying ===
In December 2021, news broke on The Wall Street Journal pointing to Meta's lobbying efforts to divide U.S. lawmakers and "muddy the waters" in Congress, to hinder regulation following the 2021 whistleblower leaks. Facebook's lobbyist team in Washington suggested to Republican lawmakers that the whistleblower "was trying to help Democrats," while the narrative told to Democratic staffers was that Republicans "were focused on the company's decision to ban expressions of support for Kyle Rittenhouse," The Wall Street Journal reported. According to the article, the company's goal was to "muddy the waters, divide lawmakers along partisan lines and forestall a cross-party alliance" against Facebook (now Meta) in Congress.

=== Official statements ===
In October 2021, Nick Clegg went on a press tour to communicate Facebook's position in the wake of Haugen testifying and exposing Facebook's harmful practices. Nick Clegg was a Facebook executive up until 2025 and had previously served as the British Deputy Prime Minister. When asked if Facebook contributed to the January 6th attacks by allowing political propaganda and lies on their platform, Clegg responded, "Given that we have thousands of algorithms and millions of people using it, I can't give you a yes or no answer to individual personalized feeds each person uses." Clegg also claimed that Facebook allows users to override their algorithm to take more control.

=== Employee reactions ===
Facebook sent company executives on a few press tours to fix some of the damage caused by the media and the public's reaction to the Facebook Papers. Facebook also held a few internal press tours for damage control amongst employees and to gauge their reactions. This involved vice presidents holding meetings with employees on specific topics, such as polarization and the company's feelings towards it, as well as how executives were keeping the platform safe. Facebook also sent out memos as guidelines for how employees should be publicly reacting to this event. The memos they sent out also included a statement about how Facebook does not prioritize profit over safety.

Facebook employees felt split in the wake of Haugen's testimony. Some questioned Haugen's expertise, claiming that "She didn't know how basic stacks worked", while others agreed with Haugen's call to action by supporting her by saying she was "saying things that many people here have been saying for years." An overall theme amongst the majority of Facebook employees was anger, "We're FB, not some naive startup. With the unprecedented resources we have, we should do better." It was clear to many employees that this event was long coming. In 2020, a Facebook employee wrote in their sign-off post that, "we were willing to act only after things had spiraled into a dire state."

=== Changes made ===
In the wake of the fallout of Haugen's testimony, Facebook decided to make some changes. The first and biggest public move was changing their name from Facebook to Meta. They also unveiled a new logo, moving away from the iconic blue Facebook logo to an infinity symbol. This was announced in a video by Mark Zuckerberg. He went on to explain Meta's commitment to the future and a few projects they are working on.

Facebook also went on to halt production on its Instagram For Kids feature after backlash surrounding its platform's impact on children. Adam Mosseri, the head of Instagram, put out a statement explaining that this feature is still something they are committed to expanding, but in the moment, they want to consult with more experts before taking the project to beta testing. Mosseri maintained that there needs to be a platform available for children. While Facebook continues to figure out how to resume work on Instagram For Kids, they announced they will expand parental supervision.

== In popular media ==
The book Broken Code: Inside Facebook and the Fight to Expose Its Harmful Secrets was published in November 2023 by The Wall Street Journal technology reporter Jeff Horwitz.

Horwitz's book is the base of an feature film The Social Reckoning, written and directed by Aaron Sorkin. With Jeremy Strong starring as Zuckerberg, Mikey Madison as Haugen, and Jeremy Allen White as Horwitz, the film was released in 2026.

== See also ==
- Criticism of Facebook
- Comparison of user features of messaging platforms
- Instagram's impact on people
- Problematic social media use
- Twitter Files
