= Erica Baker =

Engineer and engineering manager (born 1980)

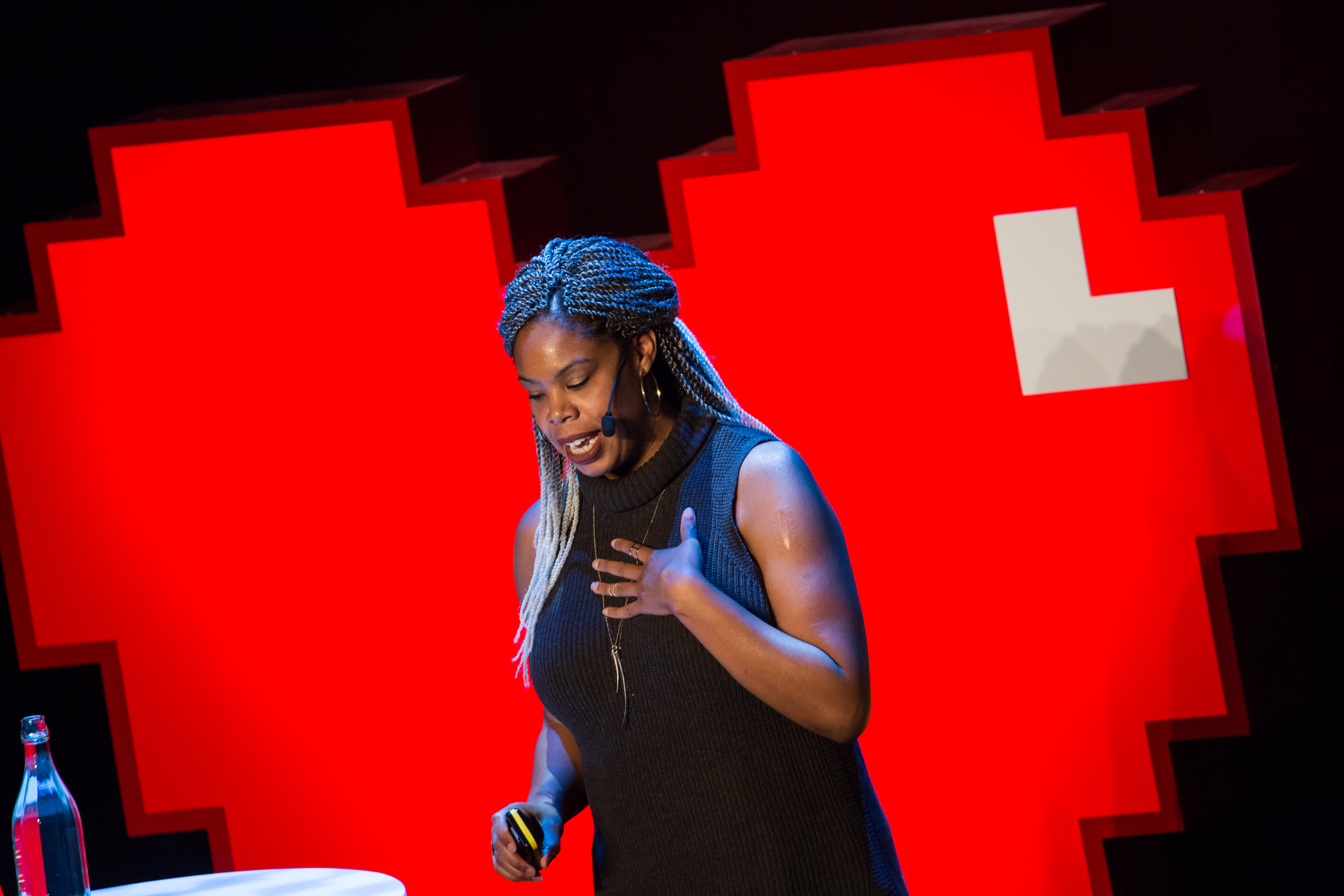
- Baker and Internetdagama 2016
- Born: 1980 (age 45–46); Germany
- Education: University of Alaska
- Occupation: Software engineer
- Spouse: B Astrella

Erica Joy Baker (born 1980) is an engineer in the San Francisco Bay Area, Chief Technology Officer for the Democratic Congressional Campaign Committee, and known for her outspoken support of diversity and inclusion. She has worked at companies including GitHub, Google, Slack, Patreon, and Microsoft. She gained prominence in 2015 for starting an internal spreadsheet where Google employees reported their salary data to better understand pay disparities within the company. Kara Swisher of Recode called Baker the "woman to watch" in a profile in C Magazine.

== Education ==
In High School, Baker took a calculator programming class, learning how to program in BASIC on Texas Instruments brand graphing calculators. She also learned how to code websites, hosting her own on GeoCities.

Baker attended the University of Miami and majored in Computer Science. She says she was one of the only two Black people in one of her core classes, and decided to transfer to the University of Alaska earning an Associate of Applied Science degree in Information Technology.

== Career ==
Baker's first job was as a Windows Domain Administrator for the University of Alaska Statewide Systems at the age of 21 years. She then moved to Home Depot for a year, doing network operations and mobile desktop support. After this, she switched to Scientific Games to do desktop support.

=== Google ===
Baker worked at Google from 2006 to May 2015, in various roles, ending with the role of Site Reliability Engineer (SRE). In July 2015, after leaving Google for Slack, Baker revealed in a series of tweets that she had started an internal spreadsheet at Google for employees to disclose their salary information. Based on the spreadsheet, a number of her colleagues were able to negotiate pay raises. Baker reported that a number of her colleagues sent her peer bonuses for starting the spreadsheet, but her peer bonuses were denied by management. The spreadsheet sparked discussion on Google's pay disparities, non-transparency in pay determination, and potential gender and ethnicity differentials in pay. The spreadsheet continued to be updated until 2017, when updated data from the spreadsheet was reported in The New York Times.

=== Post-Google ===
From May 2015 to July 2017, Baker worked as a build and release engineer at Slack. In February 2016, Baker, Megan Anctil, Kiné Camara, and Duretti Hirpa accepted TechCrunch's Crunchies award on behalf of Slack for Fastest Rising Startup. In June 2017, TechCrunch, and USA Today reported that Baker was leaving Slack to join Kickstarter as director of engineering, reporting to Lara Hogan, the newly appointed VP of Engineering, and working in Brooklyn. Although her role did not officially involve diversity and inclusion, Baker said that fostering diversity and inclusion would be part of her job. However, she ultimately stayed in the San Francisco Bay Area and became Senior Engineering Manager at Patreon. In January 2019, Baker joined Microsoft as Principal Group Engineering Manager.

In March 2021, Baker joined DCCC as Chief Technology Officer.

=== Work on diversity and inclusion ===
After creating the spreadsheet on Google's salary data and then leaving Google, Baker has been an advocate for diversity and inclusion. She was behind #RealDiversityNumbers, a Twitter movement to acquire numbers for various companies around retention and number of lawsuits settled out of court. Baker was critical of Salesforce.com CEO Marc Benioff's remarks that suggested that inclusion efforts for ethnic and racial minorities were taking a backseat so that the company could focus on gender issues.

She shed light on the performative nature of technology activism when she denounced Benioff's tweet during the Black Lives Matter protests, where a black man who was wearing a Twitter logo was being arrested. His tweet said, "Yes that is a @Twitter @blackbirds logo. Amazing to see tech as a vehicle for social change. Respect.", to which she replied, "That anyone could see a picture of a black man being arrested for protesting against the wrongful killing of another black man and respond, 'Hey look at the Twitter logo', would be mind-boggling if it happened anywhere else. In the tech industry though, it's par for the course."

She also denounced a video series by Elissa Shevinsky, the author of Lean Out, stating that it only addressed the diversity problem superficially. Meredith L. Patterson took issue with Baker's comment and accused her of having a conflict of interest. Baker, along with Tracy Chou, Freada Kapor Klein and Ellen Pao, was one of the founding members of Project Include, a startup launched in 2016 to provide diversity and inclusion strategies to client companies.

=== Public appearances ===
Baker was interviewed by WIRED's Davey Alba at WIRED Business Conference 2016. In January 2017, Baker was a keynote speaker at the Women of Color in Computing conference held by Mills College. In March 2018, Baker was a featured speaker at the Bond Conference. Baker was also a featured speaker for a Berkeley Center for New Media panel and The Wall Street Journal's Women in the Workplace Forum both in October 2018. She appeared on Jeopardy as a guest presenter in February 2021. Baker also spoke on TED, on the anxieties that are experienced when one does not feel included in the workforce.

=== Philanthropy ===
Baker is on the board of directors for Girl Develop It. She is also on the advisory board of Hack the Hood and is a tech mentor for Black Girls Code.

=== Awards ===
Baker was on the list of the BBC's 100 Women announced on 23 November 2020. She also won the 2015 Level Playing Field Institute Lux Award.

== Personal life ==
Baker spent her childhood on the move, first in Germany, where Baker was born while her parents were deployed there, then New Mexico, Florida, and Alaska. Both her parents were in the US Air Force. Baker started writing code and making websites as a teenager. During her adult life she lived in a lot of different places. Those places were Germany, New Mexico, Miami, Alaska, South Carolina, Atlanta, New York, and California.

Baker got married while in college in Alaska, but said it didn't work out.

Baker has mentioned that she has an interest in genealogy, and has spent more than ten years researching her family's history. Her hope is to someday help fill in the gaps for every other African American family as well.
