= Ban Bossy =

Public awareness campaign

- Founded: 2014
- Type: Educational charity
- Purpose: Awareness and elimination of derogatory vocabulary among youth toward women
- Location: Palo Alto, California, U.S.
- Origins: Sheryl Sandberg
- Region served: United States
- Product: Public service announcements and campaigns
- Method: Online, radio, television, and print campaigns, Field organizing, Entertainment community
- Website: banbossy.com

Ban Bossy is a self-censorship campaign launched in 2014 by LeanIn.org. The campaign criticizes the use of the word "bossy" to describe assertive girls and women, proposing that the word is stigmatizing and may discourage girls and women from seeking positions of leadership.

== Promotion ==
Sponsored primarily by the then chief operations officer of Meta Platforms and World Economic Forum member Sheryl Sandberg, and operated by Ms. Sandberg's NGO LeanIn.org and the Girl Scouts, the campaign features prominent women and various sponsors urging people to pledge not to use the word.

Featured advocates who appear in Ban Bossy promotional material in addition to Sandberg include Jennifer Garner, Jane Lynch, Diane von Fürstenberg, Condoleezza Rice, Jimmie Johnson, Sinéad O'Connor, Arne Duncan, Anna Maria Chávez, Victoria Beckham, and Beyoncé, who stated "leadership is more important to boys than girls."

The campaign website also features training material designed for schools, teachers, parents and children to further the project.

== Criticism ==
The campaign has received criticism since its launch. Joan Rivers commented that she found the online movement to be "so stupid" and added, "I find it outrageous and I find it petty ... and I find we're so damn uptight in this country that this whole country is being divided."

In The New Yorker, Margaret Talbot criticized the campaign itself as bossy and instead suggested reclaiming the word, much as has been done for "nerd" and "queer".
