= Lean In =

2013 book by Sheryl Sandberg

- Author: Sheryl Sandberg
- Published: 2013
- Publisher: Alfred A. Knopf
- Pages: 247 pp.
- ISBN: 978-0-385-34994-9
- OCLC: 813526963
- LC Class: HD6054.3 .S265 2013

Lean In: Women, Work, and the Will to Lead is a 2013 book encouraging women to assert themselves at work and at home, co-written by business executive Sheryl Sandberg and media writer Nell Scovell. Five years after its release, the book had sold 4.2 million copies.

== Synopsis, by chapter ==
The synopsis of the eleven chapters of the book is:

1. The Leadership Ambition Gap: What Would You Do If You Weren't Afraid? – Anecdotes are given in which Judith Rodin questions why highly talented women choose to leave careers and become homemakers and Gayle Tzemach Lemmon gives her opinion that a double standard makes ambition be perceived as a negative quality in a woman when it would be positive in a man.
2. Sit at the Table – Anecdotes are given about Peggy McIntosh stating that women are pressured not to accept compliments about their accomplishments, Padmasree Warrior stating that people should consider taking opportunities even if they do not feel qualified to execute them, and Ginni Rometty discussing how she took risks even staking personal failure. Also discussed is the theory that females more frequently than males display impostor syndrome concerns, and the concept of "fake it till you make it".
3. Success and Likeability – A social experiment is summarized in which two résumés stating business success are presented to various people. The resumes are identical except that one names a female job candidate and the other a male candidate. In most cases, people found the success of the male candidate to be appealing and the success of the female candidate to be worrisome. Anecdotes are given in which Mary Sue Coleman states that in negotiation women in business are often "relentlessly pleasant" and Arianna Huffington acknowledged that she had to accept a lot of criticism.
4. It's a Jungle Gym, Not a Ladder – A discussion reconsiders the concept of the "corporate ladder" suggesting that the climb to success is more like a jungle gym with multiple paths to the top. Anecdotes are given about Eric Schmidt's advice to take jobs in growing fields with advancement opportunities, even if they are less prestigious than more established positions, and how Lawrence Summers seemed to be critical with the author, then gave her more respect when she asserted herself.
5. Are You My Mentor? – The advice is given that working professionals need a mentor but that the relationship between teacher and student cannot be forced. An anecdote is given about Clara Shih regularly asking questions in business that showed respect for her mentors' time.
6. Seek and Speak Your Truth – As executive staff at Facebook, the author says that she along with others tried to make Facebook a non-hierarchical organization where everyone is free to speak their thoughts and criticism. Anecdotes are given in which Robert Rubin seeks advice from people who have fresh perspectives rather than deep experience in an existing culture and how Howard Schultz was open about sharing emotions.
7. Don't Leave before you Leave – The author states that she has seen women forgo career advancement for family, but that she feels that some women do this too far in advance of developing family life. Anecdotes are given about Peggy Orenstein finding that even young girls imagine giving up career options to favor family life. The author then states that as a hiring and promoting manager, she often asks women of a certain age whether they plan to have children. She further states that she does not transgress discrimination laws against women who will need time off from work to have children, but rather wants the employees to be comfortable taking positions even when they are about to have a child.
8. Make your Partner a real Partner – The author explores the concept of a "designated parent", which is supposed to be the person who does most of the childcare and is usually the woman. She reviews data that state that of the 28 women who direct Fortune 500 companies, only one had never married. Betty Friedan's The Feminine Mystique is cited as a source of information on the women's movement. Sandberg discusses her own marriage, which she and Dave Goldberg have set up in the Shared Earning/Shared Parenting style.
9. The Myth of Doing it All – An anecdote is given in which Tina Fey says that the rudest question which people regularly ask women is "How do you do it all?", because the assumption is that a woman who is achieving in business must not have time to spend with family, and this same question is not asked to men in business. An anecdote about Laurie Glimcher describes how she recognizes that she cannot do all work and is frank about her limits.
10. Let's Start Talking about it – The author recounts a bitter story of when, as a congressional page, she was patted condescendingly on the head by Tip O'Neill, who asked if she was a pom-pom girl, meaning a cheerleader for male work. Kenneth Chenault is given as an example of a CEO who attempts to defend women from sexism in the workplace.
11. Working Together Toward Equality – The author recalls the media attention that Marissa Mayer received for accepting a job as CEO of Yahoo while in her third trimester of pregnancy, and said that women get extra scrutiny in the workplace. She states that stay-at-home mothers frequently look down upon women with advanced careers, and that it is necessary that there not be tension between these groups.

== Reviews and criticism ==
Lean In has been reviewed by various commentators. In a July 2013 article for The Baffler, Susan Faludi argues that Sandberg's message of women's workplace empowerment is actually a corporate-backed campaign; Sandberg encourages women to market themselves as "consumer object[s]" for professional advancement while discouraging solidarity and downplaying effects of systemic gender bias in the workplace. Faludi further questions the selection criteria used by LeanIn.org for its corporate "Platform Partners", many of whom are burdened by "recent or pending EEOC grievances and state and federal court actions involving sex discrimination, sexual harassment, pregnancy discrimination, unfair promotion policies, wrongful terminations, and gender-based retaliations against female employees."

Zoe Williams in The Guardian referred to Lean In as "an infantilising, reactionary guide for ambitious women." She emphasizes Sandberg's contradictory approach in both criticizing and upholding misogynistic workplace practices.

During her Becoming book tour in 2018, Michelle Obama mentioned Lean In: "I tell women that whole 'so you can have it all.' Nope, not at the same time. That's a lie. And it's not always enough to lean in, because that shit doesn't work all the time."

=== Intersectionality: race, class, and sexual identity ===
Author bell hooks wrote a critical analysis of the book, called "Dig Deep: Beyond Lean In". hooks calls Sandberg's position "faux feminist" and describes her stance on gender equality in the workplace as agreeable to those who wield power in society—wealthy white men, according to hooks—in a seemingly feminist package. hooks writes, "[Sandberg] comes across as a lovable younger sister who just wants to play on the big brother's team." hooks states that mass media, along with Sandberg, tells us that any woman willing to work hard can climb the corporate ladder all the way to the top. The article further argues that Lean In ignores "the concrete systemic obstacles most women face inside the workforce." hooks reasons that instead of the "Lean In" campaign inciting social change, its purpose is to provide women advice on how to become successful within existing conditions, and that effectively, Lean In does not consider the reality of intersectionality, which has been a growing subject in the contemporary feminist movement.

The main elements in hooks' article, such as race, class, and sexuality, draw from her work Feminism Is For Everybody. In the book, hooks describes how not all women are made equally – there is not a homogenous identity for women. hooks states that privileged white women know that their status is different from that of black women/women of color (pg.10); reformist white women with class privilege want the freedom they see men of their class enjoying (pg.38); and heterosexual women appeal more to men and society (pg.97).

Kathleen Geier discussed in the article "Does Feminism Have a Class Problem?" that Sandberg's philosophy was that if more women advanced into leadership positions then all women would gain. Geier's response to this assumption was: "there is little reason to have faith that Sandberg-style 'trickle-down' feminism will benefit the masses any more than its economic equivalent has … her enthusiasm for capitalism and her advocacy of a depoliticized strategy that focused on self-improvement rather than collective action troubled many feminists on the left." Geier advises that the only effective and lasting way to advance economic equality is through collective political action; implementing some programs such as universal childcare, paid family and sick leave, and a European-style cap on work hours would resonate for women of all classes.

In the same The Nation article, Judith Warner, a senior fellow at the Center for American Progress and author, parallels Geier by saying that feminism should focus on structural problems and not individual adaptation. Women need to find experiences that unite them without forgetting the differences of class, race, education, and empowerment that set them apart. Warner also advocates that one of the most effective actions toward gender equality is fighting for meaningful workplace flexibility.

The third contributor to The Nation article is Heather McGhee, president of Demos. She explains that a business model that relies on suppressed wages on those who are at the bottom of their society's social and political hierarchies – women as well as that of immigrants, people of color, and the poor – will not be feminist when a woman breaks through as a CEO. McGhee mentions some statistics gathered by Demos, which shows that retail's gender pay gap costs women an estimated $40.8 billion in lost wages annually, a total that will rise to $381 billion cumulatively by 2022. McGhee advocates that bridging the pay gap should be a focus for women.

Along with Kathleen Geier, Judith Warner, and Heather McGhee, Nancy Folbre, an economics professor at the University of Massachusetts Amherst, discussed in the article about Lean In with relation to intersectionality. Folbre illustrated intersectionality as the following, "it's more-than-four-way intersection, there's no traffic light and people often don't know which way to turn. Some, driving luxury SUVs, will be perfectly safe. Others, on foot, are likely to get hurt. Gender is an important vehicle of collective identity. So too are class, race, ethnicity and citizenship." Folbre continues to say that Lean In vindicates intersectional analysis as the focus of inequality in the book was only based on gender. Moreover, the book speaks to a selected few of women who are seeking to advance their careers, not those who are struggling to find and keep a stable job.

Susan Faludi argues that challengers of Lean In cannot argue against Sandberg without mentioning her wealth. Faludi expresses that a problem with the "Lean In" venture is that it leaves out single mothers: "Lean In offers a faux liberation for single mothers, as they couldn't 'lean in' if they wanted." Furthermore, Faludi reasons that improving the lives of single mothers requires more than showing women of privilege how they can further advance themselves in society. This standpoint correlates to contemporary feminists who argue for social and cultural change to support "mothering" (including single mothers) as an empowering rather than oppressive experience.

In 2015, OR Books published Lean Out: The Struggle for Gender Equality in Tech and Start-up Culture, edited by Elissa Shevinsky, which included a number of essays that make the above points and recount a variety of experiences of just how big the barriers for women in tech really are.

In 2019, author Minda Harts released her first book, The Memo: What Women of Color Need to Know to Secure a Seat at the Table. The book was compared to Lean In, but tailored to the specific needs and experiences of women of color. It provided an in-depth look at the racism and sexism women of color face in the workplace and offers strategies to help them achieve their career goals.

== LeanIn.org ==
In response to the success of the book, Sandberg founded LeanIn.org (also known as Lean In Foundation) in the same year the book was published, a nonprofit 501(c)(3) organization, dedicated "to offering women the ongoing inspiration and support to help them achieve their goals." The organization offers educational resources and programming that encourages female leadership.

== See also ==
- Careless People
