= Sylvia Acevedo =

American businesswoman and engineer

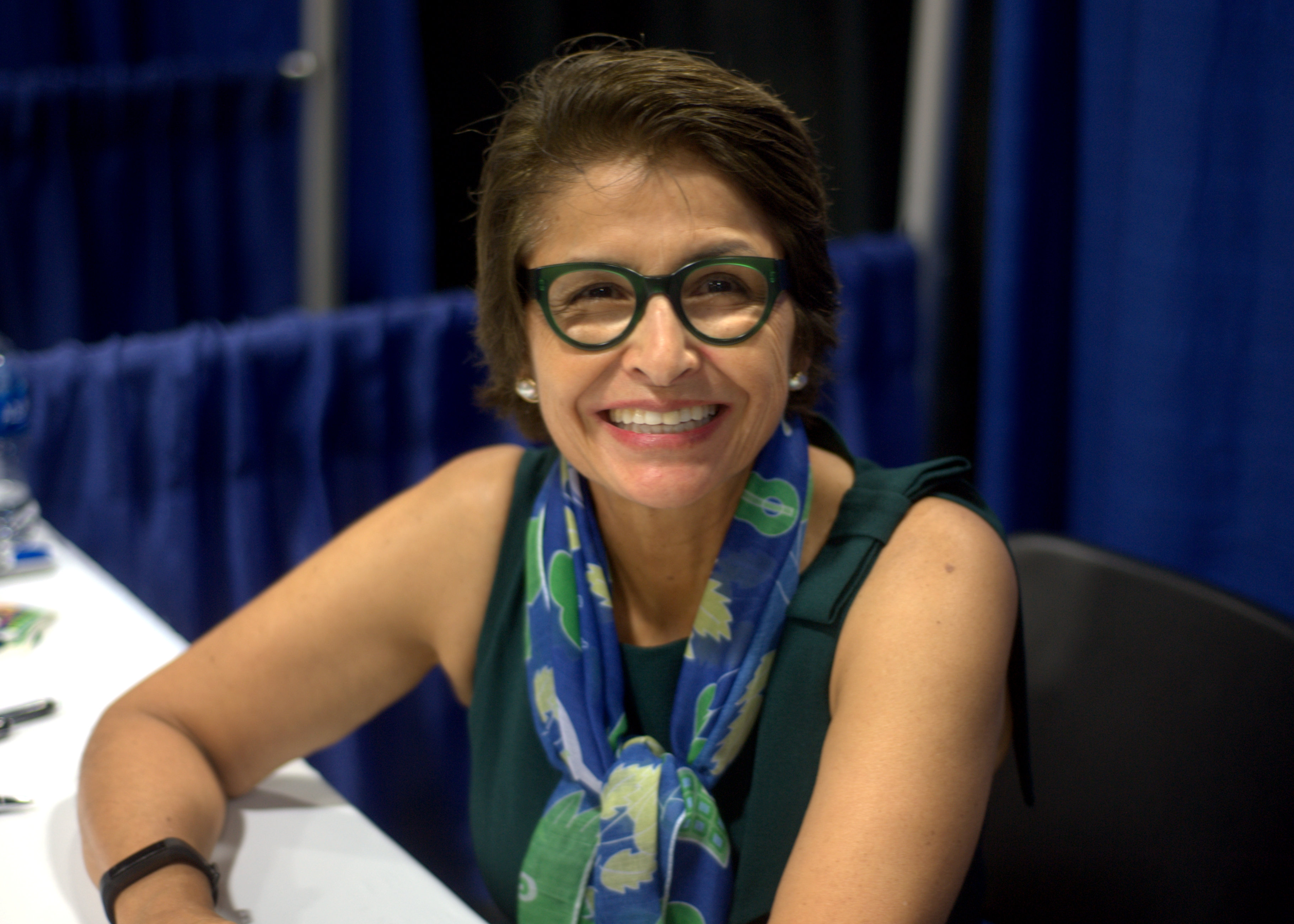
- at the 2018 National Book Festival
- Born: Sylvia Elia Acevedo; 1963 or 1964 (age 62–63); South Dakota, U.S.
- Education: New Mexico State University (B.S.); Stanford University (M.S.)
- Title: Former CEO, Girl Scouts of the USA
- Predecessor: Anna Maria Chávez
- Successor: Judith Batty (interim)
- Website: sylviaacevedo.org

Sylvia Elia Acevedo is a business executive, author and corporate director. She served as chief executive officer (CEO) of the Girl Scouts of the USA from 2016 to 2020. Earlier in her career, she worked as an engineer at NASA's Jet Propulsion Laboratory, where she was on the Voyager 2 team. She has held executive roles at Apple, Dell, and Autodesk.

In 2018, Acevedo was included in a Forbes list of "America's Top 50 Women In Tech". She was a founder, with three others of REBA Technology, an infiniband company that was sold and also the Founder and CEO of CommuniCard. She serves on the boards of Qualcomm and Credo Technology Group, where she is Lead Independent Director and serves as an independent advisor for several early stage technology and AI companies.

== Early life and education ==
Acevedo was born near Ellsworth Air Force Base in South Dakota where her father was serving as an officer in the military. Her family moved to Las Cruces, New Mexico. She joined the Girl Scouts at age seven. She was active in the local Brownie troop, where she was encouraged to pursue her scientific interests in school. Acevedo collected newspaper articles about the space program and built Estes model rockets from paper-and-plastic kits. She used her troop leaders' advice of breaking down hard tasks into small goals to forge her path to Stanford University.

In 1979 she earned a B.S. in industrial engineering from New Mexico State University. The National GEM Consortium awarded Acevedo with the GEM Fellowship to fund her graduate school studies at Stanford University. She was one of the first Hispanic students at Stanford University to earn a M.S. in systems engineering. She has often spoken about how being bilingual shaped her worldview and influenced her leadership style. In her memoir, Path to the Stars, Acevedo revealed that it was stargazing on her first Brownies Girl Scout trip that ignited her interest in science.

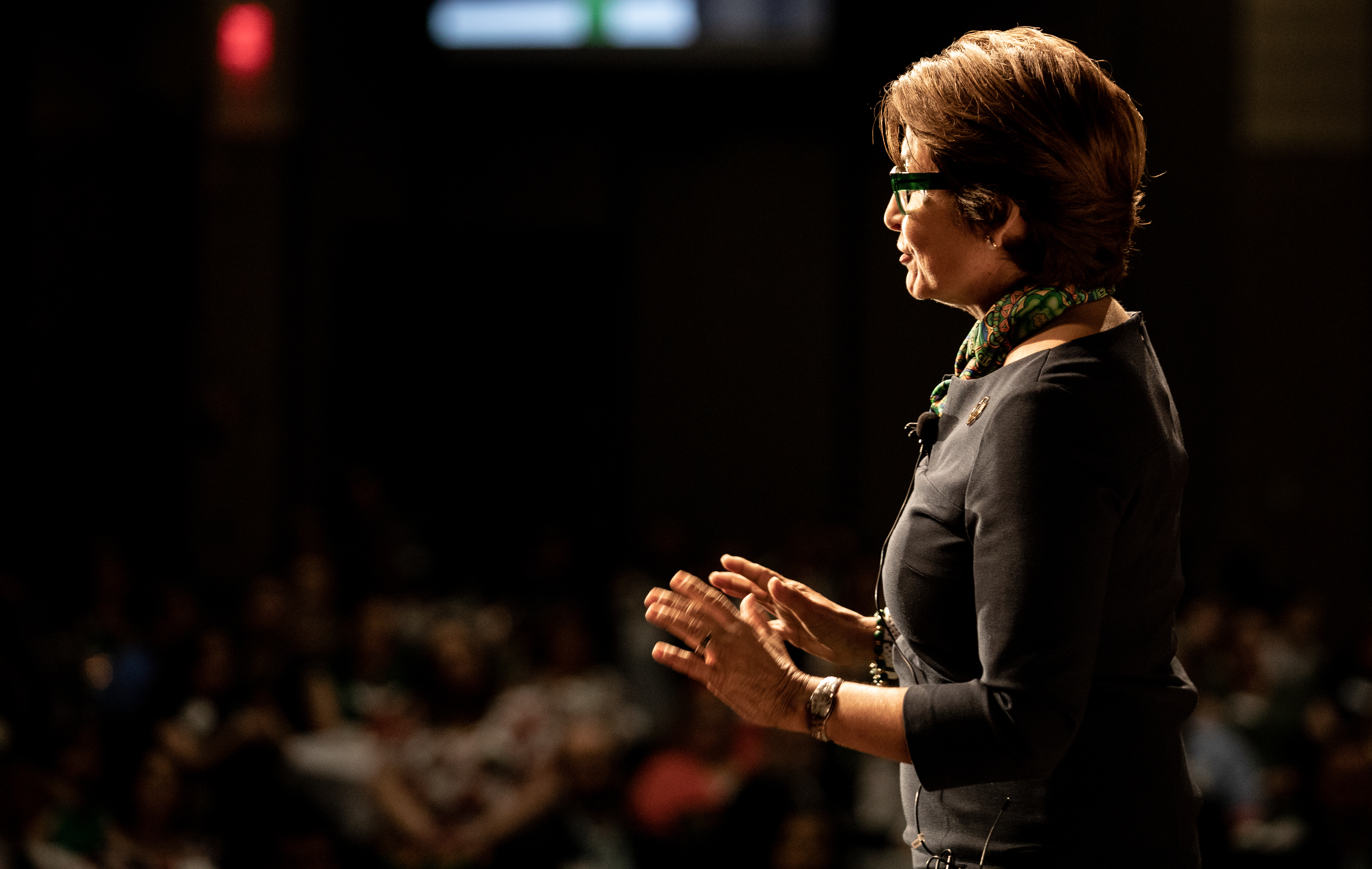
Sylvia Acevedo public speaking

== Career ==
=== Early career ===
Acevedo joined IBM in 1980 as an engineer while studying at Stanford University. During her time at IBM, Acevedo even helped redesign manufacturing facilities that later gained recognition internationally. She was on the Solar Polar Solar Probe (SPSP) and Voyager 2 teams at the NASA Jet Propulsion Laboratory. She joined Apple in 1988 overseeing the Asia-Pacific region. Acevedo held other executive roles at Autodesk, Dell, REBA Technologies, and Tandem Ungermann-Bass.

Acevedo founded Austin, Texas–based CommuniCard. She was awarded the Business Award by The Aguila Awards Foundation in 2005. In 2009, Acevedo joined the Girl Scouts of the USA national board of directors. President Barack Obama appointed Acevedo to the Commission on Educational Excellence for Hispanics in 2011. On the commission, she chaired the Early Childhood subcommittee.

=== Girl Scouts of the USA ===
Acevedo joined the national board of directors of the Girl Scouts of the USA (GSUSA) in 2009 and served on the board until 2016. She became interim chief executive officer in June 2016 and was named permanent CEO in May 2017, serving in the position until August 2020.

As CEO, Acevedo focused on expanding Girl Scouts' STEM programming and modernizing its programs and technology. During her tenure, the organization introduced more than 100 new badges and awards, including programs in as robotics, and cybersecurity, coding, engineering, data analytics, design thinking, and space science.

In 2017, Girl Scouts introduced 23 new STEM and outdoor badges, including six space science badges and nine robotics badges. The organization subsequently expanded its STEM offerings to include additional programming in areas such as engineering and computer science. Under Acevedo's leadership, Girl Scouts also emphasized outdoor activities, entrepreneurship, and leadership development as part of its national programming. She promoted the organization's cookie program as an entrepreneurship and financial-literacy experience and supported efforts to increase participation among girls in diverse communities.

In a Crain's New York interview, Acevedo said, “Girl Scouts has always been an important part of my life, helping me as a young girl to develop the skills to become a leader,” Acevedo said in a statement. “My focus [at GSUSA] has been to raise the profile of the Girl Scout movement and mission, with the targeted aim to grow membership.”

Acevedo left the position of CEO in August 2020 after four years leading the organization. During her tenure, GSUSA described the expansion of STEM programming and the modernization of its programs and technology as major organizational priorities.

=== Other leadership roles ===
Acevedo joined the board of directors of Qualcomm in November 2020 and serves on its Governance Committee. In January 2022, she was named a member of the board of directors for Credo Technology Group.

She joined the board of directors of Quark.ai, a generative AI startup, in 2023.

In July 2020, shareholders filed derivative lawsuits against Qualcomm's board over a lack of Black representation in its leadership, Acevedo joined the board that November.

In September 2025, the Fund for the City of New York hosted a book launch for Acevedo. This launch was for the release of her newly published book, The Trailblazer's Playbook She wrote the book to share a framework that she created called "Clarity-Courage-Conviction" and using her life stories to convey this idea.

In 2018, she was listed on Forbes’ "America's Top 50 Women In Tech." In 2018, Fast Company named Acevedo one of its “100 Most Creative People in Business”. She was awarded the 2019 Hispanic Heritage Award For Leadership. Later that year, she published her first memoir, "Path to the stars: My Journey from Girl Scout to Rocket Scientist"

In 2019, InStyle named Acevedo in The Badass 50: Meet the Women Who Are Changing the World.

== Publications ==
- 2025: The Trailblazer's Playbook: Practical Tactics to Rise Against the Odds and Achieve Excellence by Sylvia Acevedo
- 2020: "Creating welcoming communities for LGBTQ migrants: Living room-style chats for service providers" by Sylvia Acevedo, Oscar Rivera, Miriam Potocky, Mitra Naseh, Edward J Alessi, and Aaron Burgess
- 2018: Path To the Stars, My journey from Girl Scouts to Rocket Scientist, an aspirational middle school memoir by Sylvia Acevedo
- 2016: Critical Growth Needs for English Learner Preschoolers by Sylvia Acevedo
- 2016: UCLA White paper: "Realizing the Economic Advantages of a Multilingual Workforce" by Dr. Patricia Gandara & Sylvia Acevedo
