= Adam Grant =

American psychologist and author (born 1981)

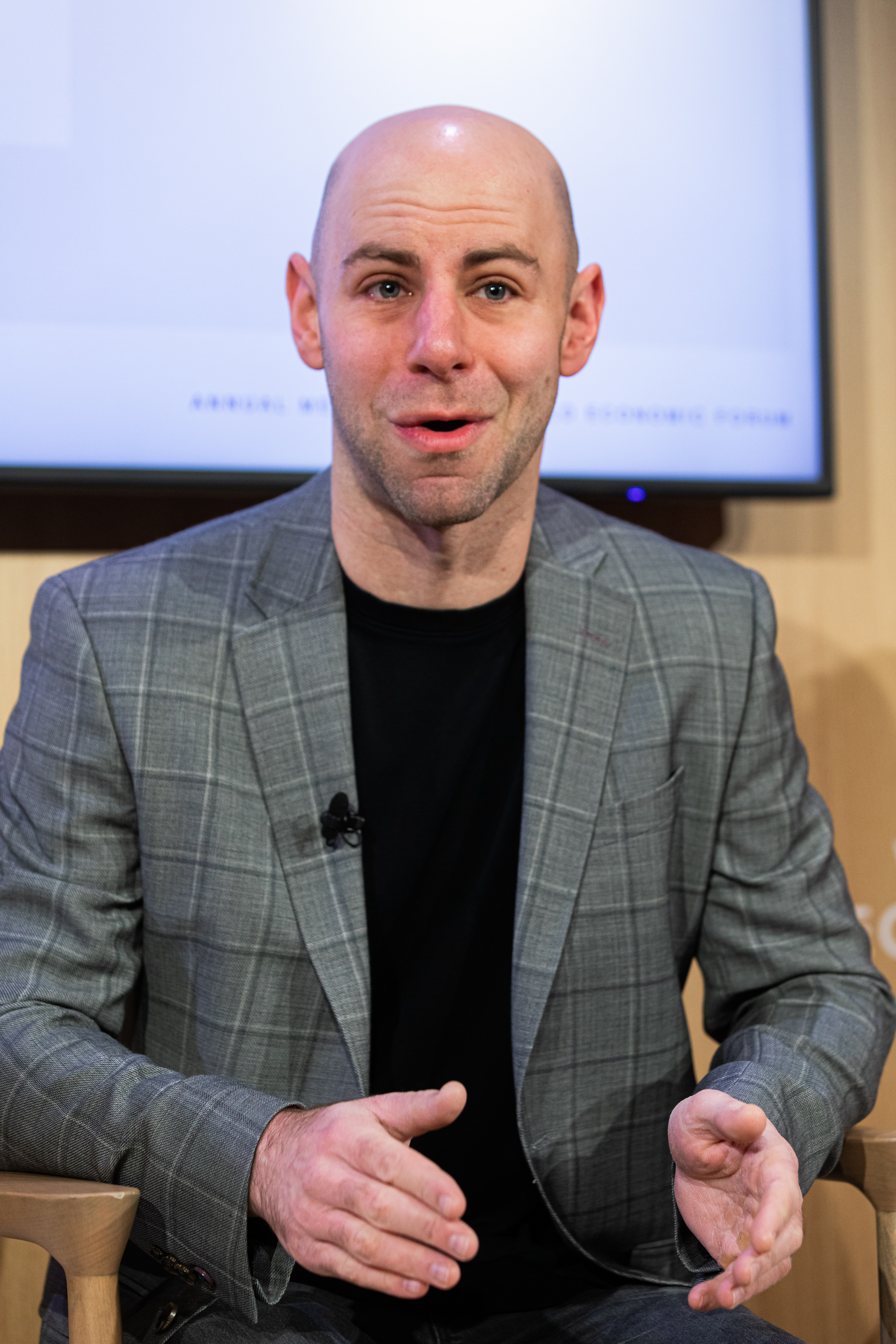
- Grant in 2023
- Born: August 13, 1981 (age 45); West Bloomfield, Michigan, U.S.
- Education: Harvard College; University of Michigan
- Occupations: Psychologist; professor; author
- Spouse: Allison Grant
- Children: 3
- Writing career
- Years active: 2007–present
- Genres: Organizational psychology; management; workplace dynamics
- Website: www.adamgrant.net

Adam M. Grant (born August 13, 1981) is an American popular science author, and professor at the Wharton School of the University of Pennsylvania specializing in organizational psychology.

== Early life and education ==
Grant was born in the township of West Bloomfield, Michigan, on August 13, 1981, to a lawyer father and a teacher mother. He grew up in the suburbs of Detroit, Michigan. Grant participated in springboard diving and aspired to be a professional basketball player growing up. During high school, he was named an All-American in 1999 in diving.

He received a B.A. from Harvard College, and M.S. and Ph.D. degrees from the University of Michigan in organizational psychology. He worked as a professional magician during college.

== Academic career ==
Grant was hired by the University of North Carolina at Chapel Hill to serve as an assistant professor of organizational behavior in 2007. After publishing a series of papers in academic journals, he was hired as an associate professor at the Wharton School of the University of Pennsylvania in 2009, becoming the school's youngest tenured professor at age 28. He was ranked by students the best professor at the university from 2011 to 2017.

== Business ==
Grant appears in a leaked list of members of Peter Thiel’s secret society, Dialog.

Grant is the host of the WorkLife and ReThinking podcasts.

In 2017 Grant co-founded (along with University of Michigan professor Wayne Baker and entrepreneur Cheryl Baker) Give and Take, Inc., a company that offers services designed to help organizations implement the principles from his book Give and Take.

Grant is on the board of LeanIn.Org and chairs the Creative Advisory board of EXILE Content.

== Personal life ==
While in graduate school, Grant married Allison; the couple have two daughters and a son.

== Research ==
Grant's research focuses on work motivation, job design, prosocial and proactive behaviors and procastination in organizations.

Much of his early work examined prosocial motivation which means the desire to benefit other people. In a 2008 paper, Grant reported two field studies, one of municipal firefighters and one of fundraising callers at a university call center. In both, prosocial motivation was more strongly linked to persistence, performance and productivity when employees were also intrinsically motivated. Firefighters who reported high levels of both types of motivation worked more overtime hours, and callers with high levels of both made more calls and raised more money.

In 2011, Grant and James W. Berry extended his work to creativity. In two field studies and a laboratory experiment, they found that intrinsic motivation was associated with higher creativity when prosocial motivation was also high, and that perspective taking accounted for this effect.

Also in 2011, Grant and psychologist Barry Schwartz published a review in Perspectives on Psychological Science arguing that many positive traits, states, and experiences have inverted-U-shaped effects, becoming harmful at high levels. Drawing on Aristotle's concept of the mean, they reviewed research on traits such as optimism, generosity, and empathy, and used research on choice overload as an extended example.

Grant has also studied procrastination. In a 2021 article, Grant and Jihae Shin reported two laboratory experiments and a field study at a South Korean furniture company, which found that that moderate procrastination was associated with more creative ideas than low or high procrastination. In the field study, this pattern held when employees were intrinsically motivated or their jobs required creativity, and procrastination was linked to lower task efficiency.

== Books ==
- Give and Take: A Revolutionary Approach to Success (Viking, 2013) ISBN 9780670026555
- Originals: How Non-Conformists Move the World (Viking, 2016) ISBN 9780525429562
- Option B: Facing Adversity, Building Resilience, and Finding Joy. with Sheryl Sandberg (Knopf, 2017) ISBN 9781524732684
- Think Again: The Power of Knowing What You Don't Know (Penguin, 2021). ISBN 9781984878106
- Hidden Potential: The Science of Achieving Greater Things (Penguin, 2023). ISBN 9780593653142
- Vibe: The Secrets of Strong Connections in a Lonely World (Penguin, 2026). ISBN 9798217059706

== Awards ==
- 2011 winner of the American Psychological Association Award for Distinguished Scientific Early Career Contributions to Psychology.
- 2015, named Young Global Leader by the World Economic Forum.
