= Minda Harts =

American author and public speaker

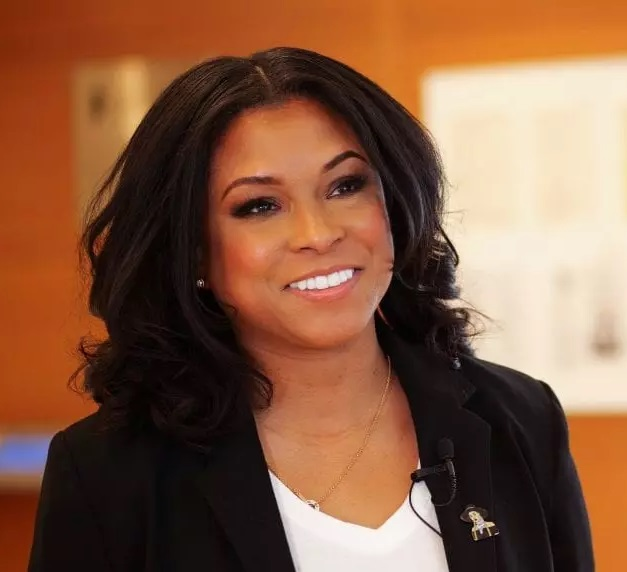
- Born: 1983 (age 42–43)
- Occupation: Podcaster
- Website: mindaharts.com

Minda Harts is an American author, public speaker, and workplace consultant. She is recognized for her work addressing inequity and lack of inclusion in the workplace, particularly focusing on the experiences of women of color. Harts has been described as an "ally" and is known for her career consulting boot camps, which are designed to support women of color in areas such as networking, salary negotiation, and career transitioning. She has also spoken extensively on the impact of the motherhood penalty on women of color.

== Early life and education ==
Harts, at the age of 11, moved from California to Illinois. She grew up in a predominantly white suburb of Chicago. At one point, her family's annual income was less than $25,000, and Harts worked at a local Dairy Queen to contribute to the household.

Inspired by Black professionals she saw on television, Harts became the first person in her family to attend and graduate college. She earned a degree in Communication from Western Illinois University and was also the first in her family to work in corporate America. Harts credits WIU professor Pete Jorgensen and her time working for the campus radio station for preparing her to be a public speaker and advocate.

== Career ==
After graduating from college, Harts faced significant challenges in the workforce, often finding herself as "the only" person of color in professional settings. She encountered microaggressions, was subjected to comments about her appearance, and faced obstacles in her career advancement. These experiences motivated her to adopt a proactive approach to addressing the difficulties she encountered in her career.

In 2015, Harts co-founded The Memo, an organization focused on career development for women of color, alongside Lauren Broussard. The name of the organization was inspired by a verse in the song "Trophies" by Young Money featuring Drake. The same year, Harts released her first book, The Memo: What Women of Color Need to Know to Secure a Seat at the Table, which was published on August 20, 2019. The book became a number one bestseller in the business and mentoring category. It provides an in-depth look at the racism and sexism women of color face in the workplace and offers strategies to help them achieve their career goals. The book has been compared to 2013's Lean In by Sheryl Sandberg, but tailored to the specific needs and experiences of women of color.

Harts is an advocate for human resources departments taking discrimination claims seriously, and she emphasizes the importance of effective management in creating a psychologically safe workplace where everyone can be their authentic selves. She has stated, "Two things can be true at the same time. Someone may not intend harm, not intend racism — but they may nevertheless cause harm, and cause it through racism."

Harts also became an adjunct assistant professor at NYU's Wagner School of Public Service.

Following the police killing of Breonna Taylor in 2020, Harts highlighted the issue of how Black women are often more celebrated after tragedy than during their lives. That same year, LinkedIn named her the Top Voice for Equity in the Workplace. Harts also launched her weekly career podcast for women of color, Secure the Seat.

In 2021, Harts expanded her consulting efforts, working with over 100 companies, including several Fortune 500 firms, to conduct diversity and inclusion training, solicit employee feedback on company culture, and conduct pay equity reports. She also published her second book, Right Within: How We Heal From Racial Trauma in the Workplace, inspired by a verse in the song "Doo Wop (That Thing)" by Lauryn Hill. The book discusses the systemic challenges in workplace cultures and their impact on Black women, emphasizing the importance of self-preservation and mental health. Time magazine named it one of the "8 New Books You Should Read" in October 2021.

In 2022, Harts was named by Business Insider as one of the 100 People Transforming Business. She also founded Queen of Harts Productions, a company that brought The Memo Monologues to Twitter Spaces during Women's History Month and Black Women's Equal Pay Day 2022.

In 2024, The Memo: What Women of Color Need to Know to Secure a Seat at the Table was adapted into a psychological thriller film. The film, which starred Kyla Pratt and featured a score by rapper MC Lyte, was produced by Valeisha Butterfield’s Seed Media, marking Harts' first film project. Harts is working on her fourth book, Talk To Me Nice, about restoring trust in the workplace (2025). United Talent Agency represents her.

== Awards and honors ==
In 2016, Harts was recognized as a Change Maker at the State of Women's Summit in Washington, D.C. hosted by Oprah Winfrey and former First Lady Michelle Obama. Six years later, she received a Trailblazer Award from the Bowman Foundation and was named one of Business Insider's 100 People Transforming Business.

== Legacy ==
In honor of her mother, Harts established the Marchet Harts Communication Scholarship Award for Women of Color at Western Illinois University, who graduated from the university in 2004. According to Minda, "It was important to put this scholarship in my mother’s name as a way to show gratitude for her rooting me on at each stage of my career."

== Bibliography ==
- The Memo: What Women of Color Need to Know to Secure a Seat at the Table (2019)
- Right Within: How We Heal From Racial Trauma in the Workplace (2021)
- You Are More Than Magic: The Black and Brown Girls' Guide to Finding Your Voice (2021)

== Personal life ==
Minda felt the need to shorten her first name – Yasminda – in order "to make people feel comfortable with how I show up at work."

Harts has openly discussed her challenges with fibroids, a condition that has affected her weight and her ability to have children naturally.

== See also ==
- Christine Michel Carter
- Bozoma Saint John
- Valeisha Butterfield
