= Valeisha Butterfield =

American businesswoman

- Born: January 30, 1978
- Education: Clark Atlanta University
- Occupations: Former Co-president, The Recording Academy
- Years active: 2021–2022
- Spouse: Dahntay Jones (2011–2022)
- Parent(s): Jean Farmer-Butterfield; G. K. Butterfield

Valeisha Butterfield is an American businesswoman. She was the Vice President of Partnerships & Engagement at Google, Inc and was formerly co-president of The Recording Academy.

== Early life and education ==
Butterfield Jones was born and raised in Wilson, North Carolina. She is the daughter of U.S. Congressman G. K. Butterfield and North Carolina State Legislator Jean Farmer-Butterfield. She graduated from Clark Atlanta University in 2000.

== Career ==
In 2009 she was deputy director of public affairs at the Department of Commerce during the first part of the Obama administration. Between 2011 and 2012 she was part of the Obama for America campaign, as national youth vote director.

In 2016 she worked at Google as global head of women and black community engagement. She organized Decoding Race, an international event for Google employees.

In 2020 she was appointed chief diversity and inclusion officer of The Recording Academy, and in June 2021 became co-president of the company.

In 2024, under her production company Seed Media, Butterfield produced a film adaptation of the book The Memo: What Women of Color Need to Know to Secure a Seat at the Table by Minda Harts. The film, titled The Memo and adapted into a psychological thriller, starred Kyla Pratt and featured a score by rapper MC Lyte.

== Awards ==
- 2017: 14th Annual McDonald's 365Black Awards - Honoree
- 2020: 14th Annual ADCOLOR Awards - Honoree

== Personal life ==
Butterfield was married to NBA champion Dahntay Jones from 2011 to 2022. The two share two children, Dahntay Jr. and Dillon.
