= Nscale =

British AI infrastructure provider

- Type: Private
- Industry: AI Infrastructure
- Founded: May 2024; 2 years ago in London, United Kingdom
- Founder: Josh Payne
- Headquarters: London, United Kingdom
- Products: AI Services, AI Private Cloud, AI Factories
- Revenue: 33,000,000 United States dollar (2025)
- Number of employees: ~1,000
- Website: https://www.nscale.com/

Nscale is a British technology company that operates data centres and GPU cloud infrastructure. Headquartered in London, Nscale was founded in 2024 by Josh Payne. It operates across the US, Europe, and in Asia.

== History ==
Nscale spun out from Arkon Energy, a Melbourne, Australia-based infrastructure business focused first on securing power and building in ideal AI compute location, including those with abundant renewable energy sources and a provider of infrastructure for crypto mining. Arkon was based in Melbourne, and Payne is Australian. Arkon Energy wound down and Nscale acquired a data centre site in Glomfjord, Norway, which utilizes 100% renewable hydropower.

In December 2024, the company closed its Series A investment round at $155 million.

In 2025, Nscale announced partnerships with technology companies and participation in government-backed initiatives focused on sovereign AI infrastructure in the UK and Europe.

In July 2025, Nscale announced a joint venture with Aker ASA to build an AI infrastructure project in Narvik with Microsoft as the anchor customer. In September 2025, Nscale raised $1.1 billion in Series B funding, recognized as one of the largest Series B rounds in Europe, from companies including Aker, NVIDIA, Nokia, and Dell.

By October 2025, Nscale secured $433 million in a pre-Series C SAFE funding round and had expanded into Portugal, the UK, US, and Iceland.

In March 2026, Nscale raised $2 billion in its Series C funding round as former Meta COO Sheryl Sandberg, former Yahoo! president Susan Decker, and former U.K. deputy prime minister Nick Clegg joined its board of directors. The company achieved a valuation of $14.6 billion in March 2026.

=== Data centres ===
As of 2026, Nscale operates data centres across multiple geographies with sites at varying stages of operation and development.

Nscale’s first operational site in Glomfjord, Norway has a 30-megawatt capacity on 100% renewable hydropower. A second site announced in July 2025 is under development at Narvik, with 230 megawatts of planned capacity and over 30,000 NVIDIA Vera Rubin GPUs being deployed for Microsoft from 2027. The Narvik site was initially announced as part of a joint venture with Aker ASA. Microsoft is the campus’ anchor customer.

Nscale operates a 15-megawatt liquid-cooled GPU cluster at Verne Global's data centre campus in Iceland, powered by 100% renewable energy.

In Portugal, Nscale operates at Start Campus's Sines data centre. The first building is operational and delivering approximately 12,600 NVIDIA Blackwell Ultra GPUs to Microsoft. A second building is under development with approximately 66,000 NVIDIA Rubin GPUs planned for delivery to Microsoft from late 2027.

Nscale is developing a hyperscale AI campus in Ward County, Texas, with approximately 104,000 NVIDIA GPUs planned for Microsoft from 2026. Nscale also acquired American Intelligence and Power Corporation (AIPCorp) and its Monarch Compute Campus in Mason County, West Virginia from Fidelis New Energy. The Monarch Compute Campus is a 2,250-acre site with planned power capacity of 2 gigawatts by 2028, expanding to over 8 gigawatts by 2031. Monarch operates as America's first state-certified AI microgrid, using behind-the-meter power generation.

== Partnerships and projects ==
Microsoft has contracted GPU capacity across Nscale's sites in Norway, Portugal, the United Kingdom, and the United States. Nscale has a partnership with Microsoft to supply the tech firm with over 200,000 NVIDIA chips.

NVIDIA, strategic partner and investor, hardware supports Nscale's GPU infrastructure globally, including the NVIDIA Vera Rubin NVL72 and Blackwell Ultra platforms.

In September 2024, Nscale partnered with Singtel to expand Graphics Processing Unit as a Service (GPUaaS) capacity across Europe and Southeast Asia. The agreement provided Nscale access to NVIDIA H100 GPUs through Singtel’s Paragon platform and data centre infrastructure from Nxera, while Singtel gained access to Nscale’s AMD and NVIDIA accelerator capacity in Europe for regional AI workloads.

Vast Data partnered with Nscale in October 2025 to deploy Vast Data's AI Operating System as the data layer for Nscale's global AI cloud infrastructure.

Aker ASA, a Norwegian industrial investment company and strategic partner participated in both the Series B and Series C funding rounds and was previously a joint venture partner in Norway.

Nokia, a strategic partner and Series B and Series C investor, is building the IP network infrastructure for Nscale's data centres and connectivity layer.

Dell Technologies, a technology partner and Series B and Series C investor, partners with Nscale to deploy the Dell AI Factory with NVIDIA as the validated hardware architecture for its high-density AI compute deployments.

BT partnered with Nscale in 2026 to deliver sovereign AI data centre infrastructure across three BT sites in the United Kingdom in partnership with NVIDIA.

== Finances ==
Nscale's audited revenue was $19.1 million in 2024 and $33.0 million in 2025, with $140.6 million in the first half of 2026, according to its Form S-1; the filing also states $103.4 billion in active and contracted take-or-pay agreements.
