= Lean Out: The Struggle for Gender Equality in Tech and Start-up Culture =

2015 book by Elissa Shevinsky

Lean Out
- First edition
- Author: Elissa Shevinsky
- Published: 2015
- Publisher: OR Books
- Pages: 284
- ISBN: 978-1-939293-86-2

Lean Out: The Struggle for Gender Equality in Tech and Start-Up Culture is a 2015 book written by Elissa Shevinsky, an information security entrepreneur and feminist. Shevinsky wrote it in response to Sheryl Sandberg's Lean In, a book often criticized by feminists as being unrealistic in its expectations on women.

== Reactions ==
The book was listed by Inc. as one of the 100 best business books of 2015.

Newspaper reviews have been nearly universal in their approbation of Shevinsky's work, with the Los Angeles Times saying "the book is not just directed at women who might want to opt out of the rat race and start their own thing. This book is packed with stories — and statistics — that should give anyone in tech management pause."

At least one review notes that "the essays end up varying widely in quality, radical message, level of editing, and scope. Among incisive critiques of nerd sociology and important stories of micro and macro aggressions, there are also far too many unnecessarily long resumes and capitalist self-help manuals in the book."
