= Wayne Baker =

American author and academic

Wayne E. Baker is an American author and sociologist on the senior faculty of the University of Michigan Ross School of Business. His teaching and research interests are in the fields of values, American society, social capital, social networks and economic sociology. Baker is best known both for his research in economic sociology, where he demonstrated that financial markets operate as social networks, and his survey research on values, where he documented Americans' core values. His data show Americans share more core values than news media and political campaigns will admit. These core values include patriotism, belief in God, individualism, success, equal opportunities, freedom and liberty, respect and the free market. He writes in both academic and popular media on this theme and is often invited to present his findings across the U.S

== Biography ==
Baker earned his M.A. in sociology and a B.S. in finance, summa cum laude, from Northern Illinois University. From there he earned his doctorate in sociology from Northwestern University and held a post-doctoral fellowship at Harvard University.

Prior to joining the University of Michigan Ross faculty in 1995, he was on the faculty at the University of Chicago Graduate School of Business. He also worked as a partner and senior manager of TSG, Inc., a Washington, D.C.-based management consulting firm.

In 2000, Baker led and organized the movement to create the Section on Economic Sociology of the American Sociological Association. Baker was the first director of the Center for Positive Organizational Scholarship at the Ross School of Business. He was Principal Investigator and Team leader for the Detroit Arab American Study, funded by the Russell Sage Foundation, the Andrew W. Mellon Foundation, and the University of Michigan. He was also Principal Investigator of the 2003 Detroit Area Study, funded by the Russell Sage Foundation and the University of Michigan.

== Current work ==
Wayne Baker is Robert P. Thome Professor of Business Administration and Professor of Management & Organizations at the Ross School of Business, and Faculty Director of the Center for Positive Organizations. He is also Professor of Sociology at the University of Michigan and Faculty Associate at the Institute for Social Research. Baker teaches in the Ph.D., MBA, BBA, and Executive Education programs. Baker is frequently a guest panellist at conferences and university forums, and has spoken on both NPR C-Span, and frequent collaborator with Harvard Business Review.

Baker leads the Americans' Evolving Values project at the Institute for Social Research. The purpose of this project is to create a barometer of American values. This initiative has conducted several national surveys of the values of Americans. His daily online magazine OurValues.org promotes civil conversation on American ethics and values. Founded in May 2008, the blog addresses the day's most pressing issues Baker is also a contributing columnist for the Huffington Post.

Baker is a co-founder and board member of Give and Take, Inc., a company he created with Adam Grant and Cheryl Baker. Give and Take makes a software called Givitas a web-based, a SaaS platform designed to give employees equal access to the collective intelligence, knowledge, experience, and expertise of their peers, making it easy to ask for and offer help at work. He's also co-creator of the Reciprocity Ring, a group exercise built around asking for and giving help at work, used in hundreds of corporations and 17 of the top 20 business schools.

== Research on core values ==
Baker began researching values in 1996, and in 1998 discovered the core aspects of them. His major findings appeared in 2005 in the book America's Crisis of Values: Reality and Perception. Baker defines a core value as strongly and widely held, stable over time, and shared across demographic and political lines. Among the core values his research shows are widely held by American adults are: patriotism, belief in God, individualism, desire to succeed, equality of opportunities and freedom of expression. Baker continues to research American values, and published United America in 2014, which combined his research with reader comments from his blog to start a nationwide conversation about shared American values. Baker believes dialogue over shared values is the key to bridging political divides.

== Selected publications ==
Baker has published six books, two of which were bestsellers, and over sixty articles-

1. All You Have to Do Is Ask: A set of tools for mastering the one skill standing between us and success: the ability to ask for the things we need to succeed. New York: Penguin Random House, 2020. ISBN 9781984825926.
2. United America: The surprising truth about American values, American identity and the 10 beliefs that a large majority of Americans hold dear. Canton: Read the Spirit Press, 2014. ISBN 978-1939880291
3. America's Crisis of Values: Reality and Perception. New Jersey: Princeton University Press, 2005. ISBN 978-0-691-11794-2
4. Citizenship and Crisis: Arab Detroit After 9/11. New York: Russell Sage Foundation Press, 2009. (with Sally Howell, Ann Chih Lin, Andrew Shryock, Amaney Jamal and Ron Stockton) ISBN 978-0-87154-052-2
5. Achieving Success Through Social Capital: Tapping the Hidden Resources in Your Personal and Business Networks. San Francisco: Jossey-Bass, 2000. ISBN 978-0-7879-5309-6
6. Networking Smart: How to Build Relationships for Personal and Organizational Success. 1994. New York: McGraw-Hill. ISBN 978-0-595-00786-8

Modernization, Cultural Change and the Persistence of Traditional Values. (with Ronald Inglehart) American Sociological Review: Vol 65: 19–51, 2000.

The Duality of American Moral Culture. The Handbook of the Sociology of Morality, Springer-Science, 2010.

Hazards of the Market: The Continuity and Dissolution of Interorganizational Market Relationships. (with Robert R. Faulkner and Gene A. Fisher). American Sociological Review 63:147-177, 1998. The Social Organization of Conspiracy: Illegal Networks in the Heavy Electrical Equipment Industry. (with Robert R. Faulkner). American Sociological Review, 58:837-860, 1993.

Information Networks and Market Behavior. (with Ananth Iyer). Journal of Mathematical Sociology, 16:305-332. 1992.

The Social Structure of a National Securities Market. American Journal of Sociology 89:775‑811. 1984.

== Quotes ==
"Is America bitterly divided? Has America lost its traditional values? Many politicians and religious leaders believe so, as do the majority of Americans. But the evidence shows overwhelmingly that America has not lost its traditional values, that the nation compares favorably with most other societies, and that the culture war is largely a myth." –America's Crisis of Values

"One reason I like surveys is that a survey is a very democratic instrument. You bypass our leaders, you bypass everyone and you go right to the people and say, 'What do you think?'"

"Maybe what we're hearing from our politicians in Washington about how bad things are, how divided we are, maybe that's not true. Maybe the American people are sensible and do have this common ground."

== Awards and honors ==
Baker won the Emory Williams Award for Excellence in Teaching, the Max Weber Award for Distinguished Scholarship (with Robert Faulkner), the Joanne Martin Trailblazer Award, (shared with members of the Center for Positive Organizational Scholarship), and the SO!WHAT! Award for the best article published in Strategic Organization (with Gerald Davis and Mina Yoo.) Networking Smart was named "one of the thirty best business books of 1994" by Executive Book Summaries.
