= Dave Goldberg =

American businessman (1967–2015)

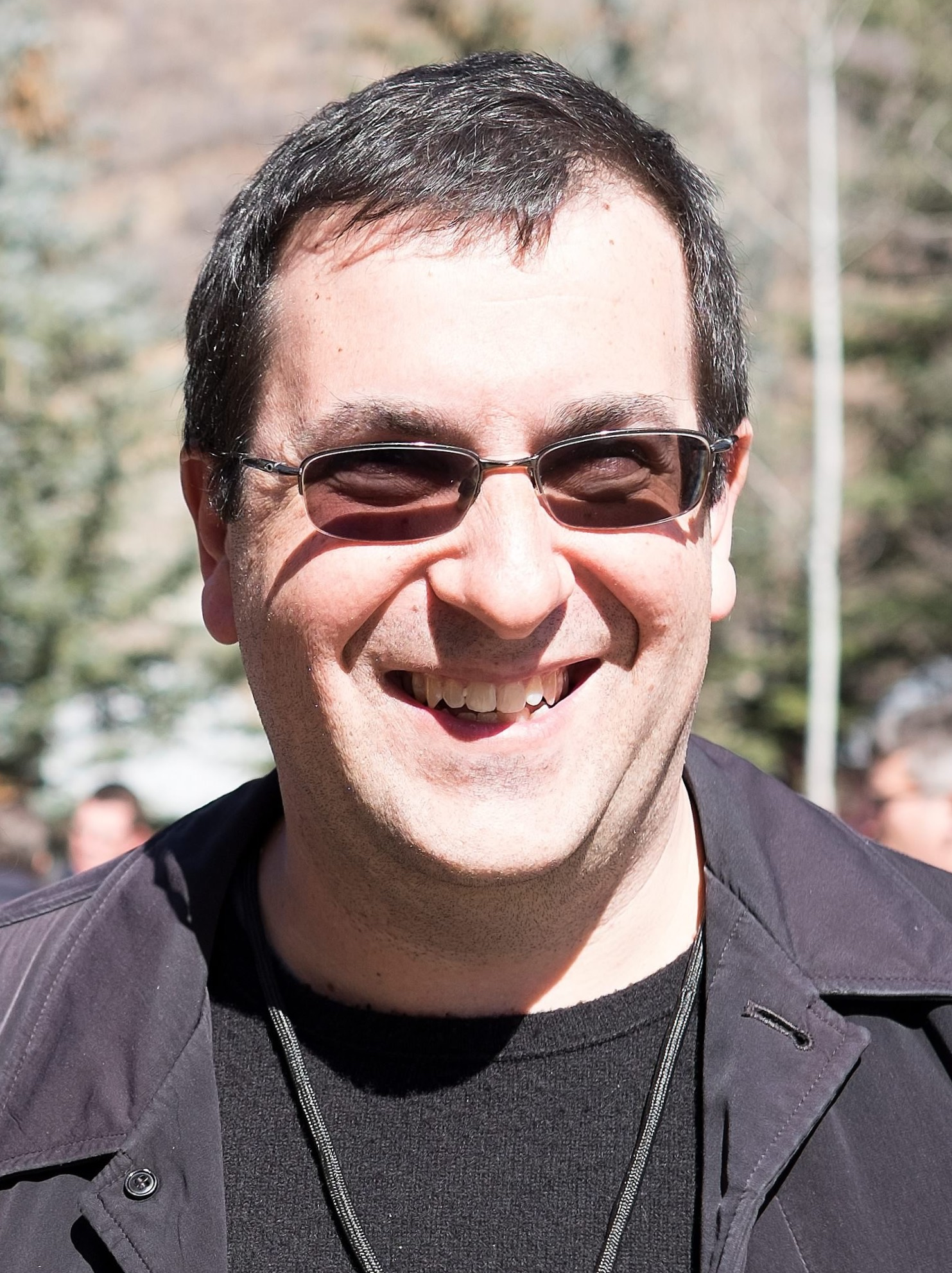
- Born: David Bruce Goldberg; October 2, 1967; Chicago, Illinois, U.S.
- Died: May 1, 2015 (aged 47); Nuevo Vallarta, Mexico
- Education: Harvard University (BA)
- Occupation: CEO of SurveyMonkey
- Years active: 1989–2015
- Spouse: Sheryl Sandberg (m. 2004)
- Children: 2

David Bruce Goldberg (October 2, 1967 – May 1, 2015) was an American management consultant and businessman. He was the founder of LAUNCH Media and the CEO of SurveyMonkey. He was married to Sheryl Sandberg, COO of Facebook.

== Early life and education ==
Goldberg was born in a Jewish family in Chicago, Illinois, on October 2, 1967 and grew up in Minneapolis, Minnesota. His mother, Paula Goldberg (1942-2022), was co-founder and executive director of the Pacer Center, and his father, Melvin Bert "Mel" Goldberg (1942–1998), was associate dean and professor at the William Mitchell College of Law. He interned at the Minneapolis Star Tribune newspaper while in high school. He graduated from Blake School in Minneapolis in 1985, and graduated magna cum laude from Harvard University in 1989, majoring in history and government. Goldberg was an enthusiastic Minnesota Vikings fan throughout his life.

== Career ==
Goldberg worked for Bain & Company for two years after graduating from college. He had planned to attend law school but instead joined Capitol Records, where he served as director of marketing strategy and new business development. He founded LAUNCH Media in 1994, and led it through its acquisition by Yahoo Inc. in 2001. He quit Yahoo in 2007 and joined Benchmark Capital. He then joined SurveyMonkey in 2009.

== Personal life ==
In 2004, Goldberg married Sheryl Sandberg. The couple had two children and lived in Menlo Park, California. Prior to his death, he and Sandberg were active philanthropists, signing The Giving Pledge.

== Death and memorials ==
On May 1, 2015, Goldberg died suddenly while vacationing with Sandberg at a private beach-front villa near the Four Seasons Hotels and Resorts in Punta Mita, Mexico; he was pronounced dead at a hospital in Nuevo Vallarta. Goldberg's death was initially attributed to falling off a treadmill while exercising at a gym and suffering head trauma and blood loss. Sandberg has subsequently said that her husband's death was due to an arrhythmia caused by undiagnosed coronary artery disease, and not due to falling from a treadmill.

Mark Zuckerberg, Facebook's chief executive, said in a post that Goldberg was "an amazing person and I am glad I got to know him." "One of the truly great people on the planet, Dave was of almost unimaginably remarkable character," said Dick Costolo, Twitter's chief executive. "One of kindest and most generous friends I've known," said Jeff Weiner, chief executive of LinkedIn.

Professional poker player Phil Hellmuth, who was a friend, donated his historic 14th World Series of Poker bracelet to Goldberg's family.

A memorial service for Goldberg was held at Stanford Memorial Auditorium on the Stanford University campus on May 5, 2015. The 90-minute service was attended by many members of what Fortune described as "the elite of Silicon Valley," as well as U2 frontman Bono, who performed his song "One," and actor Ben Affleck. Affleck had worked with Goldberg when he served on the Board of Directors of a company he co-founded called Live Planet and the two had also worked together on The Eastern Congo Initiative, for which Goldberg helped Affleck raise funds.

Sheryl Sandberg, Goldberg's wife, wrote a Facebook post with an essay commemorating Goldberg 30 days after his death (sheloshim period), talking about her own struggle overcoming the grief of his death and the support that her loved ones had given her in this difficult time. The post was liked by more than 900,000 people, shared 400,000 times, and received over 70,000 comments. It was also discussed in Business Insider and The New York Times.
