= Clara Shih =

American businesswoman

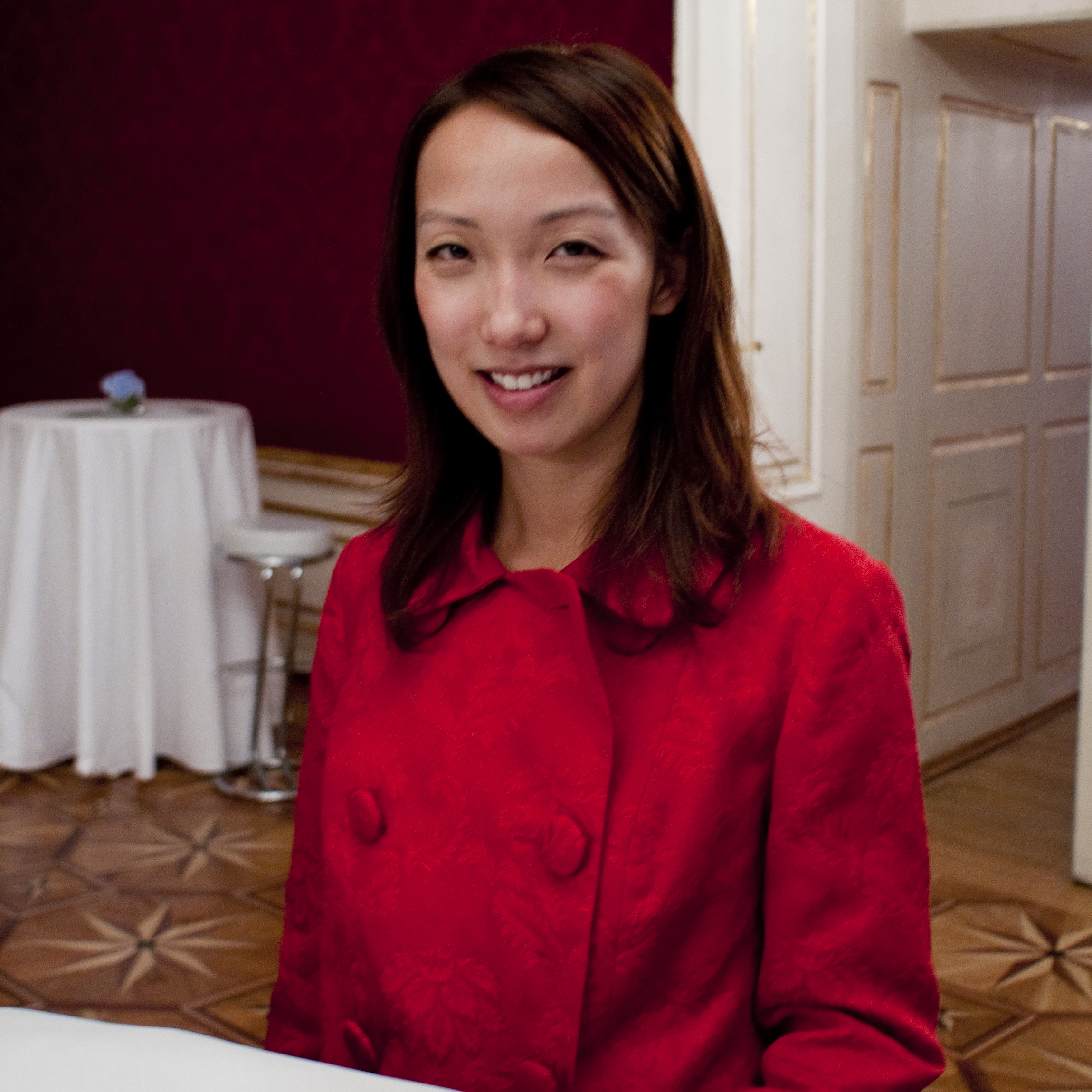
- Shih in 2010
- Born: January 11, 1982 (age 44); Hong Kong
- Education: Stanford University (BS, MS); University of Oxford (MSc)
- Occupation: CEO of Hearsay Social
- Board member of: Starbucks; Ad Council
- Spouse: Daniel Chao (m. 2011)

Clara Shih
- Traditional Chinese: 史宗瑋
Transcriptions

Clara Chung-wai Shih (born January 11, 1982) is an American businesswoman. She is the chairperson and former CEO of Hearsay Social, the digital software company she co-founded in 2009. Since November 2024, Shih leads the Business AI group at Meta Platforms.

== Early life and education ==
Shih was born in Hong Kong. Her father, a math professor in Hong Kong, later became an electrical engineer in the United States. Her mother was an artist who became a bilingual and special-education teacher after the family immigrated to the U.S. Shih and her family emigrated to Akron, Ohio, when she was 4. In elementary school, she was initially placed in special classes for kids with speech impediments because the school did not have a program in English as a second language. Subsequently, Shih's family relocated to Chicago. In eighth grade, she scored a 1420 on the SAT out of 1600.

Shih attended Illinois Mathematics and Science Academy, where she participated in the women's varsity tennis team, orchestra, the student newspaper, the debate team, and the Mu Alpha Theta Mathematics Honor Society. She volunteered as an English tutor for immigrant children. At 15, she helped develop materials in K-12 physics education at Fermilab. Shih was named the Presidential Scholar and graduated in 2000.

Shih attended Stanford University, and co-founded the Stanford engineering public service center. She was the president of the campus chapter of the Institute of Electrical and Electronics Engineers, officer in the Stanford Society of Women Engineers, and was elected to Tau Beta Pi Engineering Honor Society. In addition to her extracurricular activities, Shih founded Camp Amelia Technology Literacy Group, a nonprofit organization that creates software aimed at improving basic education in underserved communities in the United States and developing countries. She was named a Microsoft Women's Scholar and became an intern at Microsoft, where she developed the RSS news aggregator for Outlook. In her spare time, Shih volunteered in East Palo Alto, California, and taught low-income elementary students to become interested in math, science and technology. She was also named a Mayfield Fellow in her senior year, a Merage Foundation for the American Dream Fellow, a Google Anita Borg Scholar, a Microsoft Women's Scholar, and a Society of Women Engineers Scholar. Shih majored in computer science; she graduated with honors with a bachelor's degree and a master's degree in computer science from Stanford in 2005.

In 2005, Shih was awarded the Marshall Scholarship and attended University of Oxford. She received a master's degree in Internet studies from the University of Oxford Internet Institute.

== Career ==
After graduating from Oxford, Shih stayed in England and worked in corporate strategy at Google. Shih joined Salesforce.com in 2006 as a founding product marketer on the AppExchange. As a side project, she built a business application on Facebook, known as "Faceforce". The application turned out to be successful, and Shih recruited her old classmate, Steve Garrity, from Microsoft to develop Hearsay Social.

Shih has served as the chief executive officer and co-founder of Hearsay Social since 2009. In December 2011, she was also elected to the Starbucks board of directors, replacing Facebook chief operating officer Sheryl Sandberg. In 2020, she transitioned to the role of executive chairperson of Hearsay.

Shih has received several awards for her achievements, including recognition as one of the most impactful Asian by Gold House (2024), a Young Global Leader by the World Economic Forum, the Fortune 40 Under 40 (2012), and the Ad Age 40 Under 40 (2012).

In February 2021, after an 11-year hiatus, Shih rejoined Salesforce.com, the software-as-a-service customer relationship management company, as the company's CEO of Service Cloud CRM software business. In this role, Shih replaced Bill Patterson, who moved on to be the general manager of Salesforce's overall CRM software business. Shih was then appointed as CEO of Salesforce AI in May 2023. She left Salesforce in November 2024 and joined Meta Platforms to lead its newly formed Business AI group. Shih joined the board of HubSpot in November 2025.

== Personal life ==
Shih is married to health technology entrepreneur Daniel Chao. They live in San Francisco, California.

== Published works ==
- Shih, Clara (2009). The Facebook Era: Tapping Online Social Networks to Build Better Products, Reach New Audiences, and Sell More Stuff. Prentice Hall. ISBN 9780137152223.
- Shih, Clara (2016). The Social Business Imperative: Adapting Your Business Model to the Always-Connected Customer. Prentice Hall.
