= Anna Maria Chávez =

American nonprofit chief executive (born 1968)

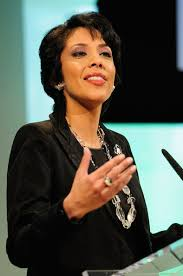
- Chávez in 2012
- Born: 1968 (age 57–58); Eloy, Arizona, US
- Education: Yale University, University of Arizona
- Known for: Former CEO of Girl Scouts of the USA
- Predecessor: Kathy Cloninger

Anna Maria Chávez (born 1968) is an American attorney, inspirational speaker, writer and community leader. Most recently, Chávez served as the chief executive officer of the Girl Scouts of the USA (2011–2016) and was the first woman of color to head the organization.

== Biography ==
Anna Maria Chávez was born in 1968 in the small farm town of Eloy, Arizona and is of Mexican-American heritage. She joined the Girl Scouts as a child. Her family moved to Phoenix, Arizona during her high school years. She attended Yale University, where she earned a Bachelor of Arts in American History. She attended James E. Rogers College of Law at the University of Arizona, received the Juris Doctor degree, and was admitted to the bar of the Arizona Supreme Court, the bar of the U.S. District Court for the District of Arizona and, ultimately, the bar of the U.S. Supreme Court. Anna currently resides in New Jersey. She is married to Robert, a financial industry executive, and they have a son, Michael.

== Career ==
After law school, she served as legal counsel to the Federal Highway Administration in Washington D.C. She also served as an attorney advisor in the Office of the Counsel to the President. During her time in Washington, she served as public policy advisor to several offices including U.S Secretary of Transportation and the offices of Government Contracting, Size Standards, Technology, and Small Disadvantaged Business Certification and Eligibility.

Prior to joining the Girl Scouts organization, Chávez served as Director of Intergovernmental Affairs for then-Governor of Arizona, Janet Napolitano. From November 2003 to January 2007, she worked with city, state, tribal, and community organizations to promote the Governor's policies and initiatives, eventually being appointed Deputy Chief of Staff.

In 2009, the Girl Scouts of Southwest Texas appointed Chávez as CEO and in 2011 she was appointed CEO of Girl Scouts of the USA, where she served until 2016. Today, she travels the country speaking to aspiring and current leaders on effective, moral leadership.

== Accomplishments ==
In 2012, Chávez received the Chairman's Award from the United States Hispanic Chamber of Commerce and the Women of Excellence Award from the Women of the Association of Latino Professionals in Finance and Accounting. While acting as CEO of the Girl Scouts of the USA, Chávez managed to sustain recognition for the Girl Scouts by The Harris Poll, Fast Company, and Hispanic Executive. She has also been recognized for her work in STEM (Science, Technology, Engineering and Math) technologies and increasing the participation of Girl Scouts in STEM-related fields. She is recognized as one of the 100 Women in STEM by STEMConnector. Chávez gave the keynote address at The Alumni Society's 2016 Leadership Summit. Most recently, Chávez was also named one of Fortune Magazine’s 50 Greatest Leaders.

=== The "Ban Bossy" Campaign ===
The Ban Bossy social media campaign is co-sponsored by Leanin.org and the Girl Scouts of the USA. It encourages young girls to become leaders and aims to remove the stigma associated with the word bossy. In addition to Chávez, the campaign features some of the nation's most influential women, including Facebook executive Sheryl Sandberg, former Secretary of State Condoleezza Rice, pop-star Beyoncé, designer Diane Von Furstenberg.
