= Elissa Shevinsky =

American technology executive

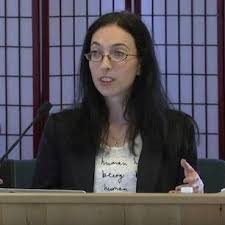
- Born: Elissa Beth Shevinsky; New York City, U.S.
- Education: Williams College, CUNY Baruch College School of Business,
- Occupations: Author, entrepreneur, cybersecurity expert
- Years active: 1999–present

Elissa Shevinsky is an American technology executive, entrepreneur, cybersecurity expert, public speaker, and author. She was instrumental in the movement to advocate for women in tech, through her book Lean Out, in 2015, and was known for saying that women have always played a role in significant computer and internet advances.

== Education ==
Shevinsky attended Benjamin Cardozo High School, before studying for a Political Theory major at Williams College, where she also took classes in Computer Science, graduating in 2001.

== Career ==
Shevinsky has been a cofounder of multiple start up companies, including Menagerie Networks and MakeOut Labs, before cofounding Glimpse. In 2010, Shevinsky defended her company against The New York Times, as co-owner of Neighborhoodies, over the use of the "New York Herald Tribune" logo on T-shirts. Shevinsky argued that the trademark had been abandoned. In 2012, she founded two NYC-focused dating sites, MakeOut Labs and JoinJspot. Shevinsky co-founded Glimpse, an encrypted photo and video-sharing app, with Pax Dickinson in 2013. At Glimpse, Shevinsky was chief executive of the company. It was at this time that Shevinsky was known for her actions standing up for professionalism in the tech industry. In 2015 Shevinsky was funded by MACH37 for JeKuDo Privacy Company, co-organized information security conference SecretCon, and edited Lean Out: The Struggle for Gender Equality in Tech and Start-up Culture. Later that year, she appeared on PBS NewsHour to discuss the Cybersecurity Information Sharing Act, arguing that the law would compromise customer privacy without meaningfully improving security. In 2016, Shevinsky joined Brave as Head of Product. As of 2019 Shevinsky was the CEO at Faster Than Light, a cybersecurity company.

Shevinsky is also known for her actions supporting civility and professionalism in the tech industry. In a 2015 post on harassment and trolling in Silicon Valley, Shevinsky wrote: "I'd like to see less harassment. That's my position. Less harassment, for everyone. I do hope this isn't a controversial statement." As a Press Lead for the 2018 HOPE conference in NYC, Shevinsky called for stronger enforcement of the Code of Conduct, after conference organizers ignored complaints by speaker Matt Blaze about harassment at the event, and speaker Chelsea Manning was rushed on stage by an attendee.

== Honors ==
Lean Out: The Struggle for Gender Equality in Tech and Start-up Culture was listed by Inc. Magazine as one of the 100 best business books of 2015.

In 2018, Shevinsky was named "Woman of the Decade" by her alma mater Williams College in a speech where she announced she wanted to lead the way for the development and protection of privacy for the following decade.

== Selected publications ==
- Caslin, III, Michael J.; Maller, Joseph; Shevinsky, Elissa (2013). "Linking measurement to management and compensation". In Lyons, Thomas S. (ed.). Social Entrepreneurship: How Businesses Can Transform Society. Vol. 3. Praeger.
- Shevinsky, Elissa (July 23, 2015). "Why the US government must lose cryptowars 2.0". The Christian Science Monitor; Boston, Mass. ProQuest 1698203646.
- Shevinsky, Elissa, ed. (2015). Lean Out: The Struggle for Gender Equality in Tech and Start-up Culture. OR Books.

== Film ==
Shevinsky appears in the documentaries CODE: Debugging the Gender Gap and Silenced.
