= LeanIn.Org =

Nonprofit organization

- Founded: March 2013; 13 years ago
- Founder: Sheryl Sandberg
- Type: 501(c)(3)
- Purpose: Empowering women and girls to achieve their ambitions and creating equal and inclusive workplaces
- Location: Palo Alto, California, U.S.
- Region served: Global
- Key people: Sheryl Sandberg, co-founder and board chair Tom Bernthal, board member Katie Mitic, board member Laura Cox Kaplan, board member Lori Goler, board member Kim Keating, board member Gareth Schweitzer, board member
- Website: www.leanin.org

LeanIn.Org (also known as Lean In Foundation) is a 501(c)(3) nonprofit organization founded by Sheryl Sandberg in 2013, dedicated to empowering women and girls to achieve their ambitions and to creating equal and inclusive workplaces. The organization was launched in conjunction with Sandberg's bestselling book, Lean In: Women, Work, and the Will to Lead, and has since grown into a global community with Lean In Circles in 183 countries. LeanIn.Org supports women through peer community (Lean In Circles), workplace programs, and original research. Its annual Women in the Workplace study, conducted in partnership with McKinsey & Company, is the largest study of women in corporate America and Canada, with more than 1,000 companies and 490,000 individuals participating over its eleven-year history.

The organization also runs annual campaigns on equal pay and gender bias, including #BanBossy, #LeanInTogether, and #20PercentCounts, and develops workplace bias training programs used by companies globally.

== Background and mission ==
The Lean In Foundation was formed in response to the success of Sandberg's book, Lean In: Women, Work, and the Will to Lead. The proceeds from book sales went toward funding the nonprofit.

== Circles ==
Lean In Circles are communities of peers who "meet regularly to learn and grow together." Circles were originally designed to have 8 to 12 peers who would meet monthly. Although each circle varies in location and size, all Circles provide robust networks of peer support. Circles frequently involve facilitated discussion on gender issues between both women and men. As of 2026, more than 100,000 Lean In Circles have been started by community members in 183 countries. According to LeanIn.Org, 85% of Circle members report that participation has brought about a positive change in their lives.

=== CSE ===
Lean in Computer Science and Engineering Chapter supports women studying computer science and engineering. Founded in collaboration with The Anita Borg Institute, Facebook, and Linkedin, to date, there are over 250 Circles and 6,000 members. In summer 2015, chapter members launched a "Lean IN-terns Program" for students interning at Bay Area tech companies.

=== Military ===
The Lean In Military Chapter launched in September 2015 in partnership with the Department of Defense. Within just one year, the chapter grew to over 100 circles and nearly 2000 members. This Chapter includes all branches of the military.

=== Veterans ===
On May 21, 2016, National Armed Forces Day, Lean In kicked off the launch of Veterans Circles by top influences like Michelle Obama, Sheryl Sandberg, and Senator Amy Klobuchar. The goal is to assimilate and integrate women veterans into civilian communities.

=== Partnerships ===
The Lean In Foundation Partnerships team is responsible for developing and maintaining strategic partnerships for the organizations as well as manage the Circles program. In February 2014, the nonprofit partnered with Getty Images to create the Lean In Collection, a library of more than 15,000 stock photographs depicting women and girls in empowering, non-stereotypical roles, available to media and brands seeking more representative visual content.

== Programs ==
=== Lean In Girls ===
Lean In Girls is a leadership program designed for teenage girls, available at leaningirls.org. The curriculum helps participants identify their leadership strengths, reject limiting stereotypes, and build confidence. The program provides tools for facilitators including parents, teachers, and mentors.

=== 100 Ways to Fight Bias ===
LeanIn.Org developed the 50 Ways to Fight Bias program, later expanded to 100 Ways to Fight Bias, to help employees and managers recognize and interrupt common forms of gender bias in the workplace. The program is used by companies globally and includes facilitated discussion cards, videos, and workshop guides.

=== Circles for Companies ===
The Circles for Companies program brings Lean In Circles into corporate environments, providing women with peer mentorship and leadership development within their organizations. Companies partner with LeanIn.Org to implement the program as part of their diversity, equity, and inclusion efforts.

== Women in the Workplace ==
The Women in the Workplace study is an annual report produced by LeanIn.Org in partnership with McKinsey & Company examining women's representation and day-to-day experiences in corporate America and Canada. First published in 2015, it is the largest ongoing study of its kind. Over its eleven-year history, more than 1,000 companies and approximately 490,000 individuals have participated.

The first study was conducted in 2015, building on similar McKinsey research in 2012, and surveyed more than 118 companies and 30,000 employees. It concluded that women were severely underrepresented at every level of the corporate leadership pipeline, and that this disparity was driven not by women leaving companies at higher rates, but by an uneven playing field, lack of prioritization of gender diversity, and low participation in flexibility programs due to fear of career repercussions.

The 2024 report, marking the study's tenth anniversary, analyzed data from 281 participating organizations representing over 10 million employees. It found that women held 29% of C-suite positions in 2024, up from 17% in 2015. However, the "broken rung"—the gap in promotions from individual contributor to first-level manager—persisted: for every 100 men promoted to manager, only 81 women were promoted. The report estimated that achieving full parity for all women in corporate America would take nearly 50 years at the current rate.

The 2025 report surveyed 124 organizations across the U.S. and Canada employing approximately 3 million people, as well as more than 9,500 employees and 62 HR executives. It identified a growing rollback of corporate commitments to gender diversity: only half of companies surveyed were prioritizing women's career advancement, and nearly one in six had scaled back formal sponsorship and career development programs for women. The report also found, for the first time, an "ambition gap," with women (80%) less likely than men (86%) to express a desire for promotion—a gap that closed when women received adequate career support.

== Campaigns ==
=== Ban Bossy ===
The organization partnered with Girl Scouts of the USA on a public initiative to encourage girls leadership called Ban Bossy. Beyoncé, Jennifer Garner, Condoleezza Rice, Jane Lynch, and Diane Von Furstenberg were featured in a promotional video for the project. The campaign suggested that use of the word discouraged women from achieving leadership positions––arguing that when a boy asserts himself, he is recognized as a leader, but when a girl asserts herself in the same scenario, she risks being called "bossy." The campaign included pledges to discourage use of the term through the hashtag #BanBossy, along with a website including education guides and leadership tips to ban bossy in action.

Beyoncé stated in the PSA that "girls are less interested in leadership than boys," and Lynch who explained "and that's because they worry about being called bossy." These statements were backed up by Garner who stated that "being labeled something matters." Beyoncé's closing quotation served as the basis for the campaign as she said "I'm not bossy, I'm the boss."

There was some criticism of the campaign. Joan Rivers found the movement petty, while Margot Talbot argued the campaign should have reclaimed the word instead of condemning it.

=== Lean In Together ===
In March 2015, a partnership with the NBA and WNBA was initiated to emphasize "how men benefit from equality and providing practical tips for men to do their part at home and at work."

=== #20PercentCounts ===
In April 2017, the organization launched #20PercentCounts, a national campaign on Equal Pay Day to highlight the importance of closing the gender pay gap. Working with Lean In community leaders in more than 25 U.S. cities, the organization was able to recruit hundreds of businesses to offer 20% off purchases and share information on the gender pay gap in their communities. In partnership with Funny or Die and Hulu, LeanIn.Org produced a video showing the impact of the pay gap on women's everyday lives, amassing more than 5 million views.

== Criticism ==
An early criticism of Lean In came from Sandberg's advertisements for unpaid interns in 2013.

Melissa Gira Grant in The Washington Post criticized the concept of the Lean In Circles. She was critical of the requirement to stay "positive" and that working-class women would be left out of the conversation. Some women have had trouble finding the right circle to fit their own needs and lifestyles.

Other critics claim that Lean In is designed for "financially well-off women."
