= Mach 37 =

American venture capital organization assisting startups

MACH37
- Type: Division
- Industry: Venture capital
- Founded: 2013
- Headquarters: Tysons, Virginia, United States
- Number of locations: 1 office (2020)
- Key people: Jason Chen, Jennifer Quarrie, Diego Salinas, Daniel Martin, Simon Hartley, Ed Albrigo, David Ihrie, Tom Weithman.
- Products: Investments
- Website: www.mach37.com

MACH37 is an American startup accelerator that was established in 2013 as a division of the Virginia-based Center for Innovative Technology (CIT) with funding from the Commonwealth of Virginia. In 2017 CIT partnered with VentureScope, a strategic innovation consultancy and venture firm, to revamp MACH37's operating model and curriculum. Following a successful partnership between CIT and VentureScope, MACH37 became fully owned and operated by VentureScope in 2020. MACH37 focuses primarily on honing and strengthening startups' product-market fit through extensive customer discovery and market research, expanding emerging companies' professional networks, fostering founder wellbeing, and providing emerging companies in the cybersecurity industry with access to investment capital and an immediate customer base. In an October 2020 article Forbes named MACH37 'the Granddaddy' of top cyber accelerators giving a nod to the fact that MACH37 was one of the first accelerators in the world dedicated to cyber and cyber adjacent technologies, and it has lasted far longer than many of its peer accelerators while strengthening over time. The name 'MACH37' is a reference to the escape velocity of Earth's atmosphere. VentureScope applies Lean Startup methodology at MACH37 as an efficient and successful approach to assist startups to rapidly adapt their search for a successful business model and test their hypotheses about customer needs and market demands.

== Program ==
MACH37 offers three separate accelerator programs - a pre-accelerator for those early stage startups that need to establish themselves further before enduring the rigor of a full accelerator program, a cyber accelerator that runs two 90-day cohorts of 5-8 cyber startup companies per year, and a growth stage accelerator that provides custom acceleration for more mature startups who are in the next phase of growing and scaling their businesses. MACH37 hosts their acceleration curriculum in a variety of forums to include live in-person sessions at their Tyson's office space, special in-person sessions hosted in strategic partner spaces to facilitate collaboration, virtual live online sessions, as well as asynchronous sessions on their virtual platform. Like other accelerator programs, they offer the program in exchange for equity as well as partner with investors to help participants received initial seed money investments, to include some regional economic development partners like CIT who offer investment if companies establish or relocate to Virginia.

Each MACH37 Cyber accelerator 90-day cohort is intended to be an intense period of assessment, customer discovery, clarification, design, development, outreach and growth with the ultimate goal of finding product-market fit, market traction, additional investment. Companies conclude the program by giving a presentation and answering questions in front of a panel of potential investors at a large community event known as Launch Day. In an interview with Washington Business Journal, former CIT chief Pete Jobse stated "What the accelerator is designed to do is make sure the concepts [and] the markets that appear to be interesting for these new technologies are actually there for them". During the 90-day cohorts, MACH37 hosts a variety of events to foster connection across the cyber community, both locally in Virginia, Maryland and Washington, D.C., but also globally as companies and investors participate from countries across the world. MACH37 is known for providing an important platform and community where various cyber security industry leaders can speak, share ideas, and ultimately collaborate on key problems.

MACH37 has been seen by some as an opportunity for emerging technology companies to gain access to government contracts relating to cyber security, but historically focused predominantly in the commercial sector. MACH37 was supported by Governor Terry McAuliffe, who initiated a memorandum of understanding between MACH37 and the University of Virginia's College at Wise. However, in 2016, McAuliffe also expressed a desire to transition ownership share to private corporations such as Amazon Web Services, one of MACH37's sponsors. The following year in 2017, CIT made good on that request and began to transition the program toward private ownership by VentureScope. MACH37 is currently managed by experienced entrepreneurs, VentureScope CEO Jason Chen and COO Jennifer Quarrie, who have worked globally in strategy, innovation, venture, entrepreneurship, well-being, product development, regional economic development and change management.

== History ==
MACH37 has had 78 different startup companies as participants since its founding. The program was started in early 2013 as a division of the Virginia Center for Innovative Technology (CIT) with support from Virginia's government as part of an initiative to provide new technology for the intelligence agencies of the United States as well as creating new jobs and establishing Virginia as a cyber security capital. MACH37 was previously managed by a group known as the MACH37 Partners, which consisted of founders Rick Gordon, Dan Woolley, Robert Stratton, Tom Weithman, David Ihrie, and Pete Jobse, all of whom had previously worked in the software industry. Later, Pete Jobse, President of CIT, was succeeded by Ed Albrigo.

Initially, MACH37 was sustained entirely through public funding by the Virginia state. In 2015, the aerospace\defense company General Dynamics agreed to partially fund MACH37's operating budget. This new funding from General Dynamics came at no reduction to the state budget for MACH37. This was considered the first major step of transferring control of MACH37 to the private sector.

MACH37 has operated differently than other accelerators because it looks to accept founders with extensive technical backgrounds but limited entrepreneurial experience and that have never run a company before. This has allowed participants to focus exclusively on product design and development while MACH37 aims to provide connections to financial backing that typically require additional resources and expertise from the startups. So far, 70% of MACH37 participants in 2015 and 63% in 2016 received additional funding from private investors after completing the program.

As of 2016, MACH37 has partnerships with Microsoft BizSpark, Rackspace, Virtru, and Square 1 Bank and is sponsored by Amazon Web Services, General Dynamics, and SAP SE. MACH37 also has the not-for-profit organization MITRE as a part of its network.

In July 2017, it was announced that Rick Gordon, Dan Woolley and Bob Stratton were no longer at MACH37. Tom Weithman became the President of the company, Jason Chen became the managing director of operations, and Mary Beth Borgwing became the managing director of cyber.

== See also ==
- Business incubator
