= Sheryl Sandberg =

American business executive (born 1969)

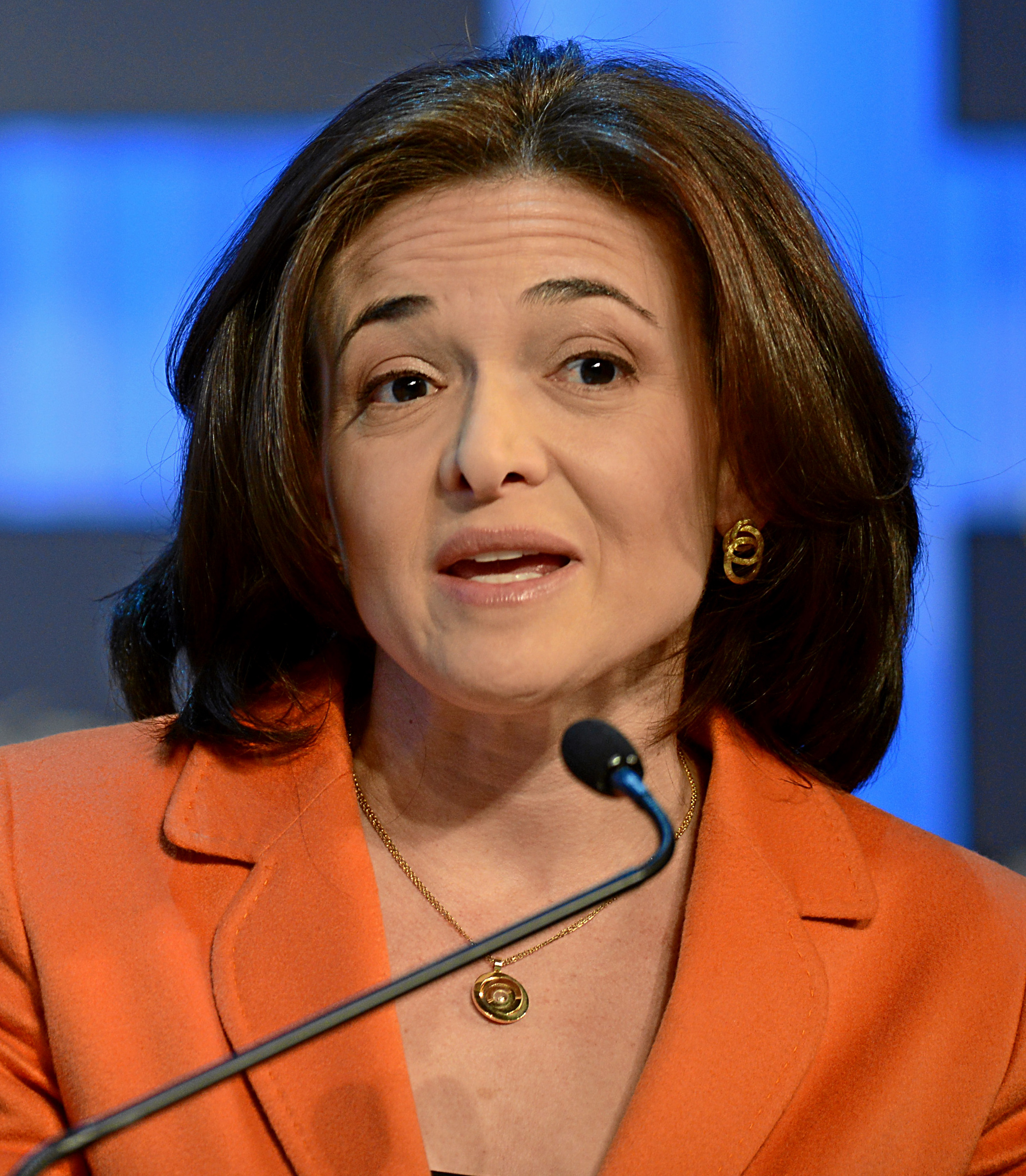
- Sandberg in 2013
- Born: Sheryl Kara Sandberg; August 28, 1969 (age 57); Washington, D.C., U.S.
- Education: Harvard University (AB, MBA)
- Occupations: Technology executive; philanthropist; writer
- Years active: 1991–2022
- Title: Chief operating officer of Meta Platforms (2008–2022)
- Political party: Democratic
- Board member of: Meta Platforms; Women for Women International; Center for Global Development; SurveyMonkey
- Spouses: Brian Kraff (m. 1993; div. 1994) Dave Goldberg (m. 2004; died 2015) Tom Bernthal (m. 2022)
- Children: 2
- Relatives: Jon Bernthal (brother-in-law)

Sheryl Kara Sandberg (born August 28, 1969) is an American technology executive, philanthropist and writer. She was the chief operating officer of Meta Platforms from 2008 to 2022 and is the founder of LeanIn.Org.

Sandberg is the first woman to have been elected to Facebook's board of directors. As head of the company's advertising business, Sandberg has been credited for making the company profitable. Prior to joining Facebook as its COO, Sandberg was vice president of global online sales and operations at Google and was involved in its philanthropic arm Google.org. Sandberg graduated from Harvard University, later serving as a research assistant to Lawrence Summers at the World Bank and subsequently his chief of staff when he became Bill Clinton's United States Secretary of the Treasury.

In 2012, she was named in the Time 100, an annual list of the most influential people in the world. On Forbes magazine's 2021 billionaires list, Sandberg is reported to have a net worth of US$1.7 billion, owing to her stock holdings in Facebook and in other companies. In 2022, she announced she would be stepping down from Meta in the fall but would remain on its board. In January 2024, she announced that she would not stand for re-election to the board in May 2024.

As of July 2025, Sandberg's net worth is estimated to be $2.4 billion according to Forbes.

As of March 2026 Sheryl Sandberg has joined the board of British AI startup Nscale.

== Early life and education ==
Sandberg was born on August 28, 1969, in Washington, D.C. into a Jewish family. She is the eldest of three children, born to Adele (née Einhorn) and Joel Sandberg. Her father is an ophthalmologist, while her mother, a college professor of French, has roots tracing back to Belarus, as her grandparents were immigrants from there.

Her family moved to North Miami Beach, Florida, when she was two years old. She attended North Miami Beach High School, from which she graduated in 1987 ranked ninth in her class. She was sophomore class president, became a member of the National Honor Society, and was on the senior class executive board. Sandberg taught aerobics in the 1980s while in high school.

In 1987, Sandberg enrolled at Harvard College. She graduated in 1991 summa cum laude and Phi Beta Kappa with a Bachelor of Arts degree in economics and was awarded the John H. Williams Prize for the top graduating student in economics. While at Harvard, she co-founded an organization called Women in Economics and Government. She also met Professor Lawrence Summers, who became her mentor and thesis adviser. Summers recruited her to be his research assistant at the World Bank, where she worked for approximately one year on health projects in India dealing with leprosy, AIDS, and blindness.

In 1993, she enrolled at Harvard Business School and in 1995 she earned her MBA degree, graduating with the highest distinction. In her first year of business school, she earned a fellowship.

== Career ==
=== Early career ===
After graduating from business school in the spring of 1995, Sandberg worked as a management consultant for McKinsey & Company for approximately one year (1995–1996). From 1996 to 2001 she again worked for Lawrence Summers, who was then serving as the United States Secretary of the Treasury under President Bill Clinton, as his chief of staff. Sandberg assisted in the Treasury's work on forgiving debt in the developing world during the Asian financial crisis.

Sandberg joined Google in 2001, where she was responsible for online sales of Google's advertising and publishing products as well as for sales operations of Google's consumer products and Google Book Search. During her time at Google, she grew the ad and sales team from four people to 4,000.

=== Facebook / Meta Platforms ===
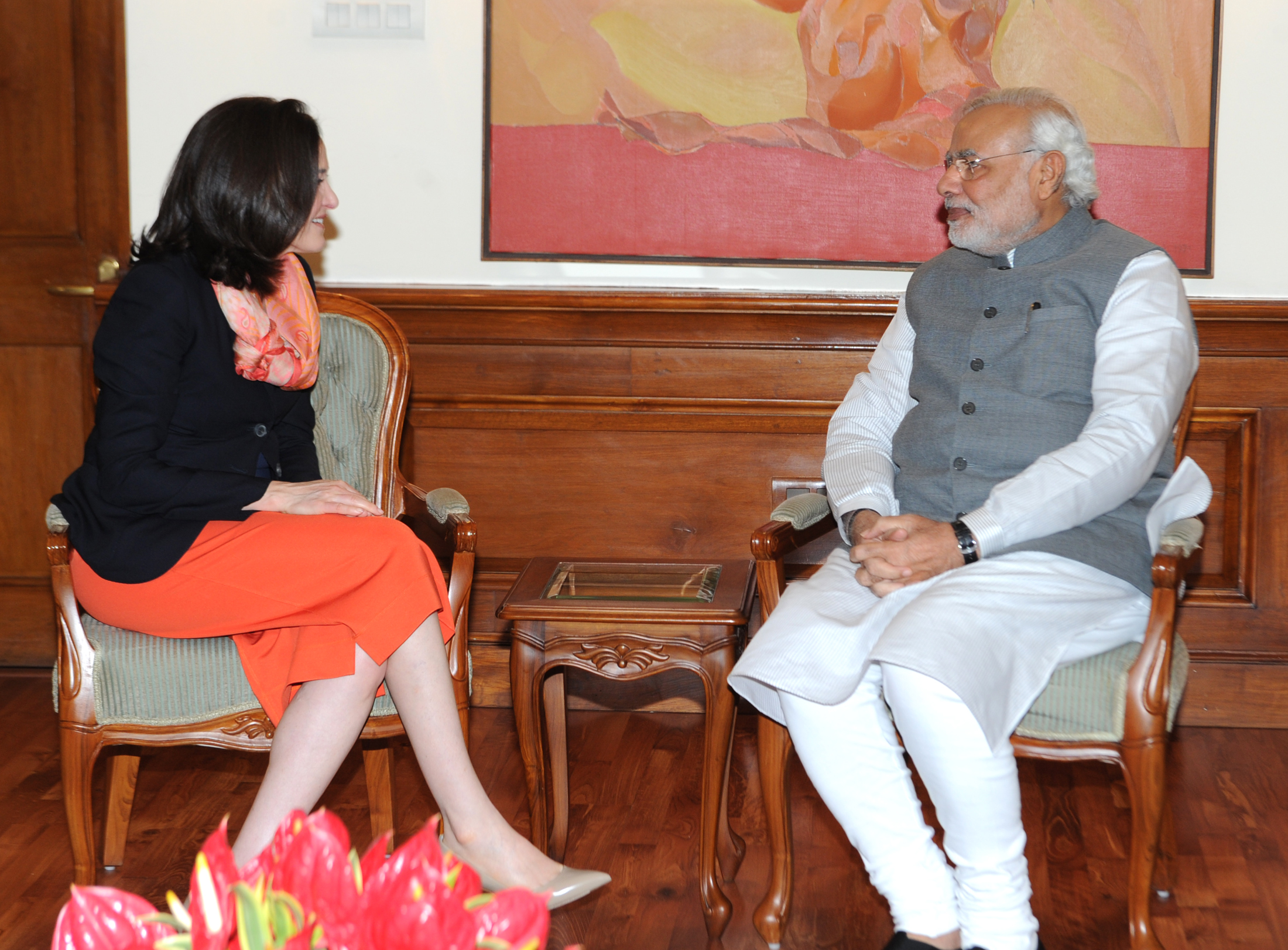
Sandberg with Indian Prime Minister Narendra Modi in New Delhi, 2014

In late 2007, Mark Zuckerberg, co-founder and chief executive of Facebook, met Sandberg at a Christmas party held by Dan Rosensweig. Zuckerberg had no formal search for a chief operating officer, but thought of Sandberg as "a perfect fit" for this role. In March 2008, Facebook announced the hiring of Sandberg for the role of COO and her leaving Google.

After joining the company, Sandberg quickly began trying to figure out how to make Facebook profitable. Before she joined, the company was "primarily interested in building a really cool site; profits, they assumed, would follow." By late spring, Facebook's leadership had agreed to rely on advertising, "with the ads discreetly presented"; by 2010, Facebook became profitable. According to Facebook, (as of 2012) she oversaw the firm's business operations including sales, marketing, business development, human resources, public policy and communications.

In 2012, she became the eighth member of Facebook's board of directors.

In April 2014, it was reported that Sandberg had sold more than half of her shares in Facebook since the company went public. At the time of Facebook's IPO, she held approximately 41 million shares in the company; by 2019, after several rounds of sales, she owned 17.2 million shares, 0.5 per cent of the company, worth about $1 billion; by 2024, she owned 0.64 million.

The New York Times published a report in 2018 detailing Sandberg's role in handling Facebook's public relations after revelations of Russian interference in the 2016 United States elections and its Cambridge Analytica data scandal. According to The Wall Street Journal, during a meeting, Zuckerberg blamed Sandberg personally for the outcome of the scandal, and that Sandberg "confided in friends that the exchange rattled her, and she wondered if she should be worried about her job."

On November 29, 2018, The New York Times reported that Sandberg had personally asked Facebook's communications staff to conduct research into George Soros's finances days after Soros publicly criticized tech companies, including Facebook, at the World Economic Forum. In a statement, Facebook said the research into Soros "was already underway when Sheryl [Sandberg] sent an email asking if Mr. Soros had shorted Facebook's stock."

On June 1, 2022, Sandberg announced she would be leaving Meta as COO in the fall of 2022 but would remain on the board of directors. Stating a reason for stepping down, Sandberg stated "it is time for me to write the next chapter of my life." In January 2024, she announced that she would be stepping down from the board in May and not running for re-election.

In January 2025, vice chancellor of the Delaware Chancery Court J. Travis Laster imposed sanctions on Sandberg for deleting emails from her personal account related to the Cambridge Analytica privacy scandal. These emails were relevant to the 2018 shareholder lawsuit, and deleting them violated a litigation hold.

=== Board roles ===
In 2009, Sandberg was named to the board of The Walt Disney Company. She also serves on the boards of Women for Women International, the Center for Global Development, and V-Day. She was previously a board member of Meta, Starbucks, Brookings Institution, and Ad Council.

=== Sandberg Bernthal Venture Partners ===
In 2021, Sandberg and her husband, Tom Bernthal, launched Sandberg Bernthal Venture Partners to invest their own capital in start-ups.

In November 2023, Sandberg's investment company invested in Cercle, an AI healthcare business.

In April 2024, she invested in Pigment SAS, a French software company, as part of a $145 million round.

== Other work and ventures ==
Sandberg gives UC Berkeley Commencement Keynote Speech in 2016

In 2008, Sandberg wrote an article for The Huffington Post in support of her mentor, Larry Summers, who was under fire for his comments about women. She was a keynote speaker at the Jewish Community Federation's Business Leadership Council in 2010. In December 2010, she gave a TED speech titled "Why we have too few women leaders." In May 2011, she gave the Commencement Address at the Barnard College graduation ceremony. She spoke as the keynote speaker at the Class Day ceremony at the Harvard Business School in May 2012. In April 2013, she was the keynote speaker during the second annual Entrepreneur Weekend at Colgate University, in Hamilton, New York. In 2015, she signed an open letter which the ONE Campaign had been collecting signatures for; the letter was addressed to Angela Merkel and Nkosazana Dlamini-Zuma, urging them to focus on women as they serve as the head of the G7 in Germany and the AU in South Africa respectively, which will start to set the priorities in development funding before a main UN summit in September 2015 that will establish new development goals for the generation. In 2016, she delivered the Commencement Address at the University of California, Berkeley graduation ceremony. It was the first time she spoke publicly about her husband's death, and stressed the importance of resilience. The following year she delivered the Commencement Address to Virginia Tech's Class of 2017. On June 8, 2018, she gave the Commencement Address for the Massachusetts Institute of Technology in Cambridge, MA. She has also served as a member of the advisory board of the Peter G. Peterson Foundation.

=== Lean In ===
Sandberg released her first book, Lean In: Women, Work, and the Will to Lead, co-authored by Nell Scovell and published by Knopf on March 11, 2013.

The book concerns business leadership and development, issues with the lack of women in government and business leadership positions, and feminism. As of the fall of 2013, the book had sold more than one million copies and was on top of the bestseller lists since its launch.

The book has been reviewed by various media outlets. In Lean Out, former Facebook employee Marissa Orr affirms that women should not have to mimic men and that society needs to change to adapt to women's issues instead. The book has also been criticized by Vox Media for overlooking the struggles of mothers who may not be able to "lean in." Zoe Williams in The Guardian referred to Lean In as "an infantilising, reactionary guide for ambitious women." She emphasizes Sandberg's contradictory approach in both criticizing and upholding misogynistic workplace practices. Sandberg has been denounced by The Guardian as a COO who avoids engaging in this leadership crisis.

Furthermore, following the Facebook–Cambridge Analytica data scandal, Sandberg's willingness to actually lean in was questioned by Roger McNamee. "She's not leaning in at all," McNamee said, in a reference to Sandberg's widely read book published five years before. "If ever there was a time for her to lean in, this is it."

=== Option B ===
Sandberg released her second book, Option B, in April 2017. Option B is co-authored with Adam Grant, a professor at the Wharton School of the University of Pennsylvania. The book puts emphasis on grief and resilience in challenges within life. It offers practical tips for creating resilience in the family and community. 2.75 million copies have been sold since publication.

=== Ban Bossy ===
In March 2014, Sandberg and Lean In sponsored the Ban Bossy campaign, a television and social media campaign designed to discourage the word bossy from general use owing to its perceived harmful effect on young girls. Several video spots with spokespersons including Beyoncé, Jennifer Garner, and Condoleezza Rice among others were produced along with a web site providing school training material, leadership tips, and an online pledge form to which visitors can promise not to use the word.

=== Screams Before Silence ===
In April 2024, Screams Before Silence, a documentary fronted by Sandberg, was released to YouTube. The film concerns the reported sexual violence committed by Hamas on the October 7th attack on Israel. She has described this film as the most important work of her life. In a speech at the Jewish Federations of North America’s annual General Assembly, Sandberg declared herself to be a "proud Zionist."

== Philanthropy ==
In November 2016, Sandberg renamed her Lean In Foundation to the Sheryl Sandberg & Dave Goldberg Family Foundation, after herself and her late husband. This new foundation serves as an umbrella for LeanIn.Org and a new organization around her book Option B. Sandberg also transferred roughly $100,000,000 in Facebook stock to fund the foundation and other charitable endeavors.

In October 2024, Sandberg donated $5 million through her charitable foundation to Marshall University for its 'Marshall For All' program.

== Personal life ==
Sandberg married Brian Kraff in 1993 and divorced a year later. In 2004, she married Dave Goldberg, then an executive with Yahoo! and later CEO of SurveyMonkey. The couple had a son and a daughter. Sandberg and Goldberg frequently discussed being in a shared earning/shared parenting marriage. Sandberg also raised the issue of single parenting conflicting strongly with professional and economic development in America.

On May 1, 2015, Dave Goldberg died unexpectedly, and his death was originally reported as resulting from sustaining a head trauma falling from a treadmill while the couple was vacationing in Mexico. However, an autopsy later suggested that the cause of death was an arrhythmia, as Sandberg subsequently confirmed in an interview.

Sandberg dated Activision Blizzard CEO Bobby Kotick from 2016 to 2019. According to an April 21, 2022, report by The Wall Street Journal, Sandberg was part of a coordinated campaign to prevent the Daily Mail from publishing a story about a temporary restraining order towards Kotick by a former girlfriend in 2014. (Note: At the time of The Journal's report, Kotick's company was facing lawsuits over allegations of widespread sexual misconduct, which Kotick himself was alleged to have participated in.) These campaigns occurred first in 2016 (when Sandberg and Kotick began dating), and again in 2019 (the year they separated). The Journal stated that Facebook was reviewing whether Sandberg violated the company's rules.

On February 3, 2020, she announced her engagement on Facebook to Kelton Global CEO Tom Bernthal. They were married in August 2022. Bernthal has three children and Sandberg has two, and they live together in Menlo Park, California.

=== Politics ===
Sandberg supported Hillary Clinton in the 2016 presidential election. She declined to endorse Elizabeth Warren, an outspoken critic of Facebook, multiple times throughout the 2020 Democratic Party presidential primaries, though she stated, "I imagine I will support a Democratic nominee" over incumbent Donald Trump. Sandberg endorsed Kamala Harris for president in 2024. She was part of a WhatsApp thread "Builders for Israel" which co-ordinated on building support for Israel.

=== Allegations of sexual harassment ===
Former Facebook employee Sarah Wynn-Williams's 2025 memoir Careless People: A Cautionary Tale of Power, Greed, and Lost Idealism alleges that on at least two occasions, Sandberg requested that young female staffers, including Wynn-Williams, "come to bed" with her. These requests were allegedly made by Sandberg while traveling on Facebook's private jet, where she had a private bedroom. Other employees present at the time said that Sandberg was merely offering Wynn-Williams a place to sleep during travel, as she was visibly pregnant, and the plane had multiple beds.

The first instance of the request is documented by Wynn-Williams in the chapter "Lean in and Lie Back", where Sandberg allegedly pressures Wynn-Williams to join her in bed. In Wynn-Williams's account, Sandberg admits that she has previously requested this of other young, female colleagues, particularly one named Sadie, noting that "Sadie's slept over lots of times". Wynn-Williams was able to avoid joining Sandberg in her private room in this instance and a second instance documented in a later chapter, "Let Them Eat Cake". Wynn-Williams also alleges that Sandberg invited Sadie, her assistant, to come to her house to try on expensive lingerie purchased with Sandberg’s money, and to stay over.

Several former and current Meta employees have stated publicly that “a bunch of the stories are exaggerated or just didn't happen” and that Wynn-Williams’ book was “dishonest and distorted.”

== Honors ==
External videos
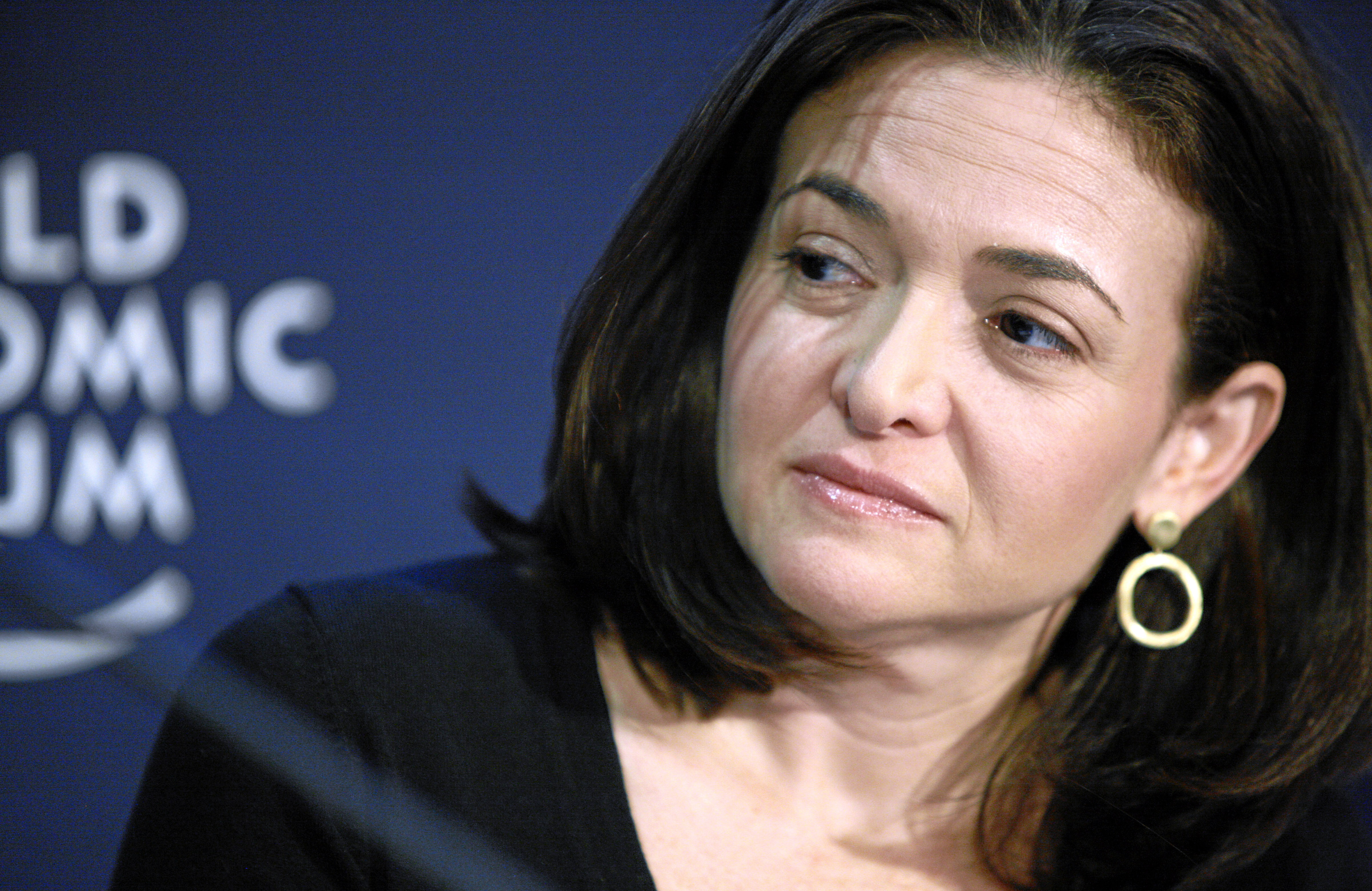
- Sheryl Sandberg: Why we have too few women leaders, TED
- Barnard College Commencement Speech, Barnard College

- Sandberg has been ranked one of the 50 "Most Powerful Women in Business" by Fortune Magazine:
  - In 2007 she was ranked No. 29 and was the youngest woman on the list.
  - In 2008 she was ranked No. 34.
  - In 2009 she was ranked No. 22.
  - In 2010 she was ranked No. 16.
  - In 2014 she was ranked No. 10.
  - In 2016 she was ranked No. 6.
  - In 2017 she was ranked No. 5.
  - In 2018 she was ranked No. 6.
- On the list of 50 "Women to Watch" by The Wall Street Journal.
  - She was ranked No. 19 on that list in 2007.
  - She was ranked No. 21 on that list in 2008.
- Sandberg was named one of the "25 Most Influential People on the Web" by Business Week in 2009.
- She has been listed as one of the world's 100 most powerful women by Forbes. In 2014, Sandberg was No. 9, just behind Michelle Obama, No. 4 in 2017, and No. 36 in 2021.
- In 2012, Newsweek and The Daily Beast released their first "Digital Power Index", a list of the 100 most significant people in the digital world that year (plus 10 additional "Lifetime Achievement" winners), and she was ranked No. 3 in the "Evangelists" category.
- In 2012, she was named in Time 100, an annual list of the 100 most influential people in the world assembled by Time.
- Lean In was shortlisted for the Financial Times and Goldman Sachs Business Book of the Year Award (2013).
- In 2013, she was ranked Time No. 8 on "The World's 50 Most Influential Jews" conducted by The Jerusalem Post.

== Books ==
- Lean In: Women, Work, and the Will to Lead. Knopf. 2013. ISBN 978-0385349949
- Written with Adam Grant: Option B: Facing Adversity, Building Resilience and Finding Joy. Knopf. 2017. ISBN 978-1524732684

== Notes ==
Business positions
Preceded by Owen Van Natta	Chief Operating Officer of Meta Platforms; 2008–2022	Succeeded by Javier Olivan
