= Technical aspects of urban planning =

Technical aspects of urban planning involve the technical processes, considerations and features that are involved in planning for land use, urban design, natural resources, transportation, and infrastructure.

== Aesthetics ==
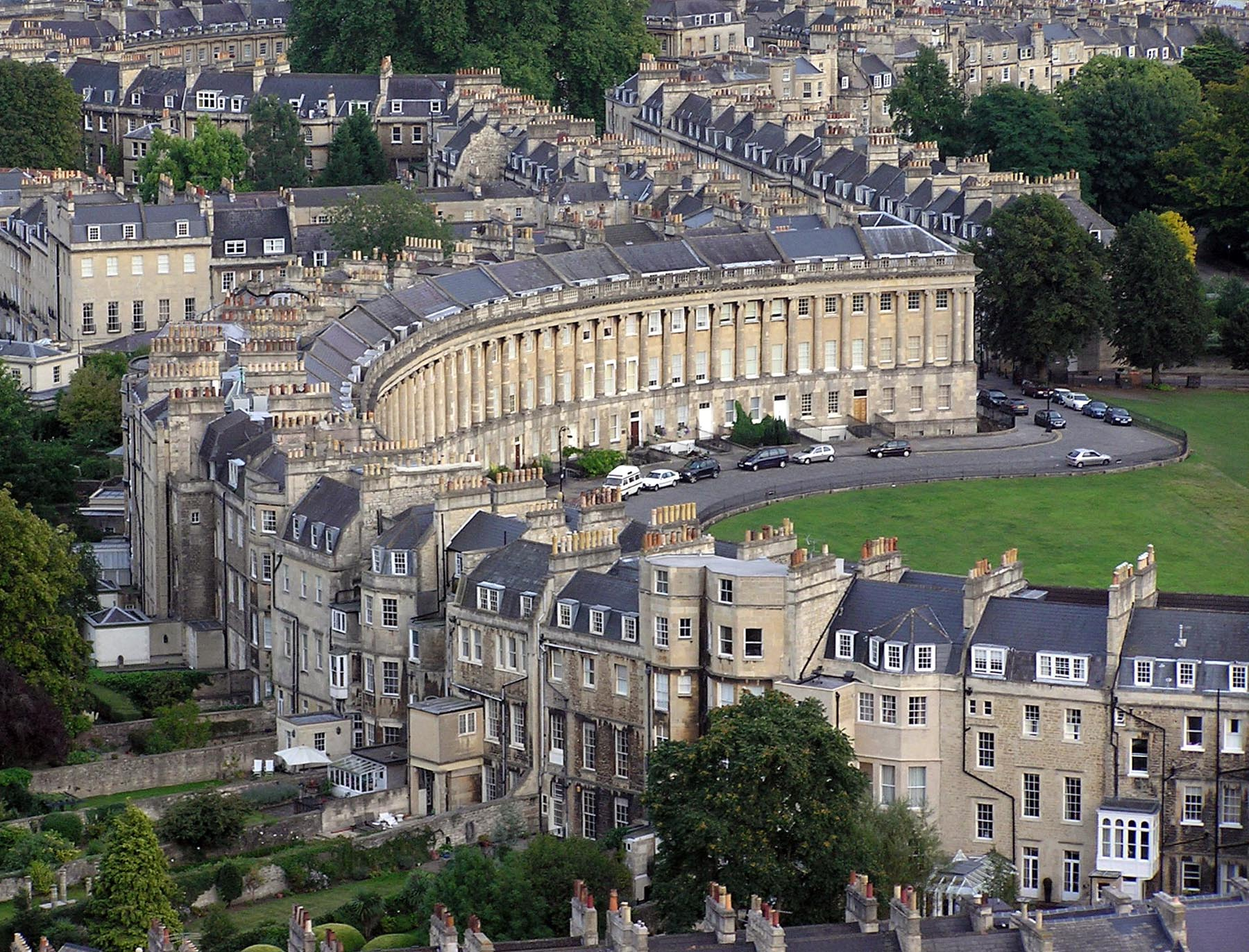
Towns and cities have been planned with aesthetics in mind. Here in Bath, England, 18th-century private sector development was designed to appear attractive

In developed countries, there has been a backlash against excessive human-made clutter in the visual environment, such as signposts, signs, and hoardings. Other issues that generate strong debate among urban designers are tensions between peripheral growth, housing density and new settlements. There are also debates about the mixing tenures and land uses, versus distinguishing geographic zones where different uses dominate. Regardless, all successful urban planning considers urban character, local identity, respects heritage, pedestrians, traffic, utilities and natural hazards.

Planners can help manage the growth of cities, applying tools like zoning and growth management to manage the uses of land. According to urban scholar Marco Romano, the beauty of historical cities such as Venice, Amsterdam and Bruges emerged over centuries from the individual building decisions of many households, operating within an institutional framework of customs, social norms and legally binding codes that produced an overall sense of harmony. Many conventional planning techniques are now described using the contemporary term smart growth.

There are some cities that have been planned from conception, and while the results often do not turn out quite as planned, evidence of the initial plan often remains. (See List of planned cities)

The 20th and 21st century trend for New Classical Architecture seeks to develop aesthetically pleasing smart growth in urban areas and to continue architectural tradition and classical design.

== Safety and security ==
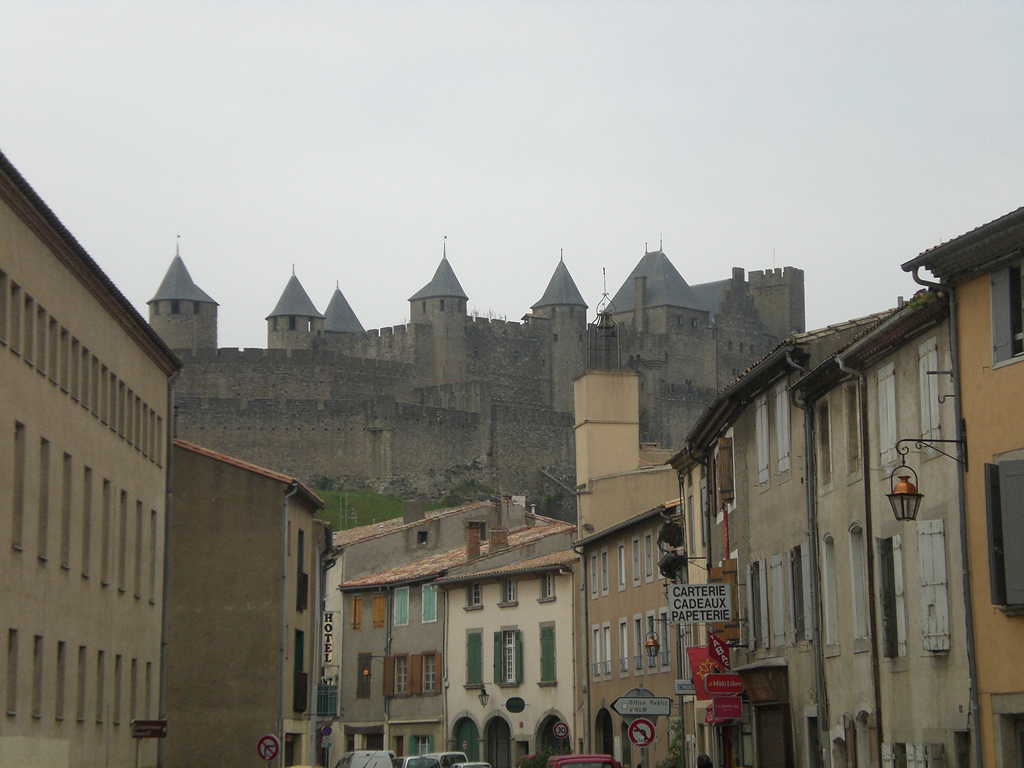
The medieval walled city of Carcassonne in France is built upon high ground to provide maximum protection from attackers.

Historically within the Middle East, Europe and the rest of the Old World, settlements were located on higher ground (for defense) and close to fresh water sources. Cities have often grown onto coastal and flood plains at risk of floods and storm surges. Urban planners must consider these threats. If the dangers can be localised then the affected regions can be made into parkland or green belt, often with the added benefit of open space provision.

Extreme weather, flood, or other emergencies can often be greatly mitigated with secure emergency evacuation routes and emergency operations centres. These are relatively inexpensive and unintrusive, and many consider them a reasonable precaution for any urban space. Many cities will also have planned, built safety features, such as levees, retaining walls, and shelters.

In recent years, practitioners have also been expected to maximise the accessibility of an area to people with different abilities, practicing the notion of "inclusive design," to anticipate criminal behaviour and consequently to "design-out crime" and to consider "traffic calming" or "pedestrianisation" as ways of making urban life more pleasant.

Some city planners try to control criminality with structures designed from theories such as socio-architecture or architectural determinism a subset of environmental determinism. These theories say that an urban environment can influence individuals' obedience to social rules and level of power. Refer to Foucault and the Encyclopaedia of the Prison System for more details. The theories often say that psychological pressure develops in more densely developed, unadorned areas. This stress causes some crimes and some use of illegal drugs. The antidote is believed to be more individual space and better, more beautiful design in place of functionalism.

Oscar Newman's defensible space theory cites the modernist housing projects of the 1960s as an example of environmental determinism, where large blocks of flats are surrounded by shared and disassociated public areas, which are hard for residents to identify with. As those on lower incomes cannot hire others to maintain public space such as security guards or grounds keepers, and because no individual feels personally responsible, there was a general deterioration of public space leading to a sense of alienation and social disorder.

Jane Jacobs is another notable environmental determinist and is associated with the "eyes on the street" concept. By improving ‘natural surveillance’ of shared land and facilities of nearby residents by literally increasing the number of people who can see it, and increasing the familiarity of residents, as a collective, residents can more easily detect undesirable or criminal behaviour, as, she argued, used to be the case in small traditional communities.

Jacobs went further, though, in emphasising the details in how to achieve this 'natural surveillance', in stressing the necessity of multiple uses on city streets, so that different people co-mingle with different stores and parks in a condensed part of city space. By doing this, as well as by making city streets interesting, she theorised a continuous animation of social actions during an average city day, which would keep city streets interesting and well occupied throughout a 24-hour period. She presented the North End in Boston, Massachusetts, as an idealisation of this persistent occupation and tasking in a condensed city space, as a model for criminal control.

The "broken-windows" theory argues that small indicators of neglect, such as broken windows and unkempt lawns, promote a feeling that an area is in a state of decay. Anticipating decay, people likewise fail to maintain their own properties. The theory suggests that abandonment causes crime, rather than crime causing abandonment.

Some planning methods might help an elite group to control ordinary citizens. Haussmann's renovation of Paris created a system of wide boulevards which prevented the construction of barricades in the streets and eased the movement of military troops. In Rome, the Fascists in the 1930s created ex novo many new suburbs in order to concentrate criminals and poorer classes away from the elegant town.

== Decay ==
Urban decay is a process by which a city, or a part of a city, falls into a state of disrepair and neglect. It is characterised by depopulation, economic restructuring, property abandonment, high unemployment, fragmented families, political disenfranchisement, crime, and desolate urban landscapes.

During the 1970s and 1980s, urban decay was often associated with central areas of cities in North America and Europe. During this time, changes in global economies, demographics, transportation, and policies fostered urban decay. Many planners spoke of "white flight" during this time. This pattern was different from the pattern of "outlying slums" and "suburban ghettos" found in many cities outside of North America and Western Europe, where central urban areas actually had higher real estate values.

Starting in the 1990s, many of the central urban areas in North America have been experiencing a reversal of the urban decay, with rising real estate values, smarter development, demolition of obsolete social housing and a wider variety of housing choices. However, reversal of urban decay (gentrification) often causes housing affordability in the inner city to decrease, with the consequence that poorer residents are pushed out, often to older inner and middle ring suburbs. This "suburbanisation of poverty" has important implications for siting affordable housing, and transportation and social services planning.

=== Slums ===
The rapid urbanisation of the last century caused more slums in the major cities of the world, particularly in developing countries. Planning resources and strategies are needed to address the problems of slum development. Many planners are calling for slum improvement, particularly the Commonwealth Association of Planners. When urban planners work on slums, they must cope with racial and cultural differences to ensure that racial steering does not occur.

Slums were often "fixed" by clearance. However, more creative solutions are beginning to emerge such as Nairobi's "Camp of Fire" program, where established slum-dwellers promise to build proper houses, schools, and community centres without government money, in return for land on which they have been illegally squatting on for 30 years. The "Camp of Fire" program is one of many similar projects initiated by Slum Dwellers International, which has programs in Africa, Asia, and South America.

== Reconstruction and renewal ==
Areas devastated by war or invasion challenge urban planners. Resources are scarce. The existing population has needs. Buildings, roads, services and basic infrastructure like power, water and sewerage are often damaged, but with salvageable parts. Historic, religious or social centres also need to be preserved and re-integrated into the new city plan. A prime example of this is the capital city of Kabul, Afghanistan, which, after decades of civil war and occupation, has regions of rubble and desolation. Despite this, the indigenous population continues to live in the area, constructing makeshift homes and shops out of salvaged materials. Any reconstruction plan, such as Hisham Ashkouri's City of Light Development, needs to be sensitive to the needs of this community and its existing culture and businesses.

Urban reconstruction development plans must also work with government agencies as well as private interests to develop workable designs.

== New master-planned cities ==
In the 21st century, countries in Asia and the Middle East have embarked on plans to build brand new large cities. Masdar City, a new city in the UAE, cost $18 billion.

One expert has said building a brand new city for 1 million people would be regarded as a "terrifying concept" in the United Kingdom while in Asia brand new large cities are being built.

Many of these new cities are built to use new technologies such as District cooling and automatic waste collection in GIFT City or Personal Rapid Transit in Masdar City.

Saudi Arabia is building 5 new cities to control congestion and sprawl in existing cities. While India is building 7 new cities to provide space and facilities that are missing in existing cities, such as cycling paths, parks and public transport within a 10-minute walk to every office and home.

== Transport ==
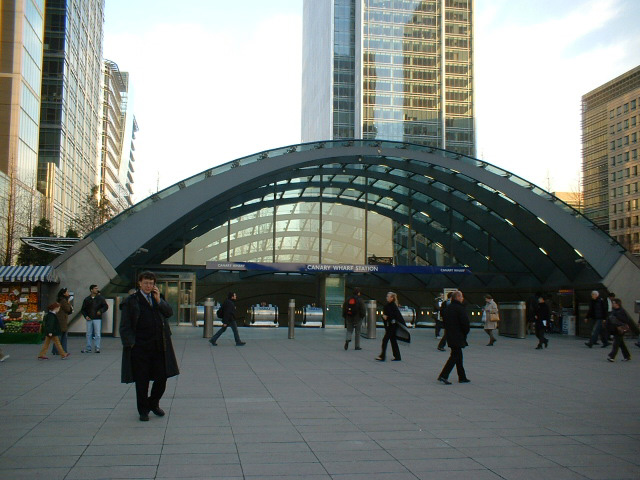
Very densely built-up areas require high capacity urban transit, and urban planners must consider these factors in long-term plans (Canary Wharf tube station)

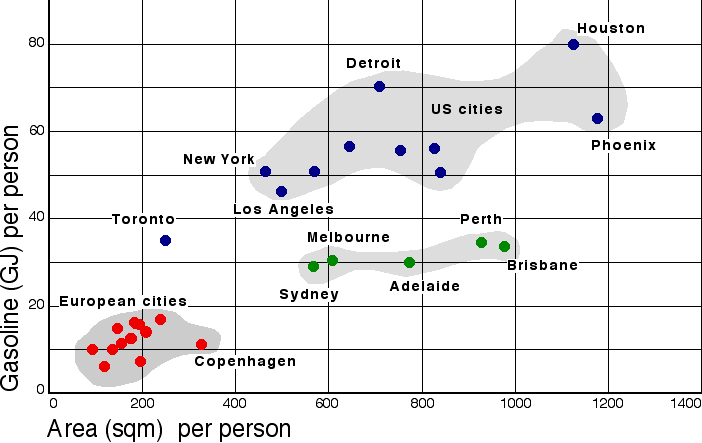
Although an important factor, there is a complex relationship between urban densities and car use

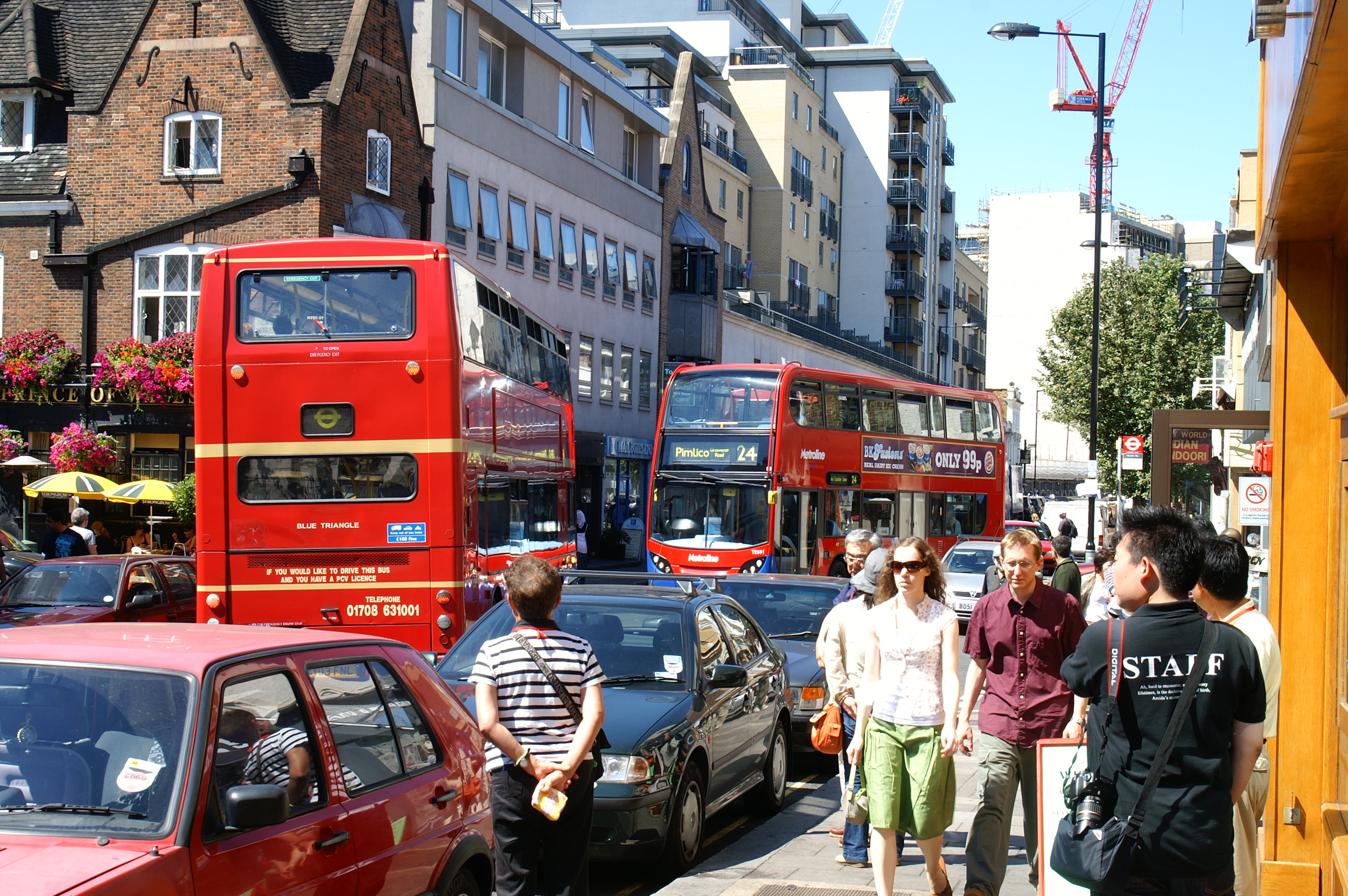
Wilton Road, Pimlico, London showing two-way traffic on a single roadway

Transport within urbanised areas presents unique problems. The density of an urban environment increases traffic, which can harm businesses and increase pollution unless properly managed. Parking space for private vehicles requires the construction of large parking garages in high density areas. This space could often be more valuable for other development.

Good planning uses transit oriented development, which attempts to place higher densities of jobs or residents near high-volume transportation. For example, some cities permit commerce and multi-story apartment buildings only within one block of train stations and multilane boulevards, and accept single-family dwellings and parks farther away.

Floor area ratio is often used to measure density. This is the floor area of buildings divided by the land area. Ratios below 1.5 are low density. Ratios above five constitute very high density. Most exurbs are below two, while most city centres are well above five. Walk-up apartments with basement garages can easily achieve a density of three. Skyscrapers easily achieve densities of thirty or more.

City authorities may try to encourage higher densities to reduce per-capita infrastructure costs. In the UK, recent years have seen a concerted effort to increase the density of residential development in order to better achieve sustainable development. Increasing development density has the advantage of making mass transport systems, district heating and other community facilities (schools, health centres, etc.) more viable.

Problems can often occur at residential densities between about two and five. These densities can cause traffic jams for automobiles, yet are too low to be commercially served by trains or light rail systems. The conventional solution is to use buses, but these and light rail systems may fail where automobiles and excess road network capacity are both available, achieving less than 2% ridership.

The Lewis–Mogridge Position claims that increasing road space is not an effective way of relieving traffic jams as latent or induced demand invariably emerges to restore a socially tolerable level of congestion.

== Suburbanisation ==
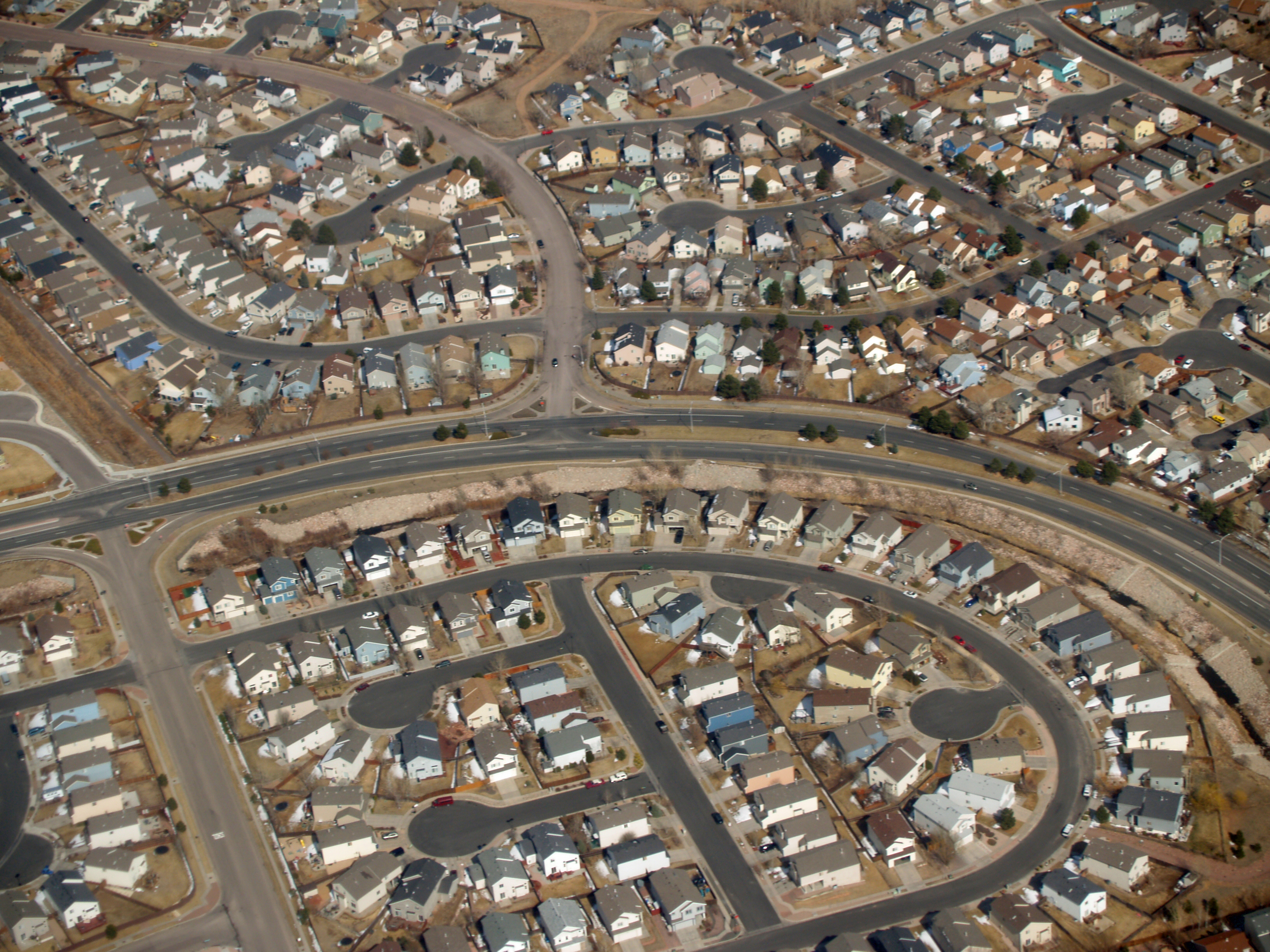
Low-density (auto-oriented) suburban development near Colorado Springs, Colorado, United States

In some countries, declining satisfaction with the urban environment is held to blame for continuing migration to smaller towns and rural areas (so-called urban exodus). Successful urban planning supported Regional planning can bring benefits to a much larger hinterland or city region and help to reduce both congestion along transport routes and the wastage of energy implied by excessive commuting.

== Environmental factors ==
Environmental protection and conservation are of utmost importance to many planning systems across the world. Not only are the specific effects of development to be mitigated, but attempts are made to minimise the overall effect of development on the local and global environment. This is commonly done through the assessment of Sustainable urban infrastructure and microclimate.

== Zoning ==
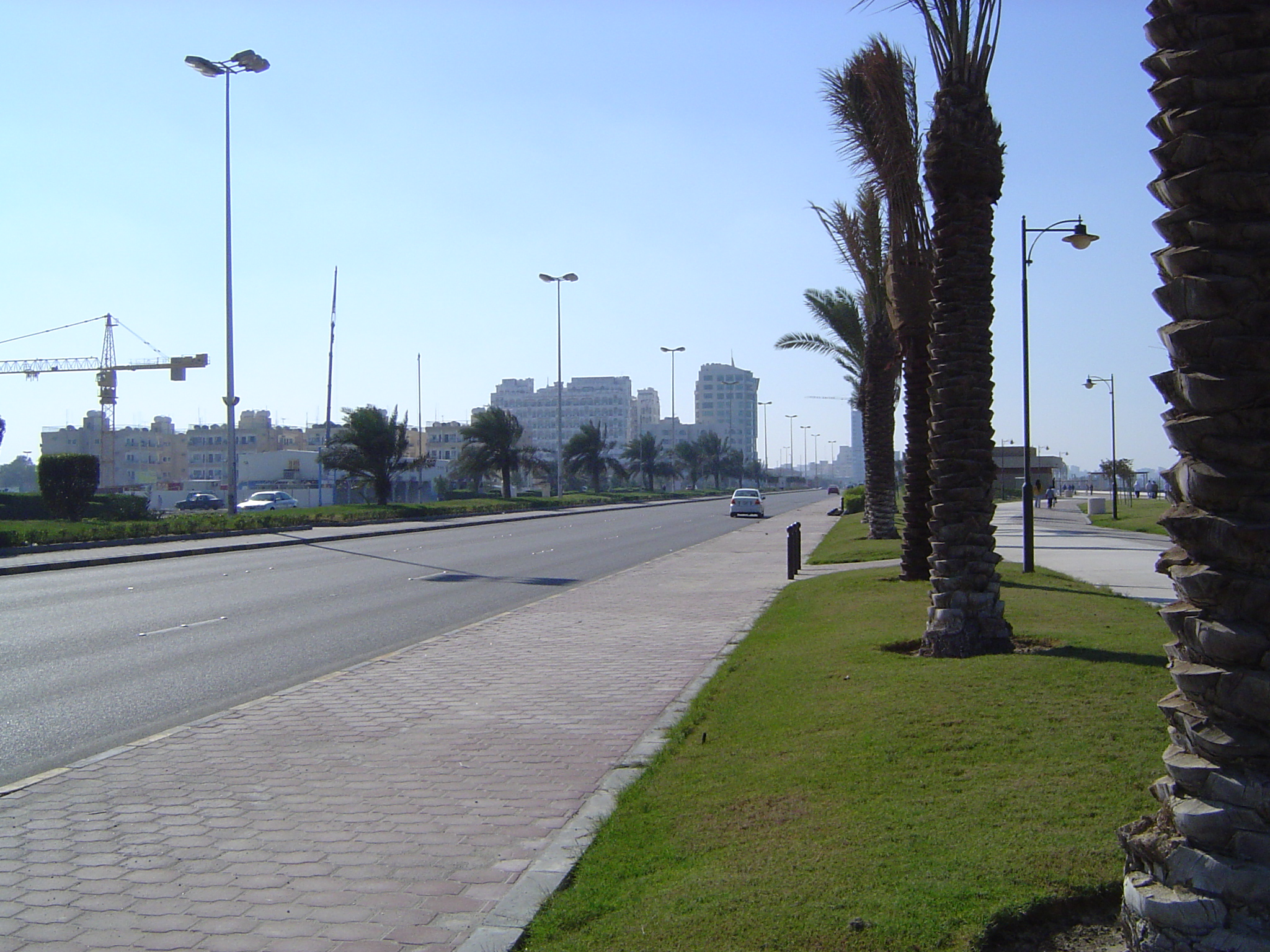
Roads in Kuwait. Traffic in Kuwait is divided into separate roads, one serving each direction.

The primary purpose of zoning is to segregate uses that are thought to be incompatible. In practice, zoning is used to prevent new development from interfering with existing residents or businesses and to preserve the "character" of a community. Zoning is commonly controlled by local governments such as counties or municipalities, though the nature of the zoning regime may be determined or limited by state or national planning authorities or through enabling legislation. In Australia, land under the control of the Commonwealth (federal) government is not subject to state planning controls. The United States and other federal countries are similar. Zoning and urban planning in France and Germany are regulated by national or federal codes. In the case of Germany this code includes contents of zoning plans as well as the legal procedure.

Zoning may include regulation of the kinds of activities which will be acceptable on particular lots (such as open space, residential, agricultural, commercial or industrial), the densities at which those activities can be performed (from low-density housing such as single family homes to high-density such as high-rise apartment buildings), the height of building process is known as a Sustainability Appraisal.

== Light and sound ==
The urban canyon effect is a colloquial, non-scientific term referring to street space bordered by very high buildings. This type of environment may shade the sidewalk level from direct sunlight during most daylight hours. While an oft-decried phenomenon, it is rare except in very dense, hyper-tall urban environments, such as those found in Lower and Midtown Manhattan, Chicago's Loop and Hong Kong's Kowloon and Central.

In urban planning, sound is usually measured as a source of pollution. Another perspective on urban sounds is developed in Soundscape studies emphasising that sound aesthetics involves more than noise abatement and decibel measurements. Hedfors coined 'Sonotope' as a useful concept in urban planning to relate typical sounds to a specific place.

Light pollution has become a problem in urban residential areas, not only as it relates to its effects on the night sky, but as some lighting is so intrusive as to cause conflict in the residential areas and paradoxically intense improperly installed security lighting may pose a danger to the public, producing excessive glare. The development of the full cutoff fixture, properly installed, has reduced this problem considerably.

== Water and sanitation infrastructure ==
=== Access and health impacts ===
Water and sanitation services are key considerations in the planning of cities. This encompasses water provision, waste-water treatment, and sewage infrastructure. These services are crucial for public health – thus, one aspect of urban planning is to consider how to best provide these services to urban residents in effective and cost-sensitive ways.

Within urban environments, there are a number of disparities with regards to access to these services. For example, as of 2006, among the poorest quartile of the urban population in India, over 80% lacked access to piped water at home and over half did not have sanitary flushes or pit toilets. Data collected in 2005–2006 revealed that under half of the urban poor could access adequate sanitation compared to about 95% of the urban non-poor. In India, slums compose a major part of the urban environment – one of the largest barriers to improving slum conditions is that many slums go undocumented. Because most slums are informal settlements with no tenure rights, their illegal status excludes them from official listings and thus excludes them from access to municipal water and sanitation services.

Economic status is highly correlated to water and sanitation service access in urban environments. But economic status is often tied to other demographic characteristics such as caste, ethnicity, and race. Therefore, access to water and sanitation services is an equity issue that faces urban planners working for urban governments. In the absence of policy to address these infrastructural disparities, the urban poor and minorities suffer disproportionately. A study of the social determinants of children's health in urban settings in India looked at data from India's National Family Health Survey and found that even within poor urban areas, caste status, religion, and sex are major factors which determine family employment and education level, factors which in turn affect access to sanitation and water.

Water and sanitation issues relate directly to health outcomes due to the susceptibility to disease experienced by populations that lack adequate access. In the 19th and 20th centuries, diseases like cholera were particularly feared due to their devastating effects and due to their proliferation in areas with poor waste management practices. Today diseases such as dengue fever, Hepatitis A, and intestinal parasites, are all examples of water-borne illnesses that affect the urban poor. Diarrheal illnesses are perhaps today the leading type of waterborne disease with cities like Jakarta experiencing disease rates as high as 50 cases per 1000 people. In India, waterborne disease accounts for the loss of roughly 180 million person-workdays annually, the economic equivalent of approximately 12 billion rupees. Thus inadequate access to water and sanitation among the urban poor and socially disadvantaged leads to systematic vulnerability to disease, which has both public health and economic consequences.

In Uganda, in order to address some of these access issues, NGOs and community-based organisations (CBOs) have stepped in. The government in Uganda has acknowledged the role of sanitation in improving public health among the poor, but as NGOs and CBOs have pointed out, the government has been unable to adequately address the need for these services in urban environments or the high cost of procuring these services from private service providers. However, NGOs and CBOs are inherently limited in their ability to provide sanitation services due to the need to obtain permissions for undertaking infrastructure projects and due to the high costs of implementing them.

=== Latrines ===
One aspect of sanitation infrastructure that is a major determinant of environmental health in slums is the latrine. There are a number of variables surrounding latrines and sewage which can play a critical role in determining health outcomes for urban families, including latrine location (in house versus out of house), latrine usage (family vs community), and latrine type (for example pit latrine versus toilet). Furthermore, the latrine is a critical aspect of urban household-level layouts and designs.

=== Waste-water ===
Waste-water collection and treatment has always been an important consideration in urban planning, but it is becoming increasingly critical as urban population levels rise and water conservation becomes a growing concern. Many planners are now considering how to properly incorporate waste-water treatment into urban environments in effective, and equitable ways.

In the US, prior to the 19th century, cities often used a de-centralised privy vault-cesspool model for waste management. Urban households had vaults or tubs beneath their latrines, which would collect waste-water until the vaults needed to be emptied into a nearby cesspool. This model worked at the time due to relatively low urban populations. However, industrialisation, urbanisation, and population growth during the 19th century led to a dramatic increase in America's city-dwelling population and thus increased the need for a centralised waste-water collection and processing system. With the introduction of piped water, such a centralised system became possible as larger quantities of water were necessary for water-carriage waste removal. Since the 19th century, water-carriage sewage management has been preferred by planners due to its scalability.

However, more recently, de-centralised waste water management has made a resurgence among planners and researchers. While centralised water-carriage systems have more potential for scalability, de-centralised systems are simply more efficient because the waste-water is managed closer to where it is generated, thus allowing for each management system to be adapted to the local community/household needs.

== See also ==
- Planning permission
- CityEngine - 3D city modeling software
