= Fraley =

Fraley may refer to:

- Fraley (surname)
- Fraley Island, Nunavut
- Fraley v. Facebook, Inc., a California class action lawsuit alleging misappropriation of Facebook users' names and likenesses in advertisements
- Fraley syndrome, dilation of a portion of the upper renal calyx due to compression by the upper branch of the renal artery
