= Lawsuits involving Meta Platforms =

Meta Platforms, Inc. has been involved in many lawsuits since its founding in 2004. Examples include:

- Young v. Facebook, Inc. (2011)
- Fraley v. Facebook, Inc. (2016)
- Force v. Facebook, Inc. (2019)
- FTC v. Meta Platforms (ongoing)

== 2000s ==
Date	Name	Description
September 2004	ConnectU.com lawsuit	Main article: ConnectU Divya Narendra, Cameron Winklevoss, and Tyler Winklevoss, founders of the social network ConnectU, filed a lawsuit against Facebook in September 2004. The lawsuit alleged that Zuckerberg had broken an oral contract to build the social-networking site, copied the idea, and used source code that they provided to Zuckerberg to create competing site Facebook. Facebook countersued in regards to Social Butterfly, a project put out by The Winklevoss Chang Group, an alleged partnership between ConnectU and i2hub. It named among the defendants ConnectU, Cameron Winklevoss, Tyler Winklevoss, Divya Narendra, and Wayne Chang, founder of i2hub. The parties reached a settlement agreement in February 2008, for $20 million in cash and 1,253,326 Facebook shares. On August 26, 2010, The New York Times reported that Facebook shares were trading at $76 per share in the secondary market, putting the total settlement value now at close to $120 million. ConnectU filed another lawsuit against Facebook on March 11, 2008, attempting to rescind the settlement, claiming that Facebook, in settlement negotiations, had overstated the value of stock it was granting the ConnectU founders as part of the settlement. ConnectU argued that Facebook represented itself as being worth $15 billion at the time, due to the post-money valuation arising from Microsoft's purchase in 2007 of a 1.6% stake in Facebook for US$246 million. Facebook announced that valuation in a press release. However, Facebook subsequently performed an internal valuation that estimated a company value of $3.75 billion. ConnectU then fired the law firm Quinn Emanuel that had represented it in settlement discussions. Quinn Emanuel filed a $13 million lien against the settlement proceeds and ConnectU sued for malpractice. On August 25, 2010, an arbitration panel ruled that Quinn Emanuel had "earned its full contingency fee". It also found that Quinn Emanuel committed no malpractice. ConnectU's lawsuit against Facebook to quadruple its settlement remains ongoing. In January 2010, it was reported that i2hub founder Wayne Chang and The i2hub Organization launched a lawsuit against ConnectU and its founders, Cameron Winklevoss, Tyler Winklevoss, and Divya Narendra, seeking 50% of the settlement. The complaint states "Through this litigation, Chang asserts his ownership interest in The Winklevoss Chang Group and ConnectU, including the settlement proceeds." Lee Gesmer (of Gesmer Updegrove, LLP) posted the detailed 33-page complaint online. On April 12, 2011, a three-judge panel of a federal appeals court in San Francisco ruled that the Winklevoss brothers cannot back out of a settlement they signed with the company in 2008.
2006	Aaron Greenspan and houseSYSTEM	Aaron Greenspan created a web portal as an undergraduate called houseSYSTEM that launched in August 2003. Two weeks after launching Harvard became aware that houseSYSTEM was asking for students' Harvard network credentials in violation of the school's policy, and ordered Greenspan to shut the site down immediately. Greenspan was required to turn over a list of students so the administration could reset their passwords, with the threat of disciplinary action if he failed to comply. Seven months after the initial launch of houseSYSTEM Greenspan added a new social networking module called FaceNet to compete with Facebook, telling the Harvard Crimson, "It is possible for multiple sites to co-exist. [We support] entrepreneurship, and we applaud Mark’s efforts. Competition is a very real part of entrepreneurship". However, students who had tried both websites expressed doubts about Greenspan's website noting that "FaceNet isn’t as easy to use as thefacebook.com. It might be too little, too late. It will be hard to compete with thefacebook.com when thefacebook.com already has about 5,000 members and lots of momentum". In 2006, two years after Mark Zuckerberg launched thefacebook.com, Greenspan claimed in an open letter to Zuckerberg that Facebook used features that originally belonged to houseSYSTEM. Regarding Greenspan's allegations, years later Zuckerberg was described in The New York Times as "saying through a spokeswoman that he was not sure how to respond". Greenspan later filed a Petition to Cancel the "Facebook" trademark at USPTO. Facebook, Inc. agreed to a formal settlement with Greenspan in late May 2009 and issued a press release, but the terms were not disclosed.
November 17, 2009	2009 class action lawsuit	On November 17, 2009, Rebecca Swift, on behalf of herself and all others similarly situated, filed a class action lawsuit against Zynga and Facebook in the United States District Court for the Northern District of California for violation of the Unfair competition law and the Consumers Legal Remedies Act, and for unjust enrichment.

== 2010s ==
Date	Name	Description
March 2010	Lane v. Facebook, Inc.	In March 2010, Judge Richard Seeborg issued an order approving the class settlement in Lane v. Facebook, Inc. This lawsuit charged that user's private information was being posted on Facebook without consent using Facebook's Beacon program.
June 30, 2010	Paul Ceglia	On June 30, 2010, Paul Ceglia, the owner of a wood pellet fuel company in Allegany County, New York, filed a lawsuit against Zuckerberg, claiming 84% ownership of Facebook as well as additional monetary damages. According to Ceglia, he and Zuckerberg signed a contract on April 28, 2003, that for an initial fee of $1,000, entitles Ceglia to 50% of the website's revenue, as well as additional 1% interest per each day after January 1, 2004, until website completion. Zuckerberg was developing other projects at the time, among which was Facemash, the predecessor of Facebook, but did not register the domain name thefacebook.com until January 1, 2004. Facebook management has dismissed the lawsuit as "completely frivolous". Facebook spokesman Barry Schnitt issued a statement indicating that the counsel for Ceglia had unsuccessfully attempted to seek an out-of-court settlement. In an interview to ABC World News, Zuckerberg stated he is confident of never signing such an agreement. At the time, Zuckerberg worked for Ceglia as a code developer on a project named "StreetFax". Judge Thomas Brown of Allegany Court issued a restraining order on all financial transfers concerning ownership of Facebook until further notice; in response, Facebook management successfully filed for the case to be moved to federal court. According to Facebook, the order does not affect their business but lacks legal basis.
October 25, 2010	Young v. Facebook, Inc.	In Young v. Facebook, Inc., plaintiff Karen Beth Young alleged violations of the Americans with Disabilities Act and related state laws on disability as well as breach of contract and negligence. A District Court judge dismissed the complaint, ruling that Facebook is a website, not a physical place, so the Americans with Disabilities Act does not apply.
April 4, 2011	Fraley v. Facebook, Inc.	Fraley v. Facebook, Inc. was a class-action case that alleged that Facebook had misappropriated users' names and likenesses in advertisements. The case settled in 2013, with checks to class members mailed in November 2016.
October 12, 2011	Rutledge v. Facebook, Inc.	On October 12, 2011, Brooke Rutledge filed a lawsuit against Facebook, claiming that up until September 23, 2011, it had tracked users while logged-out, going as far as to gather information related to the users' browsing history. Facebook denied the allegations, claiming that the lawsuit is "without merit".
2012	Tracking logged-out users	In 2012, Facebook users sued Facebook for $15 billion for tracking them while they were logged-out via cookies and plug-ins. The issue was said to date back as early as December 2009. The lawsuit combined 21 cases across the United States from 2011 to early 2012. The lawsuit was dismissed in 2017 as the prosecutors failed to show that they had a reasonable expectation of privacy or that they had suffered economic harm, but was later revived in 2020 by a federal appeals court, which claimed that there was economic harm involved. Facebook tried to get the Supreme Court involved, but failed. On February 14, 2022, Facebook agreed to pay $90 million to settle the lawsuit, which would be distributed across affected users.
May 20, 2013	Eight Mile Style v. Facebook, Inc.	On May 20, 2013, Eminem's publisher Eight Mile Style sued Facebook for airing an advertisement on April 4 that copied Eminem's song Under the Influence, infringing his copyright.
December 30, 2013	Campbell, Hurley v. Facebook, Inc.	On December 30, 2013, Matthew Campbell and Michael Hurley filed a lawsuit against Facebook, claiming that Facebook scanned private messages that had URLs in them for purposes such as data mining and user profiling, therefore violating the Electronic Communications Privacy Act. The lawsuit was brought on behalf of all United States residents affected.
March 25, 2014	UFC-Que Choisir v. Facebook, Inc., Apple, Inc., Google, LLC	On March 25, 2014, French consumers group UFC-Que Choisir filed a lawsuit against Facebook, alongside Apple and Google, claiming that they breached users' privacy and failed to notice multiple warnings informing them to modify their terms of conditions.
June 6, 2014	Espinoza v. Facebook, Inc.	On June 6, 2014, shareholder Ernesto Espinoza sued Mark Zuckerberg and other Facebook directors over allegations that a policy that let them award directors annually more than $150 million of stock each is unreasonably generous.
March 16, 2015	Hong v. Facebook, Inc.	On March 16, 2015, Chia Hong filed a lawsuit against Facebook under allegations of gender discrimination, stating that her former boss, Anil Wilson, harassed her. Hong claimed that after filing a complaint about Wilson in October 2013, Facebook gave a negative evaluation and fired her. Hong also stated that the harassment caused her emotional distress and a loss of earnings.
2015	Six4Three, LLC v. Facebook, Inc.	In 2015, Six4Three sued Facebook for restricting its access to user data, which most of its products relied on. Later in 2017, Facebook filed an anti-SLAPP motion and in 2018, while the motion was pending, Six4Three issued a fifth amended complaint, involving individual defendants who also filed an anti-SLAPP motion. Months prior to the lawsuit going into trial in April 2019, Six4Three founder Ted Kramer released a cache of confidential Facebook documents to the British Parliament, which the judge managing the case, V Raymond Swope, condemned, questioning why Six4Three's lawyers gave Kramer access to the documents.
June 2015	Belgium v. Facebook, Inc.	In June 2015, the Belgian privacy commission sued Facebook for violating Belgian and European privacy laws by tracking logged-out users and non-users for advertising purposes, with president Willem Debeuckelaere claiming that Facebook ignores its users' privacy. A Facebook spokesperson expressed disappointment as they had planned a meetup on June 19 prior to the lawsuit being filed.
May 2016	Photo tagging lawsuit	In May 2016, Facebook faced a lawsuit from Facebook users over privacy concerns, claiming that the automatic photo tagging feature is too invasive. The lawsuit was filed as Facebook had failed to comply with the Biometric Information Privacy Act recently passed in Illinois.
May 18, 2016	Campbell v. Facebook, Inc.	On May 18, 2016, Matthew Campbell filed a lawsuit against Facebook for allegedly scanning private messages for marketing purposes, which violates federal privacy laws. Facebook argued that multiple private messages are scanned at once and that the URL data is anonymous and only used in a combined form.
December 2016	Lawsuit over San Bernardino shootings	In December 2016, the families of three victims in the 2015 San Bernardino attack sued Facebook, Google and Twitter for allowing Islamic State militants to spread propaganda on their platforms, providing support to the group and enabling attacks such as the aforementioned San Bernardino attack.
February 2017	Modamani v. Facebook, Inc.	In February 2017, Syrian refugee Anas Modamani sued Facebook after a photo he took with Chancellor Angela Merkel in August 2015 at his shelter in Berlin became the subject of a series of fake news articles, which accused refugees of being responsible for the 2016 Brussels bombings and Modamani himself of being responsible for the 2016 Berlin truck attack and an assault on a homeless man. Modamani sought to get Facebook to remove any libellous posts that included him, but the case was dismissed, with a spokesperson of the court claiming that Facebook had no involvement and instead accused the userbase of being responsible.
January 19, 2018	Godwin v. Facebook, Inc.	On January 19, 2018, Debbie Godwin filed a lawsuit against Facebook on behalf of her family after the shooting of Robert Godwin Sr. was recorded and posted on Facebook by his attacker Steve Stephens, accusing Facebook of failing to act on the threats of violence posted by Stephens and only deleting the video two hours after it had been viewed and reposted millions of times.
April 2018	Lewis v. Facebook, Inc.	In April 2018, Martin Lewis sued Facebook for defamation after it showed fake adverts featuring himself. Lewis argued that Facebook had failed to prevent false advertising across its platform, which had damaged Lewis' reputation. He stated that he would donate any money earned to charities. Later in January 2019, he dropped the lawsuit after Facebook agreed to donate £3 million to fund an anti-scam project with Citizens Advice and add a United Kingdom exclusive one-click reporting tool. Martin Lewis scams are still seen daily on Facebook however.
May 25, 2018	Schrems v. Facebook, Inc.	On May 25, 2018, various lawsuits were filed by Max Schrems against Facebook on the first day of enforcement of the General Data Protection Regulation. While Facebook has rolled out new policies to comply with the GDPR, Schrems stated that they are not enough and that they force users into an "all-or-nothing choice", which violate GDPR's conditions surrounding thorough consent.
September 21, 2018	Scola v. Facebook, Inc.	On September 21, 2018, former Facebook moderator Selena Scola filed a lawsuit against Facebook for failing to protect her and others from violent images, causing her to develop post-traumatic stress disorder. Scola urged Facebook to fund a program that will give moderators medical testing and monitoring, as well as psychiatric treatment. In May 2020, Facebook agreed to pay $52 million to current and former employees to repay them for mental health issues developed while working.
October 11, 2018	King et al. v. Facebook, Inc.	Franklin D. Azar & Associates filed a nationwide class action lawsuit on October 11, 2018, King et al. v. Facebook, Inc., Case No. 3:18-cv-06246 (N.D. Cal 2018), which also included California, New Jersey, and Colorado Sub-Classes. The lawsuit alleged that Facebook Users’ personal and private information has been compromised and remains vulnerable due to Facebook's failure to maintain adequate security measures and a lack of timely security breach notifications.
October 16, 2018	LLE One and Jonathan Murdough v. Facebook Inc.	Claimed damages arising from admittedly inaccurate Facebook statistics purporting to document a pivot to video among Facebook users.
December 19, 2018	District of Columbia v. Facebook, Inc.	On December 19, 2018, the Attorney General for the District of Columbia, Karl Racine, sued Facebook for failing to protect users' data, allowing data breaches, such as the one that exposed around half of all D.C. residents' data during the 2016 United States presidential election, to happen. Later in October 2021, he said that he would add Mark Zuckerberg to the lawsuit as a defendant. On 15 February 2022, Racine's lawyers stated that Facebook had not arranged Zuckerberg's deposition, despite a court judge allowing it in a January 10 order. On February 1, Facebook's lawyers requested the judge to block Zuckerberg's deposition, arguing that he does not have any information to give and that the District's efforts were an attempt at harassment. A filing by the District urged the judge to allow the deposition to proceed, which was later denied by the judge, calling the attempt "frankly annoying."
March 28, 2019	HUD v. Facebook, Inc.	On March 28, 2019, the United States Department of Housing and Urban Development (HUD) sued Facebook for engaging in housing discrimination by letting advertisers restrict who can see their ads based on certain characteristics, thus violating the federal Fair Housing Act. Ben Carson compared the limitations to being "just as discriminatory as slamming a door in someone's face." Facebook claimed that they just had limited the advertisers' ability to restrict their ads. In June 2022, the lawsuit was settled, with Facebook agreeing to develop a new system for housing ads and pay $115,000 in penalties, the maximum penalty under the FHA.
June 2019	Italy v. Facebook, Inc.	In June 2019, Italy's privacy watchdog sued Facebook $1.13 million after it had determined that 57 Italians downloaded the thisisyourdigitallife app via a Facebook login, allowing the app to acquire the data of around 215,000 Italian users.
July 2, 2019	Germany v. Facebook, Inc.	On July 2, 2019, German authorities filed a lawsuit against Facebook, with Germany's Federal Office of Justice stating that Facebook only took complaints from certain categories, undermining the violations on its platform. Facebook was fined €2 million for violating Germany's law on internet transparency.
September 4, 2019	Hepp v. Facebook, Inc. et al.	On September 4, 2019, Karen Hepp filed a lawsuit against Facebook as her image was used inappropriately, violating her right of publicity and damaging her reputation, adding that around two years ago, she found out that a photo took from a security camera in a convenience store appeared online in unwanted contexts, including on a Facebook ad promoting supposed meetups with "single women". The lawsuit requested that the defendants take down any instances of her photograph.
October 3, 2019	Turkey v. Facebook, Inc.	On October 3, 2019, the Turkish Data Protection Authority sued Facebook for $282,000 after the data of around 281,000 Turkish users was leaked by a data breach, stating that Facebook had violated data protection laws.
October 10, 2019	Finco Services, Inc. v. Facebook, Calibra, JLV, Character SF	On October 10, 2019, Finco Services sued Facebook, alongside its subsidiaries Calibra and JLV, and Character SF, Calibra's logo designer, claiming that the logo for Calibra looked similar to their logo. According to the lawsuit, Character apparently designed both logos.
November 26, 2019	NSO Group Technologies, Ltd. v. Facebook, Inc.	On November 26, 2019, NSO Group filed a lawsuit against Facebook, claiming that they had blocked their private Facebook and Instagram accounts unfairly, stating that it was done abruptly without any prior notice. Facebook said in a statement that it had disabled accounts that were associated with a cyber attack performed against them by NSO Group. They also stated that they had reactivated some accounts through their appeals process.
December 2019	Gray v. Facebook, Inc.	In December 2019, Chris Gray filed a lawsuit against Facebook, claiming that his job of scrolling through violent content caused him to develop post-traumatic stress disorder. According to court documents, Gray was required to review "approximately a thousand tickets per night", which were initially pornographic, and later content that was reported as being dangerous. Gray's lawyers stated that his work forced him to witness specific content and that there wasn't an option for moderators to hold or skip a ticket.

== 2020s ==
Date	Name	Description
January 16, 2020	Reveal Chat, Lenddo, Cir.cl, Beehive v. Facebook	On January 16, 2020, a lawsuit was filed against Facebook by Reveal Chat, Technology and Management Services, Cir.cl and Beehive, claiming that Facebook restricted their usage of the user data it had garnered. Yavar Bathaee, an attorney, said in a statement that "Facebook faced an existential threat from mobile apps" and that instead of responding by "competing on the merits", they had "intentionally eliminate[d] its competition".
February 2020	Internal Revenue Service v. Facebook, Inc.	See also: Ireland as a tax haven In February 2020, the Internal Revenue Service sued Facebook for tax evasion, claiming that they had sheltered $9 billion from taxes in Ireland due to its low corporate tax rates, the central point of the case being that Facebook settled a deal with an Irish subsidiary in 2010 that allows them to shuffle money around internationally.
July 2020	Ocegueda v. Facebook, Inc.	In July 2020, shareholder Natalie Ocegueda filed a lawsuit against Facebook over its lack of action against Donald Trump's statement during Black Lives Matter protests. As a result, various companies retracted their ads from the platform, such as Ben & Jerry's, Unilever, Sony and Microsoft. Afterwards, Facebook CEO Mark Zuckerberg promised to change the company's policies.
September 2020	Lawsuit over Kenosha protest deaths	In September 2020, four people filed a lawsuit against Facebook, alleging Facebook failed to remove two pages that encouraged violence against protesters. The lawsuit claimed that the Kenosha Guard and the Boogaloo Bois used Facebook as a way of garnering supporters that would help fight protesters in the protest against the Blake shooting.
November 2020	UReputation	The company UReputation, which had been involved in several cases concerning the management of digital armies, filed a lawsuit against Facebook, accusing it of unlawfully transmitting personal data to third parties. Legal actions were initiated in Tunisia, France, and the United States. In 2025, the United States District Court for the Northern District of Georgia approved a discovery procedure, allowing UReputation to access documents and evidence held by Meta.
December 3, 2020	The United States of America v. Facebook, Inc.	On December 3, 2020, the United States sued Facebook for discriminating against Americans by temporarily hiring foreign workers, stating that they had failed to advertise around 2,600 jobs correctly and consider jobs from US citizens before hiring foreign workers.
December 8, 2020	Federal Trade Commission v. Meta Platforms	On December 8, 2020, the Federal Trade Commission, along with 46 US states (excluding Alabama, Georgia, South Carolina, and South Dakota), the District of Columbia and the territory of Guam, launched an antitrust lawsuit against Facebook. The lawsuit concerns Facebook's acquisition of two competitors - Instagram and WhatsApp - and the ensuing monopolistic situation. FTC alleges that Facebook holds monopolistic power in the US social networking market and seeks to force the company to divest from Instagram and WhatsApp to break up the conglomerate. The lawsuit was initially dismissed in June 2021 but was launched again in an amended state in August 2021, citing Facebook's buyouts of rivals as a cause for alarm. In March 2022, the Chamber of Commerce rejected the 46 states' appeal to revive their lawsuit, citing the overly long waiting period between Facebooks's acquisition of WhatsApp and Instagram and the filing of the suit. In January 2022, the US District Court for the District of Columbia ruled that FTC has grounds to proceed with its antitrust lawsuit against Meta. With its amended lawsuit, FTC is seeking to make Meta sell its subsidiaries.
January 21, 2021		New Mexico Attorney General Hector Balderas sued Facebook. On October 21, 2026, State District Court Judge Francis Mathew ordered Meta to pay $25 billion.
February 2021	Jukes v. Facebook, Inc.	In February 2021, journalist Peter Jukes sued Facebook for failing to protect the data of around a million users in England and Wales, therefore violating the Data Protection Act 1998.
March 2021	Russia v. Twitter, Google, Facebook, Tiktok, Telegram	In March 2021, various cases were filed by Russia against Facebook, alongside Twitter, Google, TikTok and Telegram, after protests across Russia over the arrest of Alexei Navalny. All companies were claimed to have failed to delete posts that urged children to join the protests.
July 7, 2021	Trump v. Facebook, Inc., Twitter, Inc., Google, Inc.	On July 7, 2021, Donald Trump sued Facebook, alongside Twitter and Google, claiming that they "unlawfully silence conservative viewpoints". The lawsuit claimed that Section 230 of the Communications Decency Act protected websites from being liable for content posted by users and asked a judge to invalidate it.
November 1, 2021	Meta Company, LLC v. Facebook, Inc.	On November 1, 2021, Meta Company sued Meta Platforms (Facebook's copyright-infringing name) for infringing their copyright by stealing their name. Prior to their name change, Facebook tried to purchase the trademark from Meta Company, but were declined multiple times. On October 20, 2021, during a phone call with Facebook, Meta Company declined the offer and were told that their rights would be respected. However, on October 28, 2021, Facebook illegally changed its name to Meta Platforms and attempted to "bury [Meta Company] by force of media".
November 4, 2021	Phhhoto, Inc. v. Facebook, Inc.	On November 4, 2021, Facebook was sued by defunct app Phhhoto for allegedly copying their features and then hiding their name from search results, forcing them to go bankrupt. This came after Meta expressed interest in working with them.
November 15, 2021	The State of Ohio v. Facebook, Inc.	On November 15, 2021, Ohio Attorney General Dave Yost sued Facebook in response to allegations brought up by whistleblower Frances Haugen for allegedly violating federal securities law by deceiving the public.
December 6, 2021	Rohingya class action lawsuits	On December 6, 2021, two class action lawsuits were filed against Facebook for $150 billion by Rohingya refugees in the United States and the United Kingdom as the company failed to stop the spread of hate speech and misinformation relating to the Rohingya genocide on their platforms.
December 24, 2021	Tagansky District Court v. Facebook, Inc.	On December 24, 2021, Russian court Tagansky District Court fined Facebook for $27 million after the company declined to remove unspecified banned content. The fine was reportedly tied to the company's annual revenue in the country.
January 6, 2022	Underwood v. Facebook, Inc.	On January 6, 2022, Angela Underwood Jacobs, the sister of Dave Patrick Underwood, a federal officer who was killed in a drive-by shooting during Black Lives Matter protests in 2020, filed a lawsuit against Facebook, Inc. in California Superior Court. Jacobs alleges that Facebook promoted "extremist content" and helped connect individuals who "planned to engage in acts of violence against federal law enforcement officers", citing the boogaloo movement as one of the examples.
January 2022	Gormsen v. Facebook, Inc.	In January 2022, Liza Gormsen sued Facebook for £2.3 billion for allegedly violating the 1998 Competition Act by exploiting the data of users in the United Kingdom from October 1, 2015, to December 31, 2019.
January 20, 2022	Rodriguez v. Facebook, Inc., Snap, Inc.	On January 20, 2022, Tammy Rodriguez filed a lawsuit against Facebook and Snap Inc in the United States District Court for the Northern District of California alleging that both companies contributed to her 11-year-old daughter Selena Rodriguez's addiction, eventually leading to her suicide on July 21, 2021. Rodriguez claimed that her daughter's death was caused by her excessive use of social media, namely Instagram and Snapchat, stating that both Meta and Snap have spent billions of dollars to make their products as harmful as possible to their users' mental health.
February 3, 2022	Forrest v. Facebook, Inc.	On February 3, 2022, Australian businessman Andrew Forrest launched a lawsuit against Facebook, alleging that it violated anti-money laundering laws and that its platform is used to scam Australians. Forrest stated that he was taking action against clickbait adverts, which have begun appearing since March 2019, to prevent people from losing money, namely scams that use his likeness to advertise cryptocurrency schemes. Prior to the lawsuit, Forrest has requested Facebook to take down ads that use his image on multiple occasions, to no avail. Facebook claimed that since Forrest has registered an account, he has agreed to their terms of conditions, therefore protecting them from liability.
February 14, 2022	The State of Texas v. Facebook, Inc.	On February 14, 2022, Texas attorney general Ken Paxton sued Facebook for violating the state privacy laws from 2010 to late 2021 by collecting biometric data of their Facebook and Instagram users without their consent and then sharing it with third parties and not deleting it in time, despite Meta announcing that it would delete all data it had collected after shutting down its facial recognition system in 2020. The court was asked to fine Facebook $25,000 for each violation of the Capture or Use of Biometric Identifier Act (CUBI) and $10,000 for each violation of Texas' Deceptive Trade Practices Act (DTPA). In July 2024, Meta agreed to pay Texas $1.4 billion to settle the lawsuit.
February 15, 2022	Davis v. Renaissance Charter School at Pines, Facebook, Inc.	On November 19, 2021, 13-year-old Nia Whims was arrested and put in a juvenile detention center after the police thought she sent a bomb threat to her school Renaissance Charter School at Pines and death threats to a student via Instagram. Later on February 10, 2022, the police found out that another student was behind the account and released Whims. On February 15, 2022, her mother Lezlie-Ann Davis filed a lawsuit against Renaissance Charter School at Pines and Facebook for failing to protect her daughter, with further plans to add Pembroke Pines Police Department to the lawsuit.
February 22, 2022	Dangaard et al. v. Instagram, LLC et al.	On February 22, 2022, a lawsuit on behalf of three adult entertainers was filed against several companies, including Meta Platforms, for allegedly blacklisting their content under the Global Internet Forum to Counter Terrorism's (GIFCT) database as they were advertising rival companies of OnlyFans, despite not containing any terrorist themes. Meta was involved as they were believed to have been conspiring with OnlyFans.
March 8, 2022	Plumbers and Steamfitters Local 60 Pension Trust v. Facebook Inc. et al.	On March 8, 2022, Labaton Sucharow filed a class action lawsuit against Meta, on behalf of Plumbers and Steamfitters Local 60 Pension Trust, for allegedly falsely reassuring its investors that the impacts of Apple's privacy tweaks to iPhone software "were manageable", only to later report a loss of $10 billion in advertising revenue as a result of the changes. The lawsuit also states that Meta's executives failed to inform investors of Meta's failed attempts at offsetting any financial hits.
March 18, 2022	Australian Competition and Consumer Commission v. Facebook Inc.	On March 18, 2022, Australian watchdog Australian Competition & Consumer Commission sued Meta over claims of it either helping or failing to stop false cryptocurrency advertisements appearing on Facebook, which featured Australian public figures.
June 2022	Class Action v. Facebook Inc.	Eight complaints in courthouses across the US allege that Meta Inc. aggressively targeted youth with exposure to its platforms Facebook, Instagram, leading to eating and sleep disorders, and attempted and actual suicides.
June 2022	Class Action v. Facebook Inc.	In June 2022, an anonymous "John Doe" plaintiff in the Northern District of California filed a putative class action against Facebook, alleging that the platform violated the Health Insurance Portability and Accountability Act (HIPAA) by collecting patient-sensitive data without consent. The lawsuit alleged that at least 664 hospitals or medical providers deployed the Meta Pixel to unlawfully gain access to patient medical information.
June 21, 2022	United States v. Meta Platforms Inc.	On June 21, 2022, the US Justice Department Civil Rights Division filed a lawsuit in the Southern New York US District Court alleging that the company's Lookalike audience tool for targeted advertising on Facebook discriminates against users based on their race, color, religion, sex, disability, familial status, and national origin in its distribution of housing advertisements in violation of Title VIII of the Civil Rights Act of 1968. Meta Platforms settled with the Justice Department on the same day the lawsuit was filed.
July 2022	Class Action v. Meta Platforms Inc.	In July 2022, a former Army vet and member of Facebook's escalation team sued Facebook. The lawsuit claimed that Facebook introduced a tool in 2019 to allow staff access to deleted Messenger data and that this data was sometimes shared with law enforcement.
July 2022	META v. Meta Platforms Inc.	In July 2022, a company called META (full name METAx LLC) sued Meta Platforms for allegedly stealing its brand name.
July 2022	Epidemic Sound v. Meta Platforms Inc.	In July 2022, Epidemic Sound, a Swedish music company, filed an infringement lawsuit against Facebook and Meta for $142 million. The lawsuit claims that Meta hosts 94% of Epidemic's music in its own library without licensing or authorization. Epidemic alleged that Facebook commits upwards of 80,000 copyright infractions per day.
July 27, 2022	Federal Trade Commission v. Meta Platforms Inc.	On July 27, 2022, the Federal Trade Commission (FTC) filed an antitrust lawsuit against Meta Platforms in the Northern California US District Court requesting a temporary restraining order and preliminary injunction to block its acquisition of Within Unlimited under the Federal Trade Commission Act of 1914. In February 2023, Judge Edward Davila denied the FTC's request for an injunction, while the FTC announced that it would cancel an administrative proceeding against the acquisition.
September 6, 2022	Ireland's Data Protection Commissioner (DPC) v. Meta Platforms Inc.	On September 6, it was announced that Irish regulators have fined Instagram €405m for failing to protect and violating children's privacy. This came after it was discovered that children users who switched to business accounts had their data, such as phone numbers and email addresses, public.
July 25, 2023	K.G.M. v. Meta et al.	A plaintiff, identified as K.G.M., filed a lawsuit against Meta and three other social media companies alleging that the companies had engineered their sites to make their users engage compulsively using techniques such as infinite scrolling, algorithmic recommendations, and automatic video play. On March 25, 2026, a jury found that the companies were negligent in the design of their apps, with Meta ordered to pay $4.2 million in damages.
December 5, 2023	State of New Mexico v. Meta Platforms, Inc.	Attorney General of New Mexico Raúl Torrez filed a lawsuit against Meta alleging that it knowingly harmed children's mental health and concealed what it knew about child sexual exploitation on its social media platforms. In March 2026, a jury found that Meta violated New Mexico's Unfair Practices Act and ordered it to pay $375 million. On August 6, 2026, Meta was ordered to pay an additional $567 million in damages and was labeled a public nuisance.
May 10, 2024	Metacapital Management v. Meta Platforms Inc.	May 10, 2024, it was announced that Metacapital Management and Meta Platforms had resolved the trademark issue and agreed to a settlement in principle. Metacapital Management has been using the name since 2001 and Meta Platforms was the new rebranded name from Facebook in 2021.
June 27, 2024	Rajaram v. Meta Platforms Inc.	Purushothaman Rajaram, a naturalized United States citizen, alleged that Meta Platforms, Inc., refused to hire him because it prefers to hire noncitizens holding H1B visas to whom it can pay lower wages. The lawsuit was originally filed on June 27, 2024. In February 2025, US Magistrate Judge Laurel Beeler in San Francisco said three US citizens (including Rajaram) who accused Meta of refusing to hire them though they were qualified may pursue a proposed class action. Beeler had dismissed an earlier version of the lawsuit, which named only Rajaram as a plaintiff, in November 2022.
August 18, 2026	People of the State of California v. Meta Platforms, Inc.	29 US states alleged that Meta has created a product, which fuels harmful addiction in children, deliberately attracts them, and illegally collects their data. The states also claim Meta has neglected to provide age verification and that it has misled Congress and the public about youth safety on its platforms. Settled on August 26, 2026, with Meta agreeing to pay $16.7 billion and implement age restrictive features to limit access to minors and enhance parental controls.
October 22, 2026	Meta v. New Mexico	Meta fined $25bn for 'lies' over user data privacy. "The lies extend beyond Facebook's data practices," according to the judge.

== See also ==
- Facebook history
- Criticism of Facebook
- Europe v Facebook
- Issues involving social networking services
