= Young v. Facebook, Inc. =

- Court: United States District Court for the Northern District of California
- Decided: May 17, 2011
- Citation: 790 F. Supp. 2d 1110

Holding
- The Court ruled that the social network Facebook was not liable for the alleged violations brought forth by the plaintiff. The court granted Facebook's motion to dismiss the case without leave to amend.

Court membership
- Judge sitting: Jeremy Fogel

Young v. Facebook, Inc., 790 F. Supp. 2d 1110, is a pro se internet law case in which the plaintiff sued the social network Facebook following the termination of her user account. In her original complaint, the plaintiff, Karen Beth Young, alleged violation of her First and Fourteenth Amendment rights, breach of contract, breach of the implied covenant of good faith and fair dealing, negligence, and fraud. In the U.S. District Court of Northern California, Facebook moved to dismiss the claim, and on October 25, 2010, presiding Judge Jeremy Fogel granted the motion to dismiss with leave to amend. Redirecting her complaint, Young alleged violations of the Americans with Disabilities Act and related state laws on disability, as well as breach of contract and negligence. Again, Facebook moved to dismiss, and Judge Fogel dismissed the case without leave to amend.

== Background ==
Karen Beth Young of Maryland created an account on Facebook in February 2010 in order to connect with friends, family, and strangers. Young's mother and sister were both fighting breast cancer at the time and Young created two pages to promote cancer awareness. She quickly amassed over 4,000 friends by sending friend invites to others supportive of the cancer cause and by receiving requests from strangers who were interested in and concerned about her cancer patient support efforts. Young then came across a page praying for the death of U.S. President Barack Obama, and she spoke out against the page. She was then subjected to "hatred, violence, discrimination, threats, pornography, kkk, violence and personal attacks [sic]." In conjunction with her public opposition of the hate page and her allegedly "spammy" activity, her profile was disabled.

Young then traveled from Maryland to Facebook's headquarters in California and sought reactivation of her account. In testimony, she stated that she did not receive "human interaction" with a Facebook account representative at Facebook's offices, and had to provide a written message to a receptionist for forwarding to an unknown recipient. She filled out a complaint form and was not allowed to speak with a Facebook account representative. Later, she received Facebook email stating her account was reactivated, but she was not provided any opportunity to discuss her account details so she traveled back to Maryland. Shortly thereafter, Young again found her account disabled. According to Facebook, Young had engaged in activity that violated Facebook's statement of rights and responsibilities, although Young states she did nothing to prompt the second disabling of her account which resulted in permanent termination of her account. Young then drove back to California to file a lawsuit in the Northern District of California.

== Original complaint and motion to dismiss ==
Young claimed six causes of action in her first complaint against Facebook; a violation of her First Amendment and Fourteenth Amendment rights, a breach of contract, a breach of implied covenant of faith and fair dealing, negligence, and fraud.

=== Civil rights violation ===
Young argued that Facebook deprived her of equal protection under the law by terminating her account, and she sought to state this claim under 42 U.S.C. § 1983. She pointed out her disability. She claimed that Facebook was a government actor and acted "under color of state law". She stated that Facebook hosted the profiles of several State and government departments, demonstrating a contract between Facebook and the state.

However, Facebook argued that it was a private entity, and the court agreed, arguing that "Young shows no relationship between Facebook's government contracts and the particular actions that she alleges violated her rights".

=== Breach of contract ===
Young referenced Facebook's own statement of rights and responsibilities that forbids users against posting content that is "hateful, threatening, or pornographic; incites violence; or contains nudity" and claimed that Facebook acted in "deliberate indifference to the rights of the Plaintiff".

However, Facebook has long held a policy against any policing of content in its statement of rights and responsibilities. The court agreed and stated "while these provisions place restrictions on users' behavior, they do not create affirmative obligations".

=== Breach of implied covenant of faith and fair dealing ===
Young claimed that Facebook broke the implied covenant of good faith and fair dealing by failing to provide the adequate safety services it advertised and by ultimately deactivating the account without "human interaction".

Facebook claimed that it never agreed to provide safety services and that the covenant of good faith could not alter that fact. Furthermore, Facebook was also protected under Section 230 of the Communications Decency Act which provides immunity for internet service providers who publish information generated by third parties.

The court sided with Facebook on this point as well, stating that Facebook had sent Young an email notifying her of the account termination, in accordance with its policies, upholding its contract.

=== Negligence and fraud ===
The plaintiff alleged negligence and fraud on the part of Facebook. However, the court found that the plaintiff did not show that Facebook had a duty on which to base the negligence claim, and that the plaintiff's claim of fraud lacked enough specificity to proceed with legal pleading.

== Holding ==
Given the rationale, Judge Jeremy Fogel of the United States District Court for the Northern District of California granted Facebook's motion to dismiss the claim with leave to amend.

== Motion to dismiss amended complaint ==
The plaintiff amended her complaint to include claims under the Americans with Disabilities Act and related state laws. Facebook moved to dismiss the plaintiff's complaints, and Judge Fogel granted the motion on May 17, 2011, finding that Facebook was not a physical place for the purpose of the Americans with Disabilities Act, "despite its frequent use of terms such as 'posts' and 'walls'". Judge Fogel denied leave to amend.

== Reception ==
Eric Goldman, an internet law professor at Santa Clara University, noted that Section 230 of the Communications Decency Act could well apply to at least some of Young's claims from the second complaint.

== See also ==
- National Federation of the Blind v. Target Corporation
- Ouellette v. Viacom International Inc.
- Lawsuits involving Meta Platforms
