= National Federation of the Blind v. Target Corp. =

2006 American class action lawsuit

- Court: United States District Court for the Northern District of California
- Full case name: National Federation of the Blind v. Target Corporation
- Decided: September 6, 2006
- Docket nos.: 3:06-cv-01802
- Citation: 452 F. Supp. 2d 946

Case history
- Subsequent actions: Class certified, 582 F. Supp. 2d 1185 (N.D. Cal. 2007).

Court membership
- Judge sitting: Marilyn Hall Patel

National Federation of the Blind v. Target Corporation, 452 F. Supp. 2d 946 (N.D. Cal. 2006), was a class action lawsuit in the United States that was filed on February 7, 2006, in the Superior Court of California for the County of Alameda, and subsequently moved to federal court (the district court for the northern district of California). The case challenged whether the Americans with Disabilities Act of 1990, specifically Title III's provisions prohibiting discrimination by "places of public accommodation" (42 U.S.C. 12181 et seq), apply to websites and/or the Internet, or are restricted to physical places.

The plaintiff, National Federation of the Blind (NFB), sued Target Corporation, a national retail chain, claiming that blind people were unable to access much of the information on the defendant's website, nor purchase anything from its website independently. In August 2008, the NFB and Target reached a class action settlement.

== Title III of the ADA and Public Accommodations ==
The Americans with Disabilities Act (ADA) was signed into law in 1990 with the intent of eliminating discrimination on the basis of disability. Some of the protections listed in the ADA for people with disabilities include the rights to equal places of public accommodations as non-disabled people. Each title of the ADA provides different protections to people with disabilities; Title III of the ADA is specifically designed to forbid "discrimination against persons on the basis of disability in the full and equal enjoyment of the goods, services, facilities, privileges, advantages, or accommodations of any place of public accommodation by any person who owns, leases (or leases to), or operates a place of public accommodation." The ADA defines "places of public accommodations" as a place that is operated by a private entity which is categorized into twelve groups. Some of these categories cover public entities such as restaurants, parks, hospitals, museums, offices, theaters, hotels, and stores.

With the Americans with Disabilities Act being enacted before the Internet existed, the term "public accommodation" has been historically interpreted as a physical place. The ADA does not clearly address accessibility to the Internet for people with disabilities, along with not defining "public accommodations" as either a physical facility or place. Both the statue and the implementing regulations of Title III by the Department of Justice do not mention the Internet. From Congress' broad definition of "public accommodations" and with the Internet being a new concept, issues on accessibility to the Internet have become controversial. Lack of clarity from Congress, as well as a lack of case law analyzing Internet accessibility, has caused this issue to remain unresolved. National Federation of the Blind v. Target Corp. has become one of the most recent court cases that has addressed and analyzed this issue to give more clarity.

== Pre-trial negotiations and filing ==
A series of unsuccessful negotiations were commenced between the NFB and Target Corporation in May 2005, which continued until January 2006. In May 2005, the NFB wrote to Target, asking for it to make its website accessible to people who are blind. The NFB requested that Target optimize its website accessibility for the blind by adopting standards promulgated by the World Wide Web Consortium, including the Web Content Accessibility Guidelines or the Architectural and Transportation Barriers Compliance Board's Section 508 Amendment to the Rehabilitation Act of 1973 standards, specifically encouraging Target to adopt the alt attribute for clickable images featured on the website. In its petition, NFB alleged that in one instance, when a blind user visiting this website selected an image of a Dyson vacuum cleaner using his or her tab key, the voice synthesizer on the computer would say "Link GP browse dot HTML reference zero six zero six one eight nine six three eight one eight zero seven two nine seven three five 12 million 957 thousand 121" instead of a useful description of the image. The NFB also claimed that the site lacked image maps and other accommodations, which prevented legally blind individuals from navigating through the website, and that the design of the online checkout pages prevented users with visual disabilities from being able to determine where the mouse pointer was on the screen.

On February 7, 2006, the NFB filed a civil lawsuit against Target Corporation in the Superior Court of California for the County of Alameda, alleging that the defendant's website operated in violation of the California Unruh Civil Rights Act, the California Disabled Persons Act (Civil Code Sections 54 – 55.32), and the Americans with Disabilities Act of 1990. Along with the NFB, the National Federation of the Blind of California (NFB-CA) and Bruce Sexton, a blind individual who represented himself and his own experiences in the case as well as "all others similarly situated," filed the lawsuit as plaintiffs.

== Motions ==
Following a successful motion for removal of the case to federal court on March 6, 2006, a subsequent motion to dismiss for failure to state a claim was filed by Target Corporation in defense of the allegations. In its motion to dismiss, Target Corporation argued that the applicable civil rights laws mandated that only retail stores must provide accessibility accommodations to disabled persons, and thus that dismissal should be granted for failure to state a valid claim against its online activities. Target argued that the Americans with Disabilities Act of 1990 was intended to apply exclusively to physical accommodations instead of cyberspace, and that such application of the California acts on accessibility would violate the Commerce Clause of the United States Constitution.

== Holding ==
On September 7, 2006, the court ordered that a retailer may be sued if its website is inaccessible to the blind. In the court's opinion, Judge Marilyn Hall Patel explained that the order of the court was based upon "42 U.S. Code § 12182", the prohibition of discrimination by public accommodations clause of the Americans with Disabilities Act of 1990, which prohibits discrimination in the "enjoyment of goods, services, facilities or privileges."

On October 2, 2007, the U.S. Federal District Court for the Northern District of California certified a nationwide class action pursuit against Target Corporation consisting of all legally blind individuals in the United States who had attempted to access Target.com and as a result were denied access to the enjoyment of goods and services offered in the defendant's stores. The order further certified a California subclass, which included all legally blind individuals in California who attempted to access Target.com on behalf of blind Internet customers. The court previously denied Target's motion to dismiss and upheld NFB's argument that websites like Target.com must be accessible to the blind under both California law and the Americans with Disabilities Act (ADA).

== Settlement and award ==
In August 2008, the parties reached a civil action settlement. As stipulated in the settlement agreement, "there is no admission or concession by Target, direct or indirect, express or implied, that Target.com is any way inaccessible or that Target has violated the Unruh Civil Rights Act, California Civil Code §§ 51 et seq., the Disabled Persons Act, California Civil Code §§ 54 et seq., the Americans with Disabilities Act, 42 U.S.C. §§ 12181 et seq., or any other federal, state, or local law, regulation, order, or rule." The three-year term agreement stated that Target would pay $6 million to the California settlement class for damages. This payment is not inclusive of attorney's fees, which Target also agreed to pay. Additionally, the agreement stipulated conditions in which Target would work with the NFB to ensure equal accessibility standards of Target.com. This would require NFB certification, NFB monitoring, NFB training, and guest feedback. Any future disputes involving the agreement were required to be resolved through the order of meeting and conferral, then mediation, and finally submission to U.S. magistrate judge, if a resolution could not be reached.

On August 3, 2009, Judge Patel awarded $3.7 million in attorney's fees and costs to the plaintiffs. The court substantiated the award by declaring that the "plaintiffs have broken new ground in an important area of law" and noting that the "litigation [extended] important areas of disability law into an emerging form of electronic commerce that promises to grow in importance."

== Aftermath ==
The intent of the court order was to certify that certain online retailers may be required to provide access to disabled people. Target issued a response by claiming "We believe our Web site complies with all applicable laws and are committed to vigorously defending this case. We will continue to implement technology that increases the usability of our Web site for all our guests, including those with disabilities."

On February 9, 2010, the NFB awarded the Gold Level NFB-NVA Certification to Target.com. The NFB and Target have established a continued partnership to help ensure equal access is given to Target.com products and information to blind consumers and the NFB commended Target as a leader in web accessibility.

On June 2, 2016, Target and the NFB entered into an agreement designating Target as a Strategic Nonvisual Access Partner of the NFB.

== See also ==
- ADA Litigation in the United States
- List of class action lawsuits
- Young v. Facebook, Inc.
- Ouellette v. Viacom International Inc.
- Access Now, Inc. v. Southwest Airlines Co.
