= UAE Public Library and Cultural Center =

Abu Dhabi Public Library and Cultural Center
- Cultural Center
- Alternative names: Cultural foundation

General information
- Location: Cultural Foundation, Sheikh Zayed 1st Street, Abu Dhabi, Abu Dhabi, United Arab Emirates
- Coordinates: 24.419438°N 54.446896°E
- Opened: 1981

Design and construction
- Architecture firm: The Architects' Collaborative
- Awards: International Design Excellence Awards

Website
- Official site

The UAE Public Library and Cultural Center is actually three buildings: a 1,000,000 volume National Library, a performance auditorium and a Conference/Exhibit Center. The site includes a main entrance court with a central fountain, an amphitheater for public & children's performances and a parking facility.

Designed by architect Hisham N. Ashkouri as the 1st Prize entry in an International Design Competition in 1976, the design is representative of most modern construction technologies but incorporates local architectural styles and elements, such as decorative glazed brick tiled arcades. Construction was completed in 1982. The total building cost in today's dollars was $56.1 M.

The building was demolished to form another set of buildings called The Qasr Al Hosn which serves as a museum and an exhibition center about the U.A.E's culture. Every year a grand exhibition called Al Hosn is hosted there.
