= Hisham N. Ashkouri =

American architect (1948–2025)

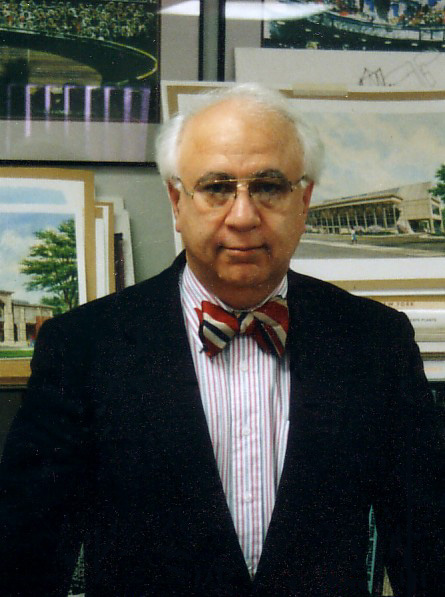
- Born: August 15, 1948; Baghdad, Iraq
- Died: December 23, 2025 (aged 77); Massachusetts, U.S.
- Occupation: Architect
- Awards: Ministry of Oil and Minerals, Baghdad, Iraq
- Practice: ARCADD, Inc.
- Buildings: UAE Public Library and Cultural Center, Playground For All Children, University of Baghdad Campus Expansion, Massachusetts General Hospital Pediatrics Floors
- Projects: Baghdad Renaissance Plan, City of Light Development,

Hisham Nasrat Ashkouri (Arabic: هشام أشكري, August 15, 1948 – December 23, 2025) was an American architect and urban designer who was based in Boston and New York.

== Early life ==
Ashkouri was born in Baghdad, Iraq, on August 15, 1948. He graduated first in class in 1970 with a Bachelor of Architecture Degree from the University of Baghdad and continued for his Masters of Architecture at the University of Pennsylvania under the late Louis I. Kahn in 1973. He further completed his Urban Design studies at Harvard University and M.I.T. with Masters in Urban Design in 1975. Ashkouri completed his Doctoral work in Ergonomics at Tufts University in 1983.

He worked with Hisham Munir and Associates in Iraq before coming to the United States. He then worked at The Architects Collaborative in Cambridge, Massachusetts, contributing to the Arlington Hadassah Way and the Westin Hotel at Copley Place, both in Boston, as well as the University of Baghdad Campus Expansion, before establishing ARCADD, Inc. in 1986 as an independent architect and urban designer. Ashkouri has initiated several international developments mainly in Iraq and Afghanistan including the Baghdad Renaissance Plan, $13 billion, the Tahrir Square Development, $860 million, the Sindbad Hotel Complex and Conference Center, $35 billion, the City of Light Development, Kabul, $9.6 billion and the Afghan National Museum, Library and Cultural Center, $247 million, both for the reconstruction of Kabul. Ashkouri is currently working on developments in the United States.

== National work ==
Ashkouri was the architect and developer of the Cold Spring Green townhouse development in Newton, MA - a modern, open-concept design integrating green energy systems.

He established the standard specifications for branches of the U.S. Post Office.

He contributed to the Pediatrics floors of the Massachusetts General Hospital in Boston, and also performed restoration and renovation work on many public and municipal buildings throughout New England.

While working for The Architects' Collaborative in 1974, Ashkouri led the urban planning and design effort for the conceptual plan for the expansion of the Capitol Center for the City of Tallahassee, FL, and in 1983 was the architect for the interior spaces, conference center, and guest rooms of the Westin Hotel at Copley Place in Boston, MA.

== International work ==
Ashkouri's designs abroad include:

- University of Baghdad Campus Expansion (with TAC)
- Sindbad Hotel Complex and Conference Center, Baghdad, Iraq
- Baghdad Renaissance Plan, Baghdad, Iraq
- Tahrir Square Development, Baghdad, Iraq
- City of Light Development, Kabul, Afghanistan
- Afghan National Museum, Kabul, Afghanistan
- Area 5 and Area 9 Parking Structures, Kuwait City, Kuwait
- Regatta Mediterranean Resort, Tripoli, Libya
- Noorland - a Green, New City Development, Kazan, Tatarstan, Russian Federation

He developed city-scale reconstruction and infrastructure plans for war-torn countries such as Iraq and Afghanistan through his architecture firm ARCADD, Inc. Ashkouri garnered support for a number of these developments through private sector investment, and he received insurance support from the Overseas Private Investment Corporation (OPIC) for these projects. He worked on promoting US-made products for these developments with the US Department of Commerce. Ashkouri supported private investment in Kabul jointly with the Embassy of Afghanistan in the U.S.

== Competitions ==
His first winning design competition entry was for the Government of Iraq in 1972 while working with Hisham Munir and Associates for the “First Oil Compound to be built for the Nation”, the Ministry of Oil and Minerals. Other national competitions awarded were for the Baghdad City Hall, the College of Agriculture at Sulimaniyah, and the Ministry of Justice. He was also declared the winner of the design competition for the Baghdad Opera House, but that award was rescinded when the government of Iraq realized he was in the United States. He won the International Design Competition for the UAE Public Library and Cultural Center, the Killington Skiing Village Complex Design Competition for Killington, Vermont, the competition for the Kansai-Khan Library in Tokyo, Japan, and the design competition for the Playground For All Children in Flushing Meadows-Corona Park in Queens, New York, the first such play area for both able-bodied and disabled children.

== Death ==
Ashkouri died at a hospital in Massachusetts on December 23, 2025, at the age of 77.

== See also ==
- Iraqi art
- Reconstruction of Iraq
