= Sindbad Hotel Complex and Conference Center =

Hotel in Baghdad, Iraq

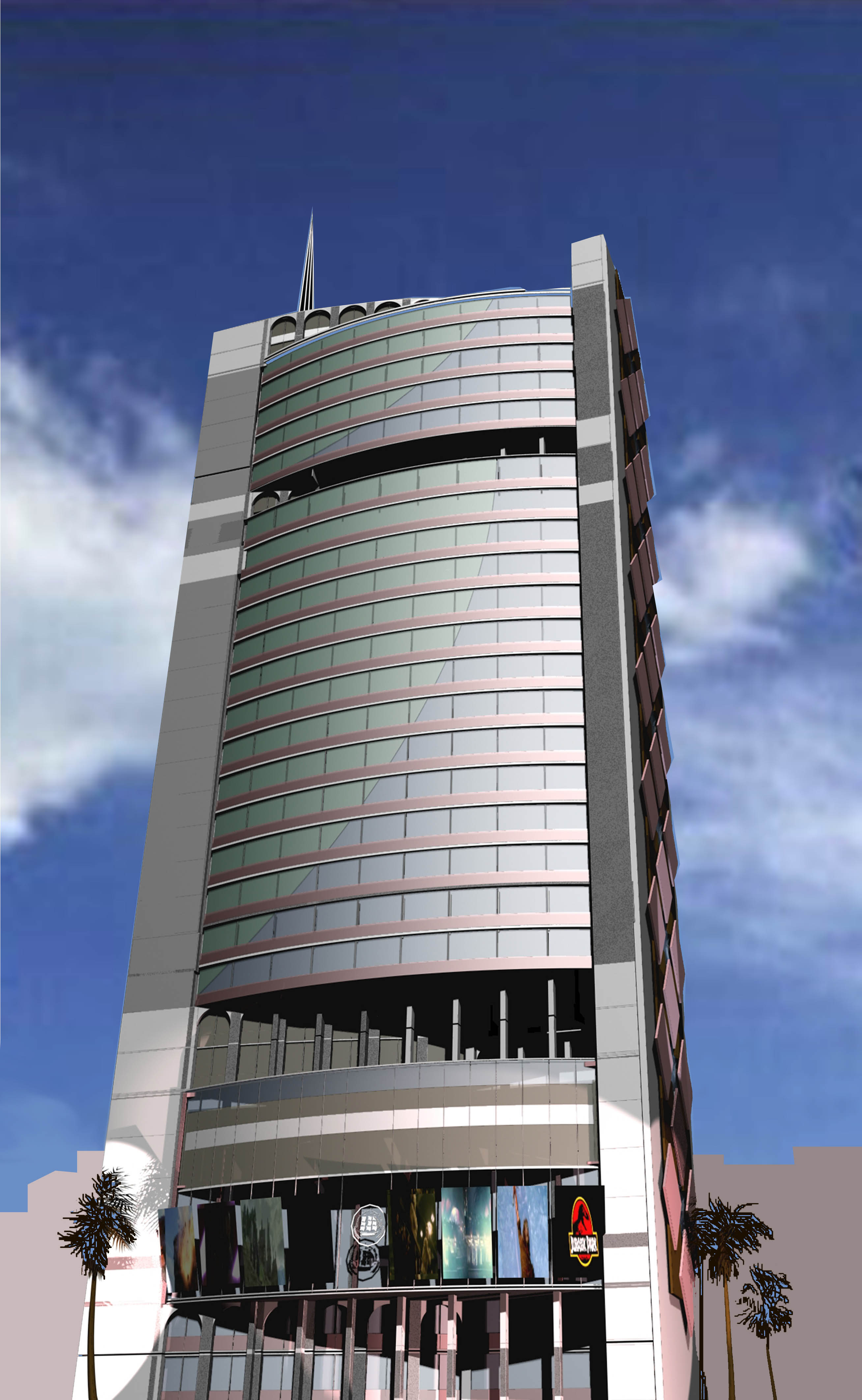
A rendering of the Sindbad Hotel Complex and Conference Center

The Sindbad Hotel Complex and Conference Center was a proposed hotel to have been located in Baghdad, Iraq.

== History ==
It was to be named after Sinbad the Sailor. Designed by architect Hisham N. Ashkouri in 2004, it was to be the first new high-rise hotel, conference center and movie theater complex in modern Baghdad, as a symbol of the reconstruction of Iraq. This new commercial center was designed to be a place for gathering and recreation, as well as to conduct the business of the emerging Iraqi economy. It would also be an employer of several hundred construction workers, bringing an influx of capital into the local economy, and after construction would employ several hundred more citizens in an ongoing capacity.

Though granted political risk insurance for the project by OPIC in 2004, private investors were hesitant to commit to the initial phases of development.

Total project cost was estimated in 2005 to be approximately $113 M USD.

== See also ==
- Baghdad Renaissance Plan
- Tahrir Square Development
- Kabul, City of Light Development
