= Said Tayeb Jawad =

Afghan politician and diplomat

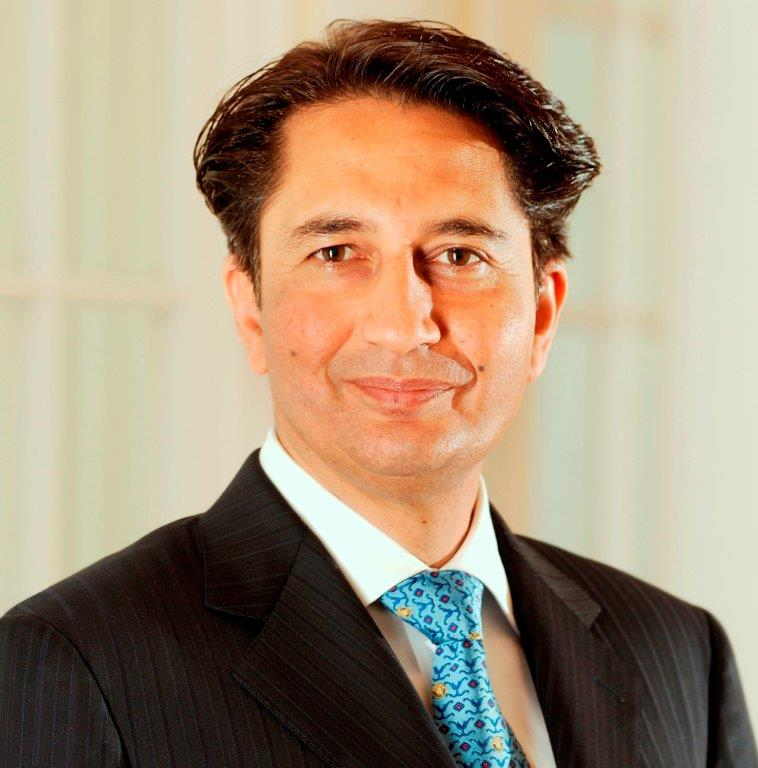

Ambassador of Afghanistan to the Russian Federation
- In office 2021 – April 4, 2022
- President: Ashraf Ghani
- Succeeded by: Jamal Nasir Gharwal (charge d'affaires)

Ambassador of Afghanistan to the United Kingdom
- In office March 22, 2017 – 2020
- President: Ashraf Ghani
- Preceded by: Dr Mohammad Daud Yaar

13th Ambassador of Afghanistan to the United States of America
- In office December 4, 2003 – September 22, 2010
- President: Hamid Karzai
- Preceded by: Isaq Sharhyar
- Succeeded by: Eklil Ahmad Hakimi

Chief of Staff
- In office 2002–2003
- President: Hamid Karzai
- Succeeded by: Mohammad Omar Daudzai

Personal details
- Born: February 22, 1958 (age 68) Kandahar, Afghanistan
- Spouse: Shamim Jawad
- Children: Iman Jawad
- Profession: Academic and Diplomat

Said Tayeb Jawad (Persian: سید طیب جواد, born 1958) is an Afghan politician, businessman, academic, and diplomat. He is the Chief Executive officer of Capitalize LLC, Global Political Strategist and Senior Counselor at APCO Worldwide, and the Chairman of the American University of Afghanistan, a prominent private, liberal arts, not-for-profit, co-education University.

As CEO of Capitalize LLC, a strategic consulting firm based in Washington, D.C., he leads a team of international business experts, advising companies, and investors on renewable energy, electrical vehicle infrastructure, defense, security, market entry, commercial opportunities, and development strategies in the United States, Central Asia, and the Gulf regions.

As diplomat, he has served as the last ambassador of the Islamic Republic of Afghanistan to the Russian Federation, from 2021 to 2022. From 2017 to 2020, Jawad served as Ambassador to the United Kingdom of Great Britain and Northern Ireland. From December 2003 to September 2010, Jawad served as Ambassador to the United States. He was also the non-resident Ambassador to Mexico, Brazil, Colombia, and Argentina. From 2002 to 2003, he was chief of staff to President Hamid Karzai.

As an academic, Jawad joined Harvard University's Future of Diplomacy Project at the Belfer Center for Science and International Affairs in the John F. Kennedy School of Government as the inaugural Fisher Family Fellow. In February 2011, he became Diplomat-in-Residence at Johns Hopkins University's Paul H. Nitze School of Advanced International Studies. He currently serves as the Chairman of the Foundation for Afghanistan. He is also a Global Political Strategist at APCO Worldwide and a member of Advisory Board of the Concordia Summit.

== Background ==
Said Tayeb Jawad was born in the city of Kandahar in Afghanistan. He received higher education at Lycée Esteqlal and at the School of Law and Political Sciences in Kabul University. In 1980, shortly after the Soviet invasion of Afghanistan, he left the country and went into exile in Germany, where he studied law at the University of Münster.

In 1986, he settled in the United States, where he earned his MBA from the Golden Gate University in San Francisco and worked for a number of prominent law firms, including as a legal consultant at Steefel, Levitt & Weiss, a San Francisco Embarcadero law firm.

As Afghan Ambassador to the United States, he re-established the Embassy of Afghanistan in Washington, D.C. and developed it into one of the most responsive and successful missions in Washington. He managed Afghanistan's diplomacy at a critical time with its key strategic partner through extensive interaction with the White House, State Department, Pentagon, U.S. Congress, U.S. media, and academia; and initiated Afghanistan's diplomatic relations with Brazil, Argentina, Colombia, and Mexico.

He is fluent in several languages, including Persian, Pashto, English, German and French. He is married to Shamim Jawad, Founder and President of Ayenda Foundation, a charitable organization that works on projects for women and children in Afghanistan.

== Political career ==
=== Return to Afghanistan ===
Jawad went back to Afghanistan in March 2002. He worked for Afghan President Hamid Karzai's office and became his press secretary. By June, in addition to trying to coordinate the loya jirga, or grand council, for thousands of delegates and journalists, Jawad had become Karzai's Chief of Staff.

Until late 2003, he served as the President's Press Secretary, Chief of Staff, as well as the Director of the Office of International Relations at the Presidential Palace. Jawad has worked closely with President Karzai in formulating strategies, implementing policies, building national institutions, and prioritizing reforms in Afghanistan. He also worked with the U.S. and Afghan military experts to help reform the Ministry of Defense, disarm local warlords, and rebuild the Afghan National Army. Jawad was instrumental in drafting Afghanistan's foreign investment laws; he served as President Karzai's principal liaison with the constitutional commission throughout the drafting of the Constitution of Afghanistan. As Chief of Staff, he accompanied the President and managed all foreign trips and state visits. He observed cabinet meetings and participated in the National Security Council meetings.

=== Ambassador to the United States ===
On December 4, 2003, Jawad assumed his official duties as Ambassador of Afghanistan to the United States and non-resident ambassador to Mexico, Brazil, Colombia, and Argentina, making him Afghanistan's 19th top representative to the U.S. since diplomatic relations were established between the two countries in 1934. "Embassy of Afghanistan – History – About the Embassy".

As part of his role as Afghanistan's envoy to the U.S., Jawad has worked closely with two presidential administrations on U.S. strategy towards Afghanistan; developed close links to members of the U.S. Congress; hosted numerous visits of high-level ministers and President Karzai; appeared in newspaper, magazine, radio, and television interviews; spoken before audiences at universities, think tanks, charitable organizations and community groups; and received awards and commendations for his work for Afghanistan.

Jawad has appeared numerous times in major American and international papers and television shows. He also regularly lectures and speaks at prominent universities and think tanks. According to the Washington Times Jawad has maintained a high profile for Afghanistan, even as most public attention since 2003 has been focused on the Iraq War.Washington Times: Afghan Progress

In late 2009, there were rumours that Jawad would be appointed foreign minister of Afghanistan Mondiaal Nieuws Nieuwe regering, maar oude gewoonten in Afghanistan Tolo TV: Afghan people want removal of present cabinet members but Karzai appointed Zalmai Rasul instead.

Jawad has participated in hundreds of conferences and forums related to Afghanistan and the region. Jawad is an avid polo player and a member of the Capitol Polo Club in Maryland. He played in the Green Cup and is a member of the United States Polo Association. Jawad has participated in many significant conferences and forums related to Afghanistan and the region in the past decade.

=== Ambassador to the United Kingdom of Great Britain and Northern Ireland ===
On January 2, 2017, Jawad was selected to serve as Afghanistan's Ambassador to the United Kingdom. On June 27, 2017, Jawad presented his Letter of Credentials to HM Queen Elizabeth II and officially took office as Ambassador of Afghanistan to the United Kingdom of Great Britain and Northern Ireland. Ambassador Jawad's focus since the beginning of his tenure has been to strengthen political ties between the two countries and convey a message of gratitude to the British Armed forces for their continuous support and sacrifices in Afghanistan.

Under Jawad's leadership, the Embassy of Afghanistan in London, hosted unprecedented First Afghanistan-UK Business Conference on 17 September 2018 in London, where more than 100 businessperson attended and discussed business opportunities in Afghanistan. Further, the First Afghan British Business Forum a platform for Afghan-led businesses to connect, to expand and to strengthen their business networks in London was initiated under his leadership. In 2019, The 2nd Afghanistan-UK Business Conference, where five cabinet Ministers participated, was initiated to build on the success of the conference. The aim of the conference was to enhance trade and commerce between the United Kingdom and Afghanistan, while promoting Afghanistan's growing business environment. "At this conference, along with British businessmen who want to invest in Afghanistan, we have also invited Afghan government officials to answer the British businessmen's questions," Jawad said.

== Political views ==
Having lived in Europe and the USA for more than 25 years, Jawad is familiar with western views on society and politics. He has been supportive of the American war on terror and of involvement of women in Afghan politics. Jawad has said that the biggest concern that Afghans have about the international presence is that it might be short-lived.

Jawad has been loyal to President Karzai. He publicly defended Karzai against allegations of corruption and said that he is the most hard-working president Afghanistan has ever had. Nevertheless, in October 2009 he was the first Karzai aide to suggest that a run-off between Karzai and his challenger Abdullah Abdullah was very likely after allegations of election fraud. He said that a power sharing agreement between Karzai and Abdullah would be a good political solution but said he doubted that it would bring more skillful people to the government and that a coalition government meant sacrificing merits.

Jawad and his wife have worked several times with former first lady Laura Bush in promoting awareness of rights for Afghan woman and children. However Jawad criticized the Bush administration sometimes on using so much aerial bombing, resulting in civilian casualties, Jawad has expressed his gratitude to the US and foreign military powers in Afghanistan on a large number of occasions. Towards President Obama, who was less supportive of Afghan President Karzai, Jawad was more critical: "When the new administration came in there were a lot of changes and sometimes there was an oversimplification of the issues. Now the Obama administration is realizing you cannot just get rid of a democratically elected president of a country because you don't really like him." he said to United Press International. Further Jawad has voiced opposition to President Obama's plan to begin withdrawing troops from Afghanistan starting summer 2011. Jawad stressed the importance of continued international presence to avoid a situation as in the early 90s.

Jawad has stressed that too much of the international aid and military effort had bypassed the Afghan government which makes it impossible to build competent government and security. Jawad also has said that eradication of poppies is not the best solution to the Afghan narcotics problem. In May 2005 Jawad signed a memorandum of understanding for the city of light, a large reconstruction plan for the center of Kabul.

Jawad has criticized Pakistan for not doing enough to stop the Taliban insurgency. Although he recognizes that new Pakistani President Asif Ali Zardari seems much more committed to battling terrorism than his predecessor, General Pervez Musharraf. But, according to Jawad, Pakistan's army still appears to be more preoccupied with the country's traditional nemesis, India.

In November 2013, Jawad participated with the Loya Jirga in Kabul to discuss and offer his insights on the status and terms of the Bilateral Security Agreement, the Presidential elections and political transition, as well as the international community's level of economic assistance, military engagement and jurisdiction for operating foreign troops in the country up to and post-2014. He is also a longstanding member of India-Pakistan- Afghanistan Dialogue, a track one and half confidence building forum among diplomats and former intelligence officials.

== Awards, Honorary Degrees and International Conferences ==
Awards and honorary degrees granted to Jawad include the Constitutional Loya Jirga Service, Medal, Government of Afghanistan, Kabul, Afghanistan, 2003; Award of Merit for Rebuilding a Nation, American Society for Engineering Education, Washington, D.C, 2004, Honorary Doctorate Degree in Organization Leadership, Argosy University, Washington, D.C. 2007, theSpecial Award for Improving the Quality of Life, Washington, DC, 2007 and the Global Citizen Award, Roots of Peace, Washington, D.C., 2008.

In his role as Senior Political and Foreign Policy Advisor to the Chief Executive of Afghanistan, Ambassador Jawad was a key participant in the US Afghanistan Dialogue at Camp David, which was hosted by Secretary of State John Kerry on March 23, 2015. Jawad attended the event as part of the Afghan Delegation, which consisted of Afghanistan's President, Chief Executive Officer, and other high ranking Government officials.

Ambassador Jawad was selected by the U.S Department of Commerce to participate in the World Economic Forum on the Middle East and North Africa. He attended and contributed to the Forum in Amman, Jordan from 21–23 May 2015.

Ambassador Jawad attended the fifth anniversary of the Concordia Summit held in New York City on October 1 and 2, 2015. The Concordia Summit convened the world's preeminent leaders and decision makers to address the world's most pressing global challenges and emphasised the need for effective cross-sector collaboration to lead to a more prosperous and sustainable future. Jawad attended and contributed to the Summit as an active Concordia member.

Ambassador Jawad has attended and been a key contributor to various Halifax International Security Forums, most recently the one which convened on the 20–23 November 2015. The forum served as a platform for various international leaders, diplomats, and security professionals to comment on and assess the change in the increased threat level in the global landscape.

The International Development Law Organization (IDLO) hosted Ambassador Jawad at their headquarters in Rome, as an honored guest and key contributor to their Assembly of Parties. He contributed to the Organization's internal review regarding the best platform to approach rule of law and development in various countries, including work specifically in Afghanistan.

Ambassador Jawad participated in the NATO Summit on Afghanistan on July 8 and 9, 2016 in Warsaw, Poland, along with Afghanistan's Chief Executive Abdullah Abdullah and President Ashraf Ghani. At this summit, NATO reaffirmed its commitment to and confirmed funding for the Afghan National Defense and Security Forces until at least the end of 2020.

As Senior Political and Foreign Policy Advisor, Ambassador Jawad accompanied the Chief Executive of Afghanistan, Dr. Abdullah, to the World Humanitarian Summit held in Istanbul, Turkey, May 23 and 24, 2016.

Ambassador Jawad also participated at the London Conference on Afghanistan on December 4, 2014, in London, United Kingdom, where the conference provided a platform for the government of Afghanistan to set out its vision for reform and for the international community to demonstrate enduring solidarity and support for Afghanistan.

On April 30, 2019, Jawad received the 2019 Diplomat of the year award.

In 2022 Ambassador Said Tayeb Jawad received the distinction and honorary title of Academician in a ceremony hosted at the State Duma by the Russian Municipal Academy.

== See also ==
- Diplomatic missions of Afghanistan
- United States-Afghanistan relations
- Politics of Afghanistan

== Publications ==
- Afghanistan: Realities of War and Rebuilding. Ilead Academy, 2006. ISBN 978-0-9774211-1-4
- The First Flamenco in Samangan, published in English, Persian and Pashto by Amiri Publications, Kabul, 2020. ISBN 978-9936-652-51-4
- Be a Provider of Relief, not an Inquisitor of Belief (Dari). Amiri Publications, Kabul, 2019

Diplomatic posts
Preceded by Ishaq Sharhyar	Ambassador of Afghanistan to the United States; 2003–2010	Succeeded by Eklil Ahmad Hakimi
