= Lookalike audience =

Digital marketing concept

A lookalike audience is a group of social network members who are determined as sharing characteristics with another group of members. In digital advertising, it refers to a targeting tool for digital marketing, first initiated by Facebook, which helps to reach potential customers online who are likely to share similar interests and behaviors with existing customers. Since Facebook debuted this feature in 2013, additional advertising platforms have followed suit, including Google Ads, Outbrain, Taboola, LinkedIn Ads and others.

== Considerations ==
Lookalike audiences anatomize existing customers and their user profiles to find the commonalities between the existing audience. This helps to find highly-qualified customers who previously would have been difficult to identify and reach. This expands the potential audience in different countries and applies to new differentiated audience segments; This approach saves time and lowers advertising costs for the acquisition of a new audience.

In order to be effective, a lookalike audience seed needs to be homogeneous. This is commonly achieved using a consistent behavioral pattern. The homogeneity of the lookalike seed has a greater influence on the audience's effectiveness than the size of this sample group. In Facebook, the minimal lookalike seed size is 100 users from the same country. Facebook generally recommends creating a seed from an audience of 1,000 to 5,000 users.

Lookalike audiences might have limited effects on small companies or startups because of the small sample size of their existing audience, which would inevitably lead to insufficient data drawn from the current audience and interference from outliers. Namely, there would be no high bounce rate with these companies' websites.

== Examples of seeds ==
Marketers use many data sources to create lookalike seeds. Some examples of eCommerce lookalike seeds include:

- CRM-based – A seed based on an email or phone number list of customers who have had a past interaction with the business. This can be further segmented, for example customers with the highest lifetime value or past purchases of a specific product.
- Conversion-based – A seed based on users that have performed an action such as a Purchase or Lead form submission on the website.
- Engagement-based – A seed based on users segmented by their engagement, such as pages viewed, time spent on the site, video views, etc.

== Methodology ==
Facebook, as an example, takes three steps to build a lookalike audience:

- Choose the audience seed to build a lookalike audience from. This can range from page fans, visitors to the website, and customer lists etc. Generally the base audience should be composed of a minimum of 500 people. Larger pools will increase the accuracy of the lookalike audience.
- Choose the specific location (country or region) to find a similar audience in.
- Customize the audience size. Facebook offers a range of percentiles from 1% to 10%, indicating the size of the combined population of the locations selected. Larger audiences provide a wider reach, but a smaller lookalike audience is more targeted, which means ads are seen by fewer people, but they are likely to be better aligned to the features of the audience's seed.

== Underlying Technology ==
Lookalike audience tools rely on machine learning techniques to identify similarities between users at scale. Common approches include distance-based clustering, keyword-based models and classification algorithms, which are applied to large datasets of user behavioral and demographic signals to score individuals by their similarity to the seed audience. The accuracy of these models is influenced by both the volume and quality of the available training data, with larger and more representative seed audiences generally producing more reliable results.

== Debate ==
One study has shown that the tool of lookalike audiences, to some degrees, does well in generally advertising results. It is also listed as an important trend of pay-per-click (PPC) by Delhi School of Internet Marketing. However, debates over such a third party behavioral targeting being used for digital marketing hasn't stopped either, because using the data of customers is against online privacy settings.

In 2019, limitations were put in place by Facebook to stop discriminatory targeting of audiences according to zip code, income levels and demographics (age and gender). In June 2022, the U.S. Justice Department Civil Rights Division filed a lawsuit in the Southern New York U.S. District Court against Meta Platforms alleging that the Lookalike audience tool for targeted advertising on Facebook discriminates against users based on their race, color, religion, sex, disability, familial status, and national origin in its distribution of housing advertisements in violation of Title VIII of the Civil Rights Act of 1968. Meta Platforms settled with the Justice Department on the same day the lawsuit was filed.

== See also ==
- E-marketing collateral
