= Fraley (surname) =

Fraley is a surname. Notable people with the surname include:

- Frederick Fraley (1804–1901), American businessman and politician
- Gerry Fraley (1954–2019), American sportswriter
- Hank Fraley (born 1977), American football player
- Jake Fraley (born 1995), American baseball player
- Jamie Fraley (born 1986), American woman missing since 2008
- Oscar Fraley (1914–1994), American author
- Pat Fraley (born 1949), American voice actor
