= Fraley syndrome =

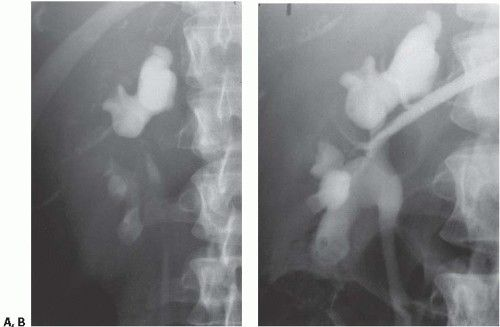
- Fraley syndrome

Fraley syndrome is a condition where the superior infundibulum of the upper calyx of the kidney is obstructed by the crossing renal (upper or middle section) artery branch, causing distension and dilatation of the calyx and presenting clinically as haematuria and nephralgia (ipsilateral flank pain). Furthermore, when the renal artery obstructs the proximal collecting system, filling defects can occur anywhere in the calyces, pelvis, or ureter.

The condition was first described in the New England Journal of Medicine by urologist Elwin E. Fraley in December 1966.

While this is a rare disorder, most cases are asymptomatic. When complications do arise, it can be treated surgically after testing is done to identify the renal vasculature that is impacting renal output. Another possible cause for similar hydronephrosis is megacalicosis, for which surgery is considered inappropriate.

== Signs and symptoms ==
The signs and symptoms of this disorder can vary from asymptomatic microhematuria to severe, recurrent flank pain associated with kidney stone formation and infections. Patients may also present with a fever, nausea, vomiting, dysuria and polyuria. If untreated, the chronic infections can progress causing renal damage.

== Cause ==
The symptoms are caused when the individual has an anatomically low lying kidney. This is known as ptosis of the kidney. This occurs normally on the right side, but bilateral involvement is possible. The reason that the right side is more commonly affected is because the vasculature on this side tends to be longer due to the positioning of the aorta, which lies slightly left of the midline. The renal vessels may then drape over a portion of the superior infundibulum causing compression, and ultimately partial obstruction to the superior calyces. When the obstruction occurs, distension of the calyx, which is known as hydronephrosis, leads to the clinical presentation of the disorder.

== Pathophysiology ==
When a blood vessel, usually the renal artery, crosses over the superior infundibulum of the kidney (one or both), fluid begins to build up, causing the calyx to become distended. This stretching allows the backed up fluid to be more evenly distributed, which can slow the amount of damage done on the kidney. Within this area, the ability to remove waste and maintain mineral and fluid balance become impaired. This leads to an increased risk of infection and stone formation, often causing flank pain. Furthermore, infections can cause further inflammation of the lining of the urinary tract; enough to cause blood to appear in the urine. Thickening of the walls of the calyces can interrupt blood flow, and eventually lead to tissue damage if untreated. This damaged tissue may be replaced by fibrous scar tissue. Kidney scarring can lead to high blood pressure.

== Diagnosis ==
The diagnosis is made depending on the clinical presentation of the patient. For patients that present with the classical symptoms of the disorder, specifically flank pain and hematuria, the initial tests include a urinalysis and complete blood count. Next, imaging of the affected side includes an ultrasound or CT scan of the kidney. Both of these tests would show the distension of the affected kidney. To confirm the diagnosis, a CT angiogram can be performed, which would track the vascular path over the kidney, showing that a vessel is obstructing the superior calyces. Alternatively, a physician may perform a cystoscopy with a retrograde pyelogram, which would demonstrate the level of the obstruction and rule out nephrolithiasis. For those individuals that do not present with any symptoms, hematuria may be found on an urinalysis when coming in for a routine physical. Since hematuria, to any degree, is an abnormal finding, this would lead to further imaging to diagnose its cause. This imaging would be a CT scan or a renal ultrasound, which would show evidence of hydronephrosis, and lead to the same diagnostic path as those with the classic signs and symptoms.

== Treatment ==
Once the diagnosis has been made, the treatment for this disorder is a partial nephrectomy involving the affected calyces. This relieves the obstruction, but leads to the loss of nephrons and renal function. With newer microscopic techniques, surgeons are now able to re-route the renal vasculature and relieve the compression on the affected calyces, while sparing the nephrons and renal function. This technique is known as Fraley's infundibulopyelostomy.

== Prognosis ==
The expected outcome for patients with this disorder is generally good. Today's surgical techniques are nearly always effective at relieving the obstruction, thus curing the individual. Consequently, there are some risks that come with having a surgical procedure done, which would need to be discussed with the attending physician. If left untreated, this disorder may result in chronic infections. Most people can function with one working kidney, so if kidney failure occurs it may not impact the overall health of the individual. However, this is a rare occurrence and surgical intervention is almost always performed before this occurs. Most patients with this disorder do well and have no long-term problems after treatment.

== Research ==
Due to the fact that Fraley Syndrome is caused by a rare anatomical abnormality, current research revolves around treatment methods. There have been descriptions of nephron-sparing approaches such as infundibulo-infundibulostomy, infundibulo-pyelostomy, infundibuloplasty with vasculopexy, vasculopexy with nephropexy, and ligation of a branch of the posterior segmentary artery. In 2016, a laparoscopic approach was used to treat an individual with Fraley Syndrome. Specifically, a laparoscopic YV-infundibulo-pyeloplasty with vasculopexy of a posterior segmental renal artery was performed. The results were a less invasive, and the surgeon was able to view structures under magnification. Additionally, in 2018, a laparoscopic calycectomy was performed without clamping of renal branches. This allowed for the preservation of renal tissue, and thereby preserving arterial flow to avoid parenchymal ischemia.

== See also ==
- Hydronephrosis
