= E-marketing collateral =

Basic internet tactical activity

Similar to marketing collateral definition, e-marketing collateral is the collection of basic internet tactical activities that supports the marketing of a product or a service on the internet. These basic tactics are intended to support, facilitate and ease the internet presence of a website, product or a service.

These activities enforced themselves as givens nowadays, common e-marketing collateral include:

- Building the e-presence; whether it is a website, blog, microsite or a portal.
- Search engine marketing, including search engine optimization and search engine registration. With the prevalence of mobile devices, e-marketing collateral must often be targeted towards mobile devices and localized search.
- Online directories registration.
- Social media accounts setup and social media optimization.

Original e-commerce marketing: Web sites Display ads Measures “eyeballs” and impressions of display ads

Social, mobile, local e-commerce marketing: Social media: Facebook, Twitter, Pinterest Mobile, localized ads and apps, geo-location Measures “conversations” and “engagement”.

In 2014, 135 billion dollars were spent by marketers on new online marketing collateral.
