= Camp of Fire =

Organisation based in Nairobi

Camp of Fire is a slum development programme in Nairobi, Kenya initiated by Slum Dwellers International, where established slum-dwellers have promised to build proper houses, schools, and community centers without any government money, in return for land they have been illegally squatting on for 30 years.
