= City of Light Development =

Urban reconstruction plan in Afghanistan

The Kabul - City Of Light Development is an urban reconstruction plan, first proposed by urban planner and architect Hisham N. Ashkouri to revitalize the capital city of Afghanistan. The plan targets an area just south of the Kabul River for redevelopment. This area, approximately 3.5km long and 1.75 km wide, still hosts residences, commercial and retail activity, despite the fact that it has been largely reduced to rubble after years of occupation and civil war, and many of the collapsed structures have become temporary shelters constructed of whatever is available, without building codes or standards. The plan will revitalize Meywand Avenue, one of the main avenues of commerce in the city and part of the historic Silk Route, between the Shah Do Shamshera Mosque and the Id Gah Mosque. Retail, business, and residential areas are planned, alongside preserved and restored structures of historic value. Also incorporated into this project is the new Afghan National Museum.

== Design ==
The design of the City of Light is based on an "Arid Region Design Technique" that has proven itself over the past decades in cities such as Istanbul, Baghdad, Isfahan, and Kabul. The project will rely on extensive use of concrete, in high-rise and national structures including all-exterior solar screen work.

10% of the development's profit will be set aside for seed money to encourage refurbishment of nearby homes and businesses.

The bases of the aesthetic designs to be used are rooted in the rich history of Afghan jewelry and rug designs. The buildings assembled in this project are most adaptable to various design themes, especially with the exterior glass skin being set within an outside screen of colored concrete in the shape of women's jewelry and rug patterns, extrapolated from culturally significant Afghan images. Green space in the plan is also incorporated in the shape of Necklace Park, a greenway running through the development.

== Progress ==
A Memorandum of Understanding has been signed with Afghan Ambassador to the United States Said Tayeb Jawad for greater development of this plan, and it was presented to President Hamid Karzai in May 2005.

== See also ==
- Kabul
- Hisham N. Ashkouri
- Afghan National Museum
