= Fraley v. Facebook, Inc. =

Class action lawsuit

Fraley et al. v. Facebook, Inc., et al.
- Court: United States District Court for the Northern District of California
- Full case name: Angel Fraley, et al. v. Facebook, Inc. and Does 1-100
- Citations: no. 11-CV-01726 (N.D. Cal., filed Apr. 4, 2011)

Fraley, et al. v. Facebook, Inc., et al. is a class action lawsuit filed in California against Facebook alleging misappropriation of Facebook users' names and likenesses in advertisements called "Sponsored Stories". The case resulted in the parties reaching a settlement. Settlement checks in the amount of $15 were distributed to class members beginning in November 2016.

== Procedural history ==
The lawsuit was once filed in California superior court on March 11, 2011. Facebook removed the case to the United States District Court for the Northern District of California, where it was assigned to Judge Lucy H. Koh.

Among other procedural motions, Facebook filed a motion to dismiss the case. On December 16, 2011, Judge Koh granted in part and denied in part Facebook's motion. The order denied all significant aspects of Facebook's motion, thereby allowing Plaintiffs to continue the case towards class certification.

In May 2012, one week before the hearing on the motion for class certification, and just after Facebook began selling stock to the public, the parties reached an initial settlement. The settlement proposed US$10 million would be allocated to 10 non-profits involved in privacy and advertising research and education and outreach with regard to social media, and created various changes to Facebook's interface whereby users could have more control over their appearances in advertisements. The settlement also allowed Plaintiffs' attorneys to seek court approval of up to $10 million in fees without opposition from Facebook.

Judge Koh recused herself from the case one day before the motion for preliminary approval of the settlement was to be heard. The case was reassigned to Judge Richard G. Seeborg. In August 2012, Judge Seeborg heard the motion, and denied it. Seeborg took issue with the "[p]ropriety of a settlement that provides no monetary relief directly to class members", how the parties arrived at a payment of $10 million, and the "clear sailing" provision allowing Plaintiffs attorneys to request up to $10 million from the court, unopposed by Facebook.

== Settlement ==
The parties revised the settlement, addressing the Judge's primary concerns regarding how the settlement amount was determined, removing the "clear sailing" agreement provision such that Facebook could now oppose Plaintiff attorneys' fee request, and, significantly, included clearer language regarding the ability of minors, as well as their parents, to prevent minors from appearing in advertisements.

Facebook agreed to a deal in which they would:

- Provide a mechanism whereby users can discover if they are appearing in Sponsored Stories advertisements
- Provide a mechanism whereby users can prevent the future appearance in advertisements by that advertiser
- Change the terms of use, known as the "Statement of Rights and Responsibilities", to inform users they can be used in Sponsored Stories
- Give parents control over whether their minor children appear in any advertisements at all
- Give minors the ability to completely opt out of all advertisements while they are minors
- Allow affected users to file a claim that may result in an award of $10

On December 3, 2012, Judge Richard Seeborg preliminarily approved the Amended Settlement Agreement submitted by the parties.

On January 2, 2013, notices of the proposed settlement began to go out to approximately 125,000,000 Facebook users whom Facebook had identified as potentially being in the class. The class was defined as:

All persons in the United States who have or have had a Facebook account at any time and had their names, nicknames, pseudonyms, profile pictures, photographs, likenesses, or identities displayed in a Sponsored Story at any time on or before the date of entry of the Preliminary Approval Order.

Additionally, a Minor Subclass was also defined as:

All persons in the Class who additionally have or have had a Facebook account at any time and had their names, nicknames, pseudonyms, profile pictures, photographs, likenesses, or identities displayed in a Sponsored Story, while under eighteen (18) years of age, or under any other applicable age of majority, at any time on or before the date of entry of the Preliminary Approval Order.

The proposed settlement created a Settlement Fund of $20 million. From that amount, court-determined attorneys fees, costs, and class administration costs will be deducted. The remaining amount is to be divided among the class members who file valid claim forms. If too many people file claims and the amount per person is significantly diminished, the settlement proposes to divide the Settlement Fund, less other deductions, among named non-profits which ostensibly are involved with, and will use the money for, the public good regarding social media education and outreach as it relates to advertising, minors, and privacy, in accordance with the cy pres doctrine of the American legal system.

The Court held a Fairness Hearing in San Francisco on June 28, 2013. Subsequently, Judge Seeborg approved the Final Approval of Settlement Agreement, and each Claimant who filed a Claim is receiving $15.

== See also ==
- List of class-action lawsuits
- Lawsuits involving Meta Platforms
