= Hisham Munir =

Iraqi architect (born 1930)

- هشام منير
- Born: February 11, 1930 (age 95); Baghdad, Mandatory Iraq
- Education: American University of Beirut, University of Texas at Austin School of Architecture, University of Southern California

Hisham A. Munir (Arabic: هشام منير) is an Iraqi architect known for pioneering architectural modernism in Iraq.

== Early life ==
Hisham A. Munir was born in February, 1930 in Baghdad, Mandatory Iraq. He studied at the American University of Beirut, University of Texas at Austin School of Architecture, and University of Southern California, finishing his education in 1956.

== Career ==
In 1959 Munir established Iraq's first architecture program at the University of Baghdad with Mohamed Makiya and Abdullah Ihsan Kamel.

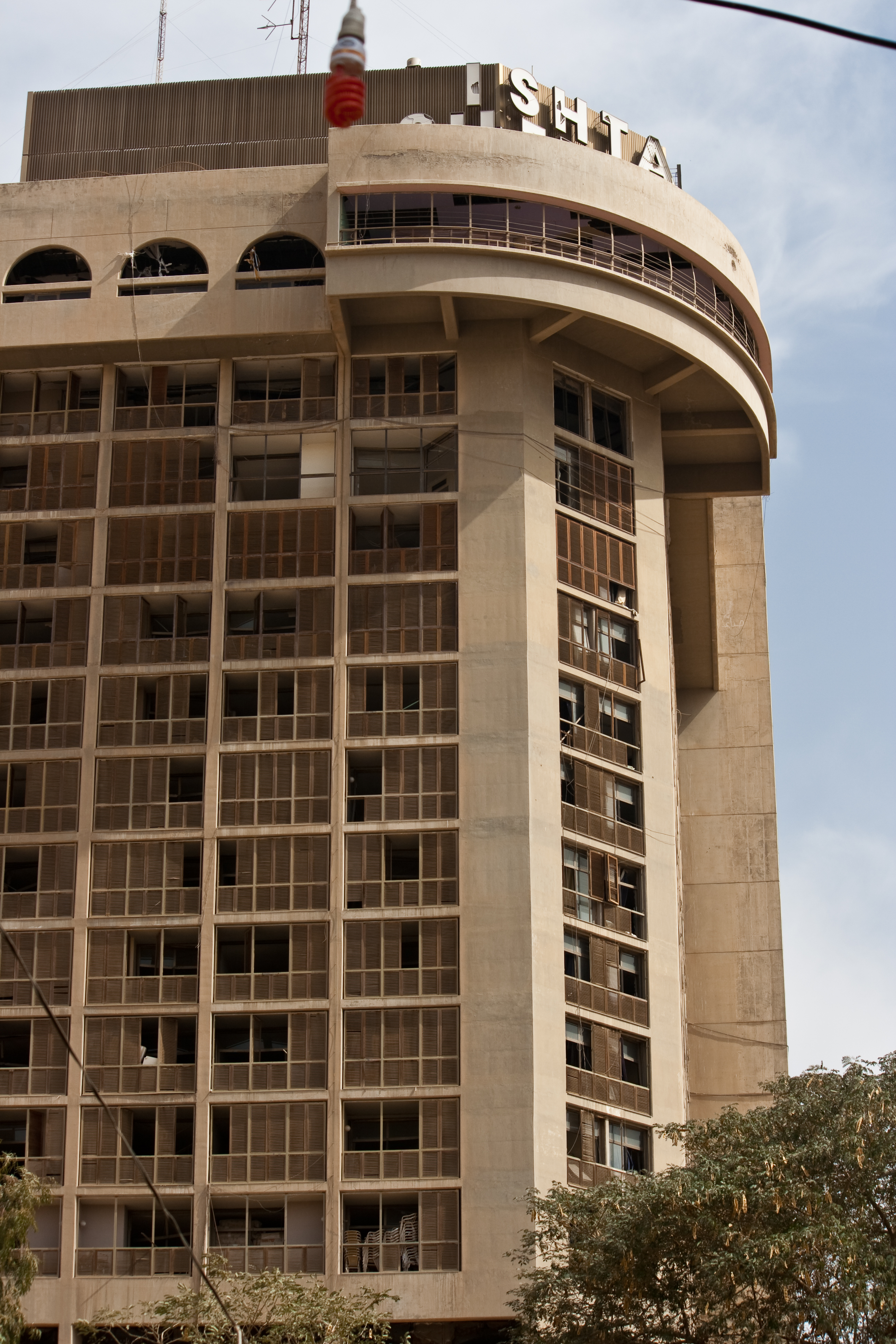
Ishtar Sheraton Hotel & Casino in Baghdad (1982)

In 1957 Munir worked with German architect Walter Gropius and his firm, The Architects Collaborative, in the design of the campus of the University of Baghdad. Munir designed a number of major projects in the following three decades including the University of Mosul campus (1966), Iraqi Ministry of Interior (1974), Baghdad City Hall (1975), and Ishtar Sheraton Hotel & Casino in Baghdad (1982).

== Awards and honours ==
In 2017, Hisham received the Tamayouz Excellence Award for Lifetime Achievement.
