= Ouellette v. Viacom International Inc. =

US legal case

Ouellette v. Viacom
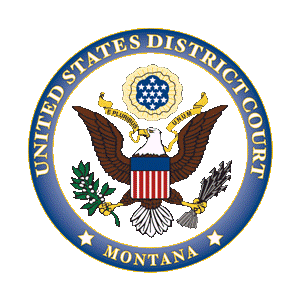
- Court: United States District Court for the District of Montana (Missoula)
- Full case name: Ouellette v. Viacom International Inc. et al
- Decided: March 31, 2011
- Docket nos.: 9:10-cv-00133
- Citation: 2011 WL 1882780

Case history
- Subsequent actions: Donald W. Molloy's order adopting the magistrate judge's findings; 2011 WL 1883190

Holding
- Service providers had no liability for taking down videos that may have been fair uses. The court also found no liability for online service providers who do not meet the needs of disabled persons.

Court membership
- Judge sitting: Jeremiah C. Lynch

Keywords
- American Disabilities Act (ADA) (42 U.S.C. § 12182(a)); DMCA; Safe harbor (17 U.S.C. § 512)

Ouellette v. Viacom, No. 9:10-cv-00133; 2011 WL 1882780, found the safe harbor provision of the Digital Millennium Copyright Act (DMCA) did not create liability for service providers that take down non-infringing works (works having a fair use defense to copyright infringement). This case limited the claims that can be filed against service providers by establishing immunity for service providers' takedown of fair use material, at least from grounds under the DMCA. The court left open whether another "independent basis of liability" could serve as legal grounds for an inappropriate takedown.

The court's opinion was also noteworthy in its treatment of the Americans with Disabilities Act (ADA), holding that online service providers were not liable for failure to provide accommodations to persons with disabilities unless their service is "tightly integrated" with a physical space.

== Facts ==
The case began when Plaintiff Todd Ouellette filed his complaint without an attorney (pro se). He claimed that YouTube and Myspace had wrongfully taken down his homemade videos. Plaintiff asked for $9,999,000 in damages. Defendants replied that the videos violated copyright. Plaintiff further alleged that the videos were fair use and that defendants' refusal to put them back up was in violation of the DMCA takedown provisions. Plaintiff alleged that removal of the videos did not comply with the DMCA's established procedure. 17 U.S.C. § 512 of the DMCA grants safe harbor (immunity) to service providers that follow the DMCA's takedown procedure.

The plaintiff sent counter notices to defendants that he alleged were complete except for minor errors due to his dyslexia. He contended that the failure to restore the videos shows a violation of the Americans with Disabilities Act (ADA) by depriving him of his "right to fair access to [Defendants'] 'public accommodation'" (arguing that the services constituted an "online theater"). He also claimed that these websites did not comply with the ADA by having text and formatting impossible for him to read as a dyslexic person, particularly in the Terms of Service. He mentioned that there was no audio version to help him navigate either YouTube or Myspace. The Court waived the normal fees for filing the action because the plaintiff was unable to pay them (In Forma Pauperis under 28 U.S.C. § 1915).

== Legal analysis ==
Judges give a plaintiff in a proceeding without a lawyer the benefit of the doubt, but the plaintiff must still have a valid underlying cause of action.

=== DMCA ===
The court found fair use to be irrelevant to a determination of whether defendant violated the DMCA. According to 17 U.S.C. § 107, fair use is only an affirmative defense to a claim of copyright infringement. It is not an affirmative right on which a cause of action may be premised. Thus, fair use does not protect the right to engage in any particular use of another's copyrighted material.

The court found that the DMCA did not create liability for service providers. The court reviewed the legislative history of Congress' enactment of the DMCA and found that the goal of the legislation was "to limit the liability of internet service providers, not to create liability that could not otherwise be imposed under existing law independent of the DMCA." The statutory intent is to make it easier for service providers to know what opens the door to lawsuits against them for infringement. Additional liability opposes this stated goal.

The safe harbor provision limits internet service providers' liability for copyright infringement. The court found it cannot increase liability. The safe harbor provision cannot be used as a premise for liability, because not meeting the safe harbor provision is not by itself sufficient for liability. The only affirmative cause of action in 17 U.S.C. § 512 is 512(f) which permits a claim for knowingly materially misrepresenting that a work is infringing. However, the defendants never made any determination of whether plaintiffs' videos constituted fair use, let alone knowingly made representations to the plaintiff that it was infringing. Thus, there was no underlying cause of action for the plaintiff's claims.

=== ADA ===
42 U.S.C. § 12182(a) of ADA provides that "No individual shall be discriminated against on the basis of disability in the full and equal enjoyment of the goods, services, facilities, privileges, advantages, or accommodations of any place of public accommodation by any person who owns, leases (or leases to), or operates a place of public accommodation." However, the ADA does not apply to private websites that do not constitute "places of public accommodation." The court found that Myspace and YouTube were not places of public accommodation. They were not actual, physical places, and they did not have an equivalent actual, physical place beyond the web "where the public gets those goods or services". Thus, the court found the ADA rules did not apply to the defendants.

The plaintiff failed not just in establishing a connection between the defendants' internet services and a physical place, but failed to establish that the defendants had any physical location for making their services available at all. The court held that impeding access to an "online theater" is not an injury within the scope of the ADA.

Even if the company does some business in person, its online site is not necessarily a place of public accommodation. Southwest Airlines' online site was earlier held not to constitute a place of public accommodation. However, if the site is "tightly integrated with a physical store" then ADA protection likely applies. Target's online shopping is still a place of public accommodation because it mirrors the functionality of their physical stores. Thus, retail websites and other companies that have online presences that closely track the function of their physical stores will have to comply with the ADA.

Finding no valid claims for relief remaining, the court dismissed the complaint.
