= Racial steering =

Practice by real estate brokers

Racial steering refers to the practice in which real estate brokers guide prospective home buyers towards or away from certain neighborhoods based on their race. The term is used in the context of de facto residential segregation in the United States, and is often divided into two broad classes of conduct:

1. Advising customers to purchase homes in particular neighborhoods on the basis of race.
2. Failing, on the basis of race, to show, or to inform buyers of homes that meet their specifications.

== Overview ==
Historically the United States has been defined by racially segregated neighborhoods. Urban planning up to the 1960s has been documented as one of the causes of this phenomenon. Urban planners have been seen to have practiced early forms of racial steering. Through the use of the restrictive covenant, and the establishment of zoning laws between World War I and World War II, and the use of urban renewal between the 1940s and 1960s, urban planners have aided in the development of racially segregated neighborhoods. After the 1960s, through in part by the Civil Rights Movement, planning efforts were focused more towards advocacy, and community development, rather than maintaining segregation. Although planning practices did change, the racial make-up of neighborhoods did not.

== History ==
=== Theoretical explanations ===
Researchers have attempted to explain the racial segregation seen in neighborhoods throughout the United States. There are three leading theories. The first "asserts that the phenomenon is really self – segregation, the result of the preferences of blacks, as with other ethnics, to live in segregated neighborhoods. The second suggests that poverty, aided by the inertia of history has perpetuated segregation. The third suggests that the decline of blatant discrimination of the past has revealed pervasive institutional racism." John E. Farley, argues that although it is plausible for each of these theories to contribute to the segregation seen, his research lends the most support to the second theory, which bases itself on social class. Farley states that "class largely determines what housing people can afford to rent or buy, and since the gap between whites and African Americans is wide with respect to income (U.S. Census Bureau 2001) and even wider with respect to wealth", there tends to be people with similar incomes and wealth in the same areas. Diana Pearce, another researcher, contributes the segregation seen in neighborhoods throughout the United States to institutional racism. She argues that "in [the] consumers' eyes, real estate agents (compared to bankers or builders, for example) are frequently seen as the most expert in nearly every aspect of decision making involved in buying a house." She continues that "as a group they are not only experts, they also control access to housing areas. They are, or can be, community gatekeepers ... and a crucial aspect of the gatekeeper role is the screening of potential residents."

=== Federal laws ===
The United States congress passed a series of Acts aimed at combating segregation. The first such act, The Civil Rights Act of 1866, states in subsections 1981, 1981a, and 1982 that all persons born in the United States are citizens regardless of their race, color, or previous condition and as citizens they could make and enforce contracts, sue and be sued, give evidence in court, and inherit, purchase, lease, sell, hold, and convey real estate and personal property. Although this act was passed, it was never enforced on the local, state or national level. A second act, The Civil Rights Act of 1964, through Title VI outlawed segregation in public schools and public places. It also made it illegal to have segregation of the races in schools, housing, or hiring. Like the first act, powers given to enforce it were weak in the beginning, but were later supplemented. A third act, the Civil Rights Act of 1968, subsection 3604, expanded on the Civil Rights Act of 1866. It prohibited discrimination concerning the sale, rental, and financing of housing based on race, religion, national origin, and sex. This section is also referred to as the Fair Housing Act. This act is enforced at the national level by the Office of Fair Housing and Equal Opportunity at the United States Department of Housing and Urban Development.

=== Movement organizations ===
Throughout the past four decades since the passage of the Civil Rights Act of 1968, many people have come together to movement organizations that fight racial discrimination in the housing market. One such organization is the National Fair Housing Alliance. It credits itself "as being the only national organization that is dedicated solely to ending discrimination in housing". In the Greater New York City Metropolitan Area, there are seven local member organizations they are the Fair Housing Council of Central New York, Fair Housing Enforcement Project, Long Island Housing Services, Housing Opportunities Made Equal, Westchester Residential Opportunities, Fair Housing Council of Northern New Jersey, and the Connecticut Fair Housing Center. A second organization is the Fair Housing Law. They are leading a campaign to "increase public awareness of the Fair Housing Act, and its protections". A third organization, The National Fair Housing Advocate, aims itself as being "designed to serve both the fair housing community and the general public with timely news and information regarding the issues of housing discrimination". Each of these organizations share a common theme, bringing up class action lawsuits against people and/ or companies who fail to rent or sell to others based on their race.

=== Lawsuits ===
Since the enacting of federal laws and the emergence of movement organizations, there have been several lawsuits brought up against individuals and companies for racial discrimination.

1. Realty Forum vs. New York State Attorney General (1988): This case involves the New York State Attorney General suing a Yonkers Real – Estate agency, The Realty Forum in 1988 with racial steering. The Attorney General accused the firm of "providing listings of apartments in particular neighborhoods based solely on a client's race or color". The Attorney General began investigating the Realty Forum after receiving complaints from the Westchester Residential Opportunities. The Realty Forum has since been found guilty.
2. Corcoran Group vs. New York State Attorney General (2006): This case involves the New York State Attorney General suing a real estate brokerage in Brooklyn Heights, New York City with racial steering. The National Fair Housing Alliance following up on a past report found "literal and blatant sales steering... where the agent applied a new trick – he used a map to tell whites instead where they should 'flee to.'" The alliance then referred the case to the New York State Attorney General which subsequently placed charges against the group. The case is still pending.
3. Coldwell Banker vs Illinois Attorney General (2006): This case involves a Chicago real estate company being accused of racially steering prospective homebuyers by the Illinois Attorney General. The agency was first investigated by the National Fair Housing Alliance in late 2005. The alliance in their report accused the agency of "blatant discrimination...against African Americans". The alliance continues that white prospective home buyers were shown 36 listings while African Americans who were better qualified were shown only seven. The company denies any wrongdoing and the lawsuit is still pending.
4. Century 21 Town and Country Vs. The Michigan Department of Civil Rights (MDCR) (2006): This case involves the Michigan Department of Civil Rights suing the Century 21 Town and Country of discrimination. The department issued these charges after receiving complaints of illegal steering of white homebuyers to predominantly white neighborhoods and African American homebuyers to predominantly African American neighborhoods. The complaints were initiated by the National Fair Housing Alliance after their investigation which concluded in July 2005. The case is still pending.
5. United States v. Meta Platforms Inc. (2022): On June 21, 2022, the U.S. Justice Department Civil Rights Division filed a lawsuit in the Southern New York U.S. District Court against Meta Platforms alleging that the company's Lookalike audience tool for targeted advertising on Facebook discriminates against users based on their race, color, religion, sex, disability, familial status, and national origin in its distribution of housing advertisements in violation of Title VIII of the Civil Rights Act of 1968. Meta Platforms settled with the Justice Department on the same day the lawsuit was filed.

Although individual firms have been accused of racial steering throughout the United States and found guilty, researchers point out that there have however been no accusations that would affect a significant amount of the United States population. Diana Pearce states that since "the passage of federal legislation and a landmark Supreme Court decision, there has not been one large lawsuit about housing... in contrast [to] school desegregation and employment discrimination, where ... laws and court decisions have had comparatively more impact". She continues that "as long as it is assumed in the general legislation and as long as lawyers and judges assume generally that the problem in housing discrimination is that of a few homeowners (or real estate agents who step out of line), practices ... will continue to perpetuate housing segregation".

== Debate ==
The notion of "a debate over racial steering" does not suggest that racial steering is lawful in the US. Under US civil rights law, racial steering to create or maintain segregation is unlawful and has been the target of civil rights reform since at least the mid-20th century. Racial or ethnic minorities suffer significant disadvantages. The discriminated groups have reacted through social enclave construction, sometimes resulting in protected markets and the creation of social capital, notwithstanding exclusion and discrimination.

=== Ripple effect in blighted neighborhoods ===
Racially segregated minority neighborhoods have been labeled as blighted. Characteristics of a blighted neighborhoods include rundown homes, streets strewn with garbage, poor lighting, and high rates of crime. Douglas Massey and Nancy Denton explore this logic in their book "American Apartheid". Massey and Denton focus their research on the effects of residential housing discrimination towards African Americans. They argue that racial segregation of lower income residents, who are only capable of making ends meet, creates a neighborhood that is characterized as going "downhill". Massey and Denton argue that this occurs because of a downward spiral effect. If one homeowner cannot afford to maintain their property and allows it to become run down, other homeowners in the area will be less inclined to invest money into their own property. Massey and Denton also point out that "at some point, a threshold is crossed, beyond which the pattern becomes self – reinforcing and irreversible".

=== Academic achievement and racial segregation ===
Racially segregated minority neighborhoods have been associated with having low academic achievement rates. Rumberger and Willms have explored the topic and argue that segregation contributes to minority underachievement in at least two ways. Firstly, students in segregated schools may receive a poor quality of education because schools serving minorities or low socioeconomic groups may have lower funding levels, inexperienced teachers, and reduced levels of other resources that contribute to the student's academic achievement. Secondly, Rumsberg and Willms argue that the residential racial segregation leads to schools having the same composition which can directly affect the student's level of academic achievement. They call these differences "contextual effects". Contextual effects are defined as peer interactions and the teaching and learning climate in the school.

Also, Rumsberg and Willms state that once a school is experiencing the effects of racial segregation, it is difficult to reverse them.

=== Crime rate and racial segregation ===
Since the 1980s violent crimes in the United States have been steadily declining. Between 1980 and 1990, the murder rate for the United States fell by 9%, and between 1973 and 1992, the victimization rate of rapes fell by 28%. "Although rates of crime may be going down for the United States generally, they are spirally upward for one specific group of Americans: African Americans." Douglas Massey argues that the rising of African American poverty and the addition of racial segregation produces a sharp increase in the geographic concentration of poverty. He continues by stating that "as poverty is concentrated… all things associated with it are concentrated, including crime… thus… creating an ecological niche characterized by high levels of violence and a high risk of victimization". Furthermore, Massey argues that a person living within this niche becomes violent themselves in an effort to deter potential criminals and increase their chance of survival, thus creating a cycle of African American violence which at some point cannot be reversed.

Low income black communities that have been segregated by social forces through city design have higher levels of criminal activity rates. Different methods when applied help us understand how social forces and urban design segregated black communities from white communities. "Shaw and McKay argued that three structural factors- low economic status, ethnic heterogeneity and residential mobility- led to the disruption of community social organization, which, in turn, accounted for variations in crime and delinquency." Radical geography has been searching for connections between "the truths of how capitalism's political economy structures urban space and the emphasis on the subjective evaluation of safe urban space.". The geographical structure of a city is designed to keep high income communities separate from low income, generally black communities are formed with this structure. This type of segregation tends to increase rates of intra- racial victimization, but decrease rates of inter-racial victimization."

One method of segregating blacks from whites is through 'gated communities' which isolates the high income population from the low income by gating the higher status community with fences or bars. The result of this 'gated' segregation leads to an unmanageable high criminal activity called a 'ghetto' community where "spatial isolation leads to social isolation, which in turn has a variety of negative outcomes including serious crime." Erecting physical barriers such as gates protects the high income community, leaving the black community to be isolated and an island by itself referenced as a 'ghetto' community. This can be referred to as 'Broken Windows', in which a community "sends a signal" that it "does not care about itself" and the community is unable to protect itself from "criminal invasion". By pushing the low income earners out of the gentrified community, the city is creating a large segregated criminal zone within the city.

"This divide has, in turn, produced disparate social worlds, in which the interests, resources, opportunities, and concerns of racial groups located in distinct neighborhoods increasingly diverge, ultimately leading to unequal rates of crime." The ghetto is labeled as an undesirable area to live and the people in that area are labeled the same. "We have also seen that those who commit crimes tend to be from the same groups that are most likely to be victimized." This causes criminal behavior of the people within the area as "greater racial segregation appears to substantially increase violent crimes such as robberies and aggravated assaults." However it could be argued that the area that an underprivileged person lives in dictates the criminal mentality of the individual. "Poor individuals are simply more prone to committing property crimes than are richer individuals." Having so many people displaced into the ghetto region of a city that commit many different types of criminal actives would be a reason why those communities have higher crime rates.

=== Protective markets and racial segregation ===
Racial residential segregation has allowed minority businesses to strive economically. Research has shown that these neighborhoods create a protective market, one that is defined as a specialty that caters to the culturally based tastes of its residents. Research has also shown that ethnic business owners have an insider's knowledge of the clientele that they serve because they themselves are a part of it. With such knowledge, it is said that they have created a protective market, one that will thrive if the ethnic composition of the neighborhood does not change.

=== Ethnic economies and racial segregation ===
Racially segregated neighborhoods have what are called ethnic economies. An ethnic economy is defined as an "immigrant or minority business and employment sector that coexists with the general economy". Smith argues that an ethnic economy helps in several ways. First, it provides jobs for all able–bodied family members. Second, it has been shown that ethnic economies provide more opportunities for homeownership. Finally, the ethnic infrastructure that is built up, will allow for future growth of the community, thus paving the way for new residents.

=== Social networks, social capital, and racial segregation ===
Racially segregated neighborhoods have strong social networks. These networks have been shown to create social capital, which has been linked to having positive effects on minority residents. First, Portes argues that an individual will gain access to power and political positions through the direct and indirect employment of social connections. He continues by stating that this access to power and political positions, allows for social mobility. Second, Portes states that social capital is generated by social networks of relationships and without the reciprocity, trust, and social norms that come with these networks, a resident who is in need would not be given an opportunity to succeed.
