= History of Facebook =

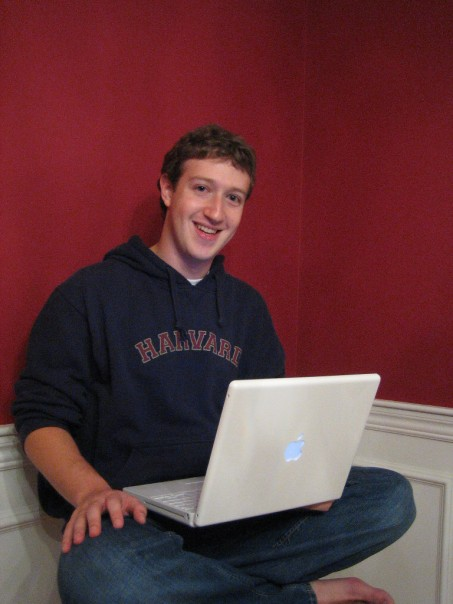
Mark Zuckerberg in 2005

The history of Facebook traces its growth from a college networking site to a global social networking service. It was launched as TheFacebook in 2004, and renamed Facebook in 2005.

Founded by Mark Zuckerberg and his college roommates Eduardo Saverin, Andrew McCollum, Dustin Moskovitz, and Chris Hughes at Harvard University, it was initially limited to Harvard students. It expanded to other colleges in the Boston area, the Ivy League, and gradually most universities in the United States and Canada, corporations, and by 2006 to everyone with a valid email address along with an age requirement of being 13 or older. Facebook introduced key features like the News Feed in 2006, which became central to user engagement. By 2007, Facebook surpassed MySpace in global traffic and became the world's most popular social media platform. The company focused on generating revenue through targeted advertising based on user data, a model that drove its rapid financial growth. In 2012, Facebook went public with one of the largest IPOs in tech history. Acquisitions played a significant role in Facebook's dominance. In 2012, it purchased Instagram, followed by WhatsApp and Oculus VR in 2014, extending its influence beyond social networking into messaging and virtual reality. These moves helped Facebook maintain its position as a leader in the tech industry.

Despite its success, Facebook has faced significant controversies. Privacy concerns surfaced early, including criticism of its data collection practices. The Facebook–Cambridge Analytica data scandal in 2018 revealed misuse of user data to influence elections, sparking global outcry and leading to regulatory fines and hearings. Facebook has been accused of enabling the spread of misinformation and hate speech and influencing political outcomes, prompting debates about content moderation and social media's role in society. The platform has frequently updated its algorithms to balance user experience with engagement-driven revenue, but these changes have sometimes drawn criticism for amplifying divisive content. Facebook's role in global events, including its use in organizing movements like the Arab Spring and, controversially, its impact on events like the Rohingya genocide in Myanmar, highlights its dual nature as a tool for empowerment and harm.

In 2021, Facebook rebranded as Meta, reflecting its shift toward building the "metaverse" and focusing on virtual reality and augmented reality technologies. Facebook continues to shape digital communication, commerce, and culture worldwide, with billions of users making it a key organisation in the 21st century.

== Facemash ==
"Facemash" was a website designed to evaluate the attractiveness of Harvard students. It contained photographs of both female and male students. The students were unaware their images were being used for this rating, judging by the complaint from Fuerza Latina and the Harvard Association of Black Women. The site used ID photos of female undergraduates taken without permission from the university's online directories. Users were presented with pairs of photos and asked to rank who was "hotter." The homepage stated, "Were we admitted for our looks? No. Will we be judged by them? Yes."

By the end of Facemash's launch day, at least 22,000 votes from a total of approx. 400 to 450 users were cast on the site. According to a 2003 article from The Harvard Crimson, Zuckerberg created the site in less than a week and documented the process in a blog. He hacked into the online intranets of Harvard Houses to obtain photos, developing algorithms and codes along the way. He referred to his hacking as "child's play." In a blog entry, Zuckerberg noted, "The Kirkland Facebook (referring to the Kirkland House intranet) is open on my computer desktop, and some of these people have pretty horrendous Facebook pictures. I almost want to put some of these faces next to pictures of farm animals and have people vote on which is more attractive."

Zuckerberg faced scrutiny from the university's Administrative Board in November 2003 after Facemash caused an uproar in Harvard. Groups such as Fuerza Latina and the Harvard Association of Black Women protested, and the computer services department filed a complaint with the Administrative Board. Zuckerberg was accused of breaching security, violating copyrights, and infringing on individual privacy.

As a consequence, the Harvard Administrative Board removed the site on 2 November. The actions taken against Zuckerberg, if any, are unknown. He was not made to withdraw or leave school. He did not elaborate on whether the board took any other lesser actions.

Zuckerberg expanded on the Facemash project the same semester by creating a social study tool. He uploaded art images, each accompanied by a comments section, to a website he shared with his classmates.

== TheFacebook ==
Original layout and name of Thefacebook in 2004, showing Peter Wolf's face superimposed with binary numbers as Facebook's original logo, designed by co-founder Andrew McCollum

A "facebook" is a student directory featuring photos and basic information. In 2004, there were no universal online facebooks at Harvard, with only paper sheets distributed and private online directories. Zuckerberg told the Crimson that "Everyone's been talking a lot about a universal face book within Harvard. ... I think it's kind of silly that it would take the University a couple of years to get around to it. I can do it better than they can, and I can do it in a week." In January 2004, Zuckerberg began writing a code for a new website, known as "TheFacebook", with the inspiration coming from an editorial in the Crimson about Facemash, stating that "It is clear that the technology needed to create a centralized Website is readily available ... the benefits are many." Zuckerberg met with Harvard student Eduardo Saverin, and each of them agreed to invest $1,000 in the site. On February 4, 2004, Zuckerberg launched it under the name of "TheFacebook", originally located at thefacebook.com.

Zuckerberg intended to create a website that could connect people around the university. Upon finishing the site, Zuckerberg told a couple of friends, one of whom suggested sharing it on the Kirkland House online mailing list, which included several hundred people. According to his roommate, Dustin Moskovitz, "By the end of the night, we were ... actively watching the registration process. Within twenty-four hours, we had somewhere between twelve hundred and fifteen hundred registrants."

Just six days after the launch of the site, three Harvard University seniors, Cameron Winklevoss, Tyler Winklevoss, and Divya Narendra, accused Zuckerberg of intentionally misleading them into believing that he would help them build a social network called HarvardConnection.com, but instead using their idea to build a competing product. The three complained to the Crimson, and the newspaper began an investigation. Zuckerberg knew about the investigation so he used TheFacebook.com to find members in the site who identified themselves as members of the Crimson. He examined a history of failed logins to see if any of the Crimson members had ever entered an incorrect password into TheFacebook.com. In the cases in which they had failed to log in, Zuckerberg tried to use them to access the Crimson members' Harvard email accounts, and he was successful in accessing two of them. In the end, three Crimson members filed a lawsuit against Zuckerberg which was later settled.

Membership was initially restricted to students of Harvard University. Within the first month, more than half the undergraduate population at Harvard was registered on the service. Zuckerberg was joined in the promotion of the site by Saverin (business aspects), Dustin Moskovitz (programmer), Andrew McCollum (graphic artist), and Chris Hughes. In March 2004, Facebook expanded to Stanford, Columbia, and Yale. This expansion continued when it opened to all Ivy League and Boston-area schools. It gradually reached most universities in the United States and Canada. Facebook was incorporated in the summer of 2004, and the entrepreneur Sean Parker, who had been informally advising Zuckerberg, became the company's president. In June 2004, Facebook moved its base of operations to Palo Alto, California.

== Facebook ==
Total active users (Note: An "active user" is defined by Facebook as a user who has visited the website in the last 30 days.)
Date	Users (in millions)	±% p.m.
2004-02-04	0	—
2004-04-04	0.07	—
2004-07-04	0.1	—
2004-10-04	1.5	—
2008-08-26	100	—
2009-04-08	200	+9.83%
2009-09-15	300	+8.02%
2010-01-05	400	+8.13%
2010-07-21	500	+3.51%
2011-01-05	600 (Note: This value is from an investment document. The date is from when the document was revealed to the public, not the actual date that the website reached this many users.)	+3.36%
2011-05-30	700	+3.29%
2011-09-22	800	+3.60%
2012-04-24	900	+1.68%
2012-09-14	1,000	+2.27%
2013-03-31	1,110	+1.62%
2013-12-31	1,230	+1.14%
2014-12-31	1,390	+1.02%
2015-12-31	1,590	+1.13%
2016-12-31	1,860	+1.31%

The company dropped 'The' from its name after purchasing the domain name facebook.com in 2005 for $200,000 ($329,698 in 2025 dollars). The domain had belonged to AboutFace Corporation.

In May 2005, Accel Partners invested $13 million ($20.9 million in 2025 dollars) in Facebook, and Jim Breyer added $1 million ($1.65 million in 2025 dollars) of his own money. A high-school version of the site launched in September 2005. Eligibility expanded to include employees of several companies, including Apple Inc. and Microsoft.

=== 2006–2012: Public access, Microsoft alliance, and rapid growth ===
In May 2006, Facebook hired its first intern, Julie Zhuo. After a month, Zhuo was hired as a full-time engineer. On September 26, 2006, Facebook opened to everyone at least 13 years old with a valid email address. By late 2007, Facebook had 100,000 pages on which companies promoted themselves. Organization pages began rolling out in May 2009. On October 24, 2007, Microsoft announced that it had purchased a 1.6% share of Facebook for $240 million ($373 million in 2025 dollars), giving Facebook a total implied value of around $15 billion ($23.3 billion in 2025 dollars). Microsoft's purchase included rights to place international advertisements.

In May 2007, at the first f8 developers conference, Facebook announced the launch of the Facebook Developer Platform, providing a framework for software developers to create applications that interact with core Facebook features. By the second annual f8 developers conference on July 23, 2008, the number of applications on the platform had grown to 33,000, and the number of registered developers had exceeded 400,000.

The website won awards such as placement into the "Top 100 Classic Websites" by PC Magazine in 2007, and winning the "People's Voice Award" from the Webby Awards in 2008. In early 2008, Facebook became EBITDA profitable, but was not cash flow positive yet.

On July 20, 2008, Facebook introduced "Facebook Beta", a significant redesign of its user interface on selected networks. The Mini-Feed and Wall were consolidated, profiles were separated into tabbed sections, and an effort was made to create a cleaner look. Facebook began migrating users to the new version in September 2008. In July 2008, Facebook sued StudiVZ, a German social network that was alleged to be visually and functionally similar to Facebook.

In October 2008, Facebook announced that its international headquarters would locate in Dublin, Ireland. A January 2009 Compete.com study ranked Facebook the most used social networking service by worldwide monthly active users. China blocked Facebook in 2009 following the Ürümqi riots.

In 2009, Yuri Milner's DST (which later split into DST Global and Mail.ru Group), alongside Uzbek Russian metals magnate Alisher Usmanov, invested $200 million in Facebook when it was valued at $10 billion. A separate stake was also acquired by Usmanov's USM Holdings on another occasion. According to The New York Times in 2013, "Mr. Usmanov and other Russian investors at one point owned nearly 10 percent of Facebook, though precise details of their ownership stakes are difficult to assess." It was later revealed in 2017 by the Paradise Papers that lending by Russian state-backed VTB Bank and Gazprom's investment vehicle partially financed these 2009 investments, although Milner was reportedly unaware at the time.

In May 2009, Zuckerberg said of the $200 million Russian investment, "This investment is purely buffer for us. It is not something we needed to get to cash flow positive." In September 2009, Facebook became cash flow positive ahead of schedule after closing a roughly $200 million gap in operating profitability.

In 2010, Facebook won the Crunchie "Best Overall Startup Or Product" award for the third year in a row.

The company announced 500 million users in July 2010. Half of the site's membership used Facebook daily, for an average of 34 minutes, while 150 million users accessed the site from mobile devices. A company representative called the milestone a "quiet revolution". In October 2010 groups were introduced. In November 2010, based on SecondMarket Inc. (an exchange for privately held companies' shares), Facebook's value was $41 billion ($60.5 billion in 2025 dollars). The company had slightly surpassed eBay to become the third largest American web company after Google and Amazon.com.

On November 15, 2010, Facebook announced it had acquired the domain name fb.com from the American Farm Bureau Federation for an undisclosed amount. On January 11, 2011, the Farm Bureau disclosed $8.5 million ($12.2 million in 2025 dollars) in "domain sales income", making the acquisition of FB.com one of the ten highest domain sales in history.

In February 2011, Facebook announced plans to move its headquarters to the former Sun Microsystems campus in Menlo Park, California. In March 2011, it was reported that Facebook was removing about 20,000 profiles daily for violations such as spam, graphic content and underage use, as part of its efforts to boost cyber security. Statistics showed that Facebook reached one trillion page views in the month of June 2011, making it the most visited website tracked by DoubleClick. According to a Nielsen study, Facebook had in 2011 become the second-most accessed website in the U.S. behind Google.

=== 2012–2013: IPO, lawsuits, and one billion active users ===
In March 2012, Facebook announced App Center, a store selling applications that operate via the website. The store was to be available on iPhones, Android devices, and for mobile web users.

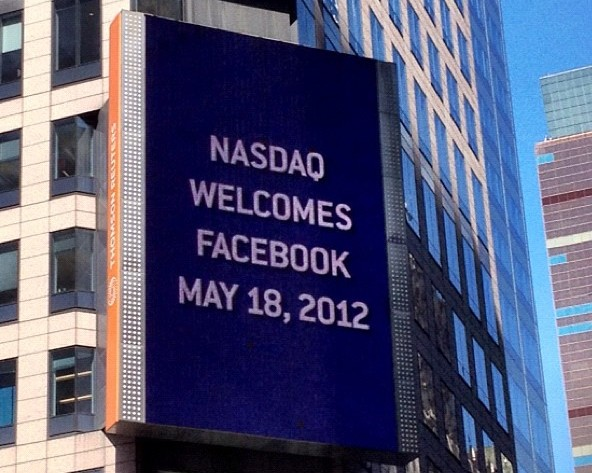
Billboard on the Thomson Reuters building welcomes Facebook to NASDAQ, May 2012.

Facebook's initial public offering came on May 17, 2012, at a share price of US$38 ($53.00 in 2025 dollars). The company was valued at $104 billion ($146 billion in 2025 dollars), the largest valuation to that date. The IPO raised $16 billion ($22.4 billion in 2025 dollars), the third-largest in U.S. history, after Visa Inc. in 2008 and AT&T Wireless in 2000. Based on its 2012 income of $5 billion ($7.01 billion in 2025 dollars), Facebook joined the Fortune 500 list for the first time in May 2013, ranked 462. The shares set a first-day record for trading volume of an IPO (460 million shares). The IPO was controversial given the immediate price declines that followed, and was the subject of lawsuits, while SEC and FINRA both launched investigations.

Zuckerberg announced at the start of October 2012 that Facebook had one billion monthly active users, including 600 million mobile users, 219 billion photo uploads and 140 billion friend connections.

On October 1, 2012, Zuckerberg visited Russian Prime Minister Dmitry Medvedev in Moscow to stimulate social media innovation in Russia and to boost Facebook's position in the Russian market.

=== 2013–2014: Site developments, A4AI, and 10th anniversary ===
On January 15, 2013, Facebook announced Facebook Graph Search, which provides users with a "precise answer", rather than a link to an answer by leveraging data present on its site. Facebook emphasized that the feature would be "privacy-aware", returning results only from content already shared with the user. On April 3, 2013, Facebook unveiled Facebook Home, a user-interface layer for Android devices offering greater integration with the site. HTC announced HTC First, a phone with Home pre-loaded.

On April 15, 2013, Facebook announced an alliance across 19 states with the National Association of Attorneys General, to provide teenagers and parents with information on tools to manage social networking profiles. On April 19 Facebook modified its logo to remove the faint blue line at the bottom of the "F" icon. The letter F moved closer to the edge of the box.

Following a campaign by 100 advocacy groups, Facebook agreed to update its policy on hate speech. The campaign highlighted content promoting domestic violence and sexual violence against women and led 15 advertisers to withdraw, including Nissan UK, House of Burlesque, and Nationwide UK. The company initially stated, "while it may be vulgar and offensive, distasteful content on its own does not violate our policies". It took action on May 29.

On June 12, Facebook announced that it was introducing clickable hashtags to help users follow trending discussions, or search what others are talking about on a topic. San Mateo County, California, became the top wage-earning county in the country after the fourth quarter of 2012 because of Facebook. The Bureau of Labor Statistics reported that the average salary was 107% higher than the previous year, at $168,000 a year ($235,599 in 2025 dollars), more than 50% higher than the next-highest county, New York County (better known as Manhattan), at roughly $110,000 a year ($154,261 in 2025 dollars).

Facebook joined Alliance for Affordable Internet (A4AI) in October, as it launched. The A4AI is a coalition of public and private organizations that includes Google, Intel and Microsoft. Led by Sir Tim Berners-Lee, the A4AI seeks to make Internet access more affordable to ease access in the developing world.

The company celebrated its 10th anniversary during the week of February 3, 2014. In January 2014, over one billion users connected via a mobile device. As of June, mobile accounted for 62% of advertising revenue, an increase of 21% from the previous year. By September Facebook's market capitalization had exceeded $200 billion ($272 billion in 2025 dollars).

Zuckerberg participated in a Q&A session at Tsinghua University in Beijing, China, on October 23, where he attempted to converse in Mandarin. Zuckerberg hosted visiting Chinese politician Lu Wei, known as the "Internet czar" for his influence in China's online policy, on December 8.

=== 2015–2020: Algorithm revision; fake news ===
As of 2015, Facebook's algorithm was revised in an attempt to filter out false or misleading content, such as fake news stories and hoaxes. It relied on users who flag a story accordingly. Facebook maintained that satirical content should not be intercepted. The algorithm was accused of maintaining a "filter bubble", where material the user disagrees with and posts with few likes would be deprioritized. In November, Facebook extended paternity leave from 4 weeks to 4 months.

On April 12, 2016, Zuckerberg outlined his 10-year vision, which rested on three main pillars: artificial intelligence, increased global connectivity, and virtual and augmented reality. In July, a US$1 billion suit was filed against the company alleging that it permitted Hamas to use it to perform assaults that cost the lives of four people. Facebook released its blueprints of Surround 360 camera on GitHub under an open-source license. In September, it won an Emmy for its animated short "Henry". In October, Facebook announced a fee-based communications tool called Workplace that aims to "connect everyone" at work. Users can create profiles, see updates from co-workers on their news feed, stream live videos and participate in secure group chats.

Following the 2016 U.S. presidential election, Facebook announced that it would combat fake news by using fact checkers from sites like FactCheck.org and Associated Press (AP), making reporting hoaxes easier through crowdsourcing, and disrupting financial incentives for abusers.

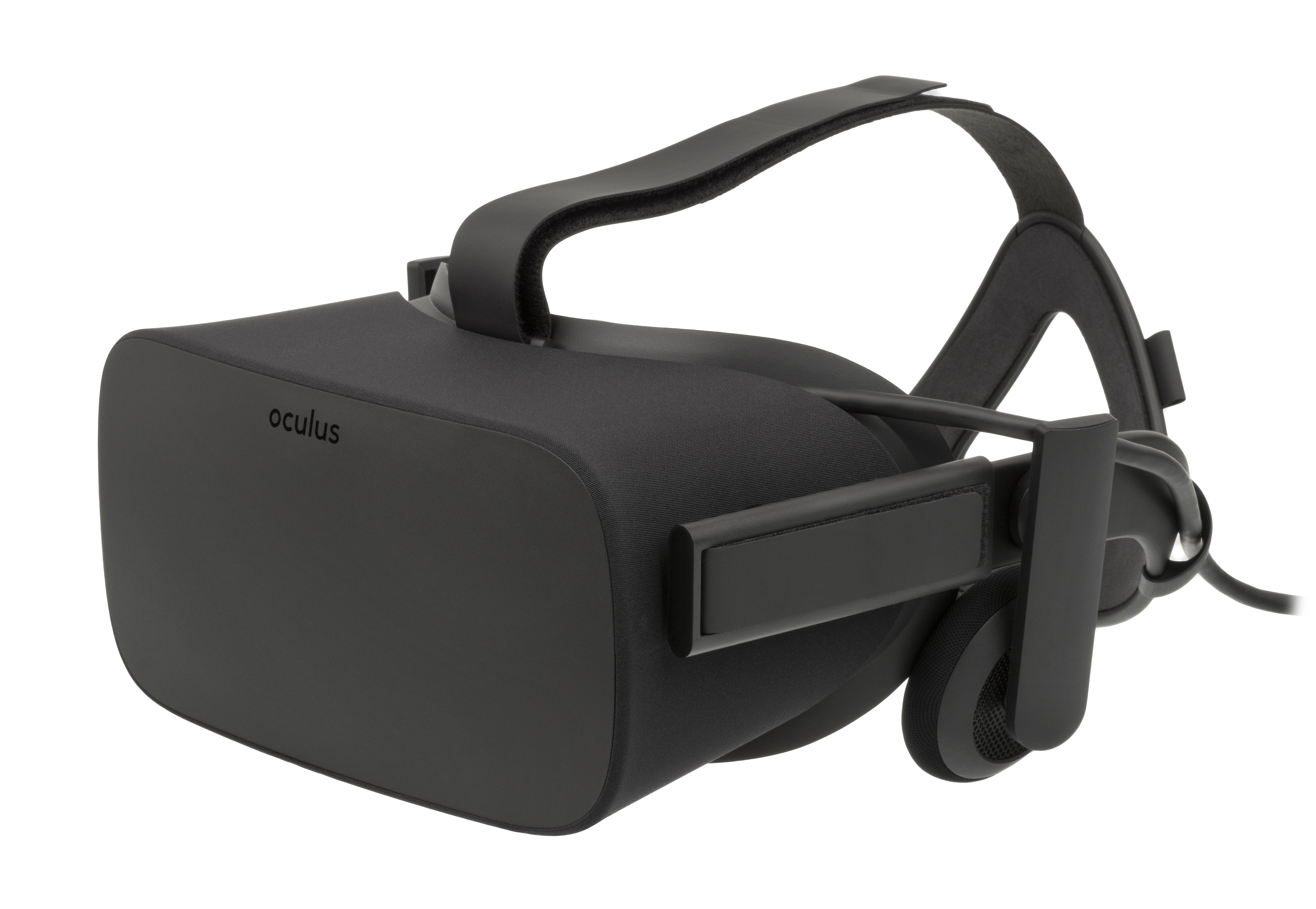
Oculus VR headset

On January 17, 2017, Facebook COO Sheryl Sandberg planned to open Station F, a startup incubator campus in Paris, France. On a six-month cycle, Facebook committed to work with ten to 15 data-driven startups there. On April 18, Facebook announced the beta launch of Facebook Spaces at its annual F8 developer conference. Facebook Spaces is a virtual reality version of Facebook for Oculus VR goggles. In a virtual and shared space, users can access a curated selection of 360-degree photos and videos using their avatar, with the support of the controller. Users can access their own photos and videos, along with media shared on their newsfeed. In September, Facebook announced it would spend up to US$1 billion on original shows for its Facebook Watch platform. On October 16, it acquired the anonymous compliment app tbh, announcing its intention to leave the app independent.

In October 2017, Facebook expanded its work with Definers Public Affairs, a PR firm that had originally been hired to monitor press coverage of the company to address concerns primarily regarding Russian meddling, then mishandling of user data by Cambridge Analytica, hate speech on Facebook, and calls for regulation. Company spokesman Tim Miller stated that a goal for tech firms should be to "have positive content pushed out about your company and negative content that's being pushed out about your competitor". Definers claimed that George Soros was the force behind what appeared to be a broad anti-Facebook movement, and created other negative media, along with America Rising, that was picked up by larger media organisations like Breitbart News. Facebook cut ties with the agency in late 2018, following public outcry over their association. Posts originating from the Facebook page of Breitbart News, a media organization previously affiliated with Cambridge Analytica, were among the most widely shared political content on Facebook.

In May 2018 at F8, the company announced it would offer its own dating service. Shares in competitor Match Group fell by 22%. Facebook Dating includes privacy features and friends are unable to view their friends' dating profile. In July, Facebook was charged £500,000 by UK watchdogs for failing to respond to data erasure requests. On July 18, Facebook established a subsidiary named Lianshu Science & Technology in Hangzhou City, China, with $30 million ($38.5 million in 2025 dollars) of capital. All its shares are held by Facebook Hong. Approval of the registration of the subsidiary was then withdrawn, due to a disagreement between officials in Zhejiang province and the Cyberspace Administration of China. On July 26, Facebook became the first company to lose over $100 billion ($128 billion in 2025 dollars) worth of market capitalization in one day, dropping from nearly $630 billion to $510 billion after disappointing sales reports. On July 31, Facebook said that the company had deleted 17 accounts related to the 2018 U.S. midterm elections. On September 19, Facebook announced that, for news distribution outside the United States, it would work with U.S. funded democracy promotion organizations, International Republican Institute and the National Democratic Institute, which are loosely affiliated with the Republican and Democratic parties. Through the Digital Forensic Research Lab Facebook partners with the Atlantic Council, a NATO-affiliated think tank. In November, Facebook launched smart displays branded Portal and Portal Plus (Portal+). They support Amazon's Alexa (intelligent personal assistant service). The devices include video chat function with Facebook Messenger.

In August 2018, a lawsuit was filed in Oakland, California claiming that Facebook created fake accounts to inflate its user data and appeal to advertisers in the process.

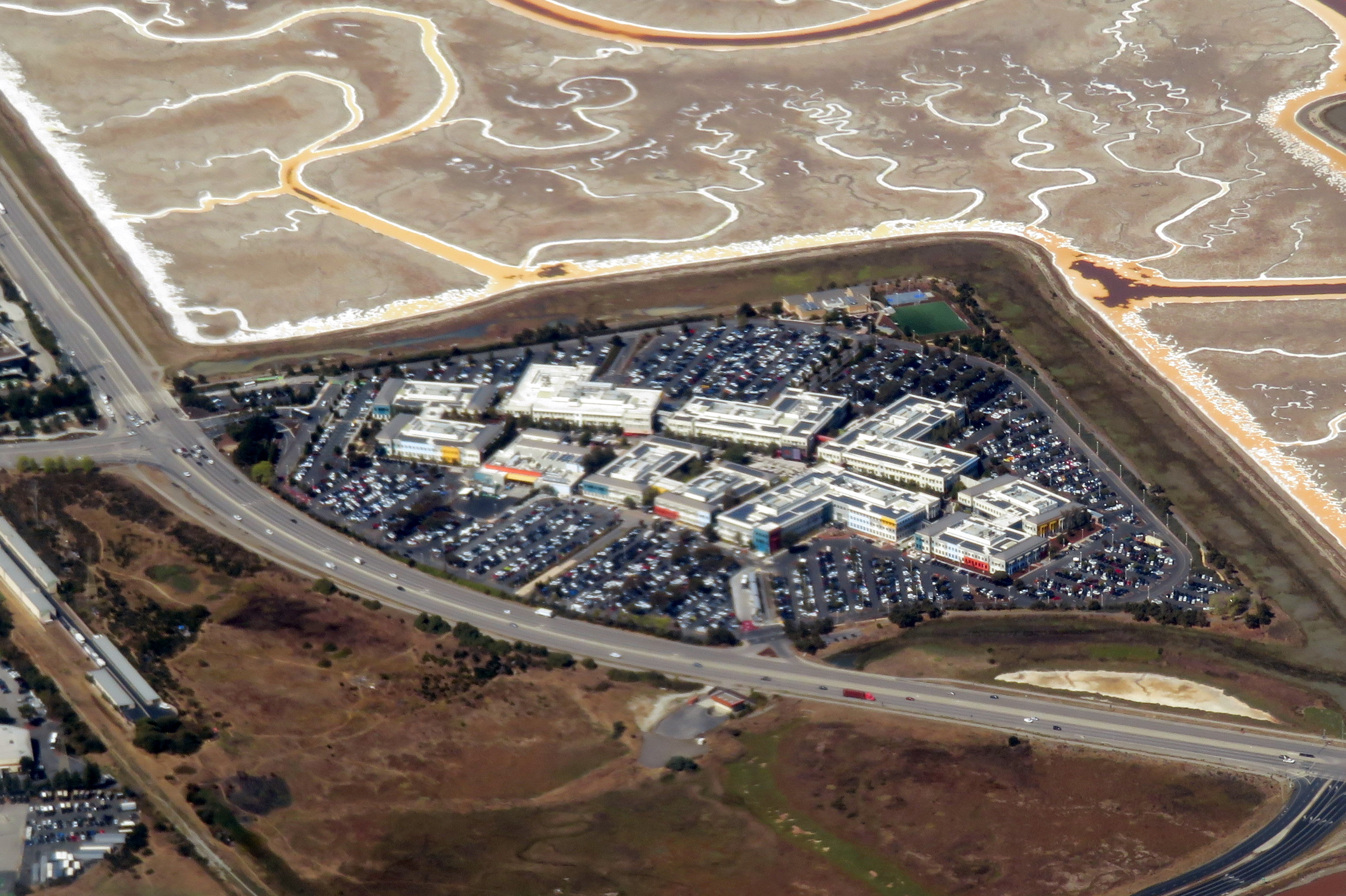
Aerial view of Meta HQ in Menlo Park, California

In January 2019, the 10-year challenge was started asking users to post a photograph of themselves from 10 years ago (2009) and a more recent photo.

Criticized for its role in vaccine hesitancy, Facebook announced in March 2019 that it would provide users with "authoritative information" on the topic of vaccines. A study published in the journal Vaccine of advertisements posted in the three months prior to that found that 54% of the anti-vaccine advertisements on Facebook were placed by just two organisations funded by well-known anti-vaccination activists. The Children's Health Defense / World Mercury Project chaired by Robert F. Kennedy Jr. and Stop Mandatory Vaccination, run by campaigner Larry Cook, posted 54% of the advertisements. The ads often linked to commercial products, such as natural remedies and books.

On March 14, the Huffington Post reported that Facebook's PR agency had paid someone to tweak Facebook COO Sheryl Sandberg's Wikipedia page, as well as adding a page for the global head of PR, Caryn Marooney.

In March 2019, the perpetrator of the Christchurch mosque shootings in New Zealand used Facebook to stream live footage of the attack as it unfolded. Facebook took 29 minutes to detect the livestreamed video, which was eight minutes longer than it took police to arrest the gunman. About 1.3m copies of the video were blocked from Facebook but 300,000 copies were published and shared. Facebook has promised changes to its platform; spokesman Simon Dilner told Radio New Zealand that it could have done a better job. Several companies, including the ANZ and ASB banks, have stopped advertising on Facebook after the company was widely condemned by the public. Following the attack, Facebook began blocking white nationalist, white supremacist, and white separatist content, saying that they could not be meaningfully separated. Previously, Facebook had only blocked overtly supremacist content. The older policy had been condemned by civil rights groups, who described these movements as functionally indistinct. Further bans were made in mid-April 2019, banning several British far-right organizations and associated individuals from Facebook, and also banning praise or support for them.

NTJ's member Moulavi Zahran Hashim, a radical Islamist imam believed to be the mastermind behind the 2019 Sri Lanka Easter bombings, preached on a pro-ISIL Facebook account, known as "Al-Ghuraba" media.

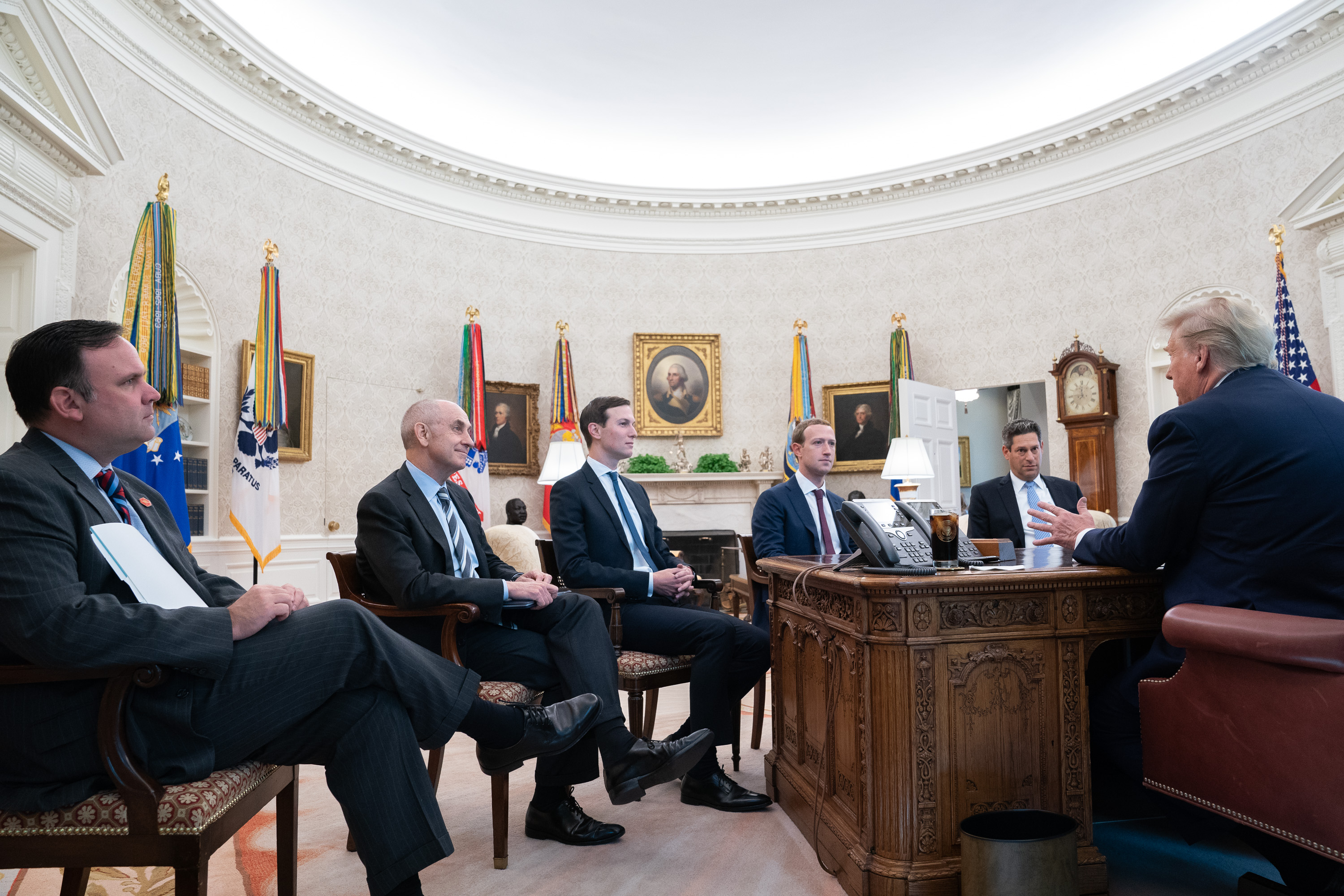
Facebook CEO Mark Zuckerberg and Facebook executives with President Donald Trump in September 2019

On May 2, 2019, at F8, the company announced its new vision with the tagline "the future is private". A redesign of the website and mobile app was introduced, dubbed as "FB5". The event also featured plans for improving groups, a dating platform, end-to-end encryption on its platforms, and allowing users on Messenger to communicate directly with WhatsApp and Instagram users.

On July 31, 2019, Facebook announced a partnership with University of California, San Francisco to build a non-invasive, wearable device that lets people type by simply imagining themselves talking.

On August 13, 2019, it was revealed that Facebook had enlisted hundreds of contractors to create and obtain transcripts of the audio messages of users. This was especially common of Facebook Messenger, where the contractors frequently listened to and transcribed voice messages of users. After this was first reported on by Bloomberg News, Facebook released a statement confirming the report to be true, but also stated that the monitoring program was now suspended.

On September 5, 2019, Facebook launched Facebook Dating in the United States. This new application allows users to integrate their Instagram posts in their dating profile.

Facebook News, which features selected stories from news organizations, was launched on October 25. Facebook's decision to include far-right website Breitbart News as a "trusted source" was negatively received.

On November 17, 2019, the banking data for 29,000 Facebook employees was stolen from a payroll worker's car. The data was stored on unencrypted hard drives and included bank account numbers, employee names, the last four digits of their social security numbers, salaries, bonuses, and equity details. The company did not realize the hard drives were missing until November 20. Facebook confirmed that the drives contained employee information on November 29. Employees were not notified of the break-in until December 13, 2019.

On March 10, 2020, Facebook appointed two new directors Tracey Travis and Nancy Killefer to their board of members.

In June 2020, several major companies including Adidas, Aviva, Coca-Cola, Ford, HP, InterContinental Hotels Group, Mars, Starbucks, Target, and Unilever, announced they would pause adverts on Facebook for July in support of the Stop Hate For Profit campaign which claimed the company was not doing enough to remove hateful content. The BBC noted that this was unlikely to affect the company as most of Facebook's advertising revenue comes from small- to medium-sized businesses.

On August 14, 2020, Facebook started integrating the direct messaging service of Instagram with its own Messenger for both iOS and Android devices. After the update, an update screen is said to pop up on Instagram's mobile app with the following message, "There's a New Way to Message on Instagram" with a list of additional features. As part of the update, the regular DM icon on the top right corner of Instagram will be replaced by the Facebook Messenger logo.

On September 15, 2020, Facebook launched a climate science information centre to promote authoritative voices on climate change and provide access of "factual and up-to-date" information on climate science. It featured facts, figures and data from organizations, including the Intergovernmental Panel on Climate Change (IPCC), Met Office, UN Environment Programme (UNEP), National Oceanic and Atmospheric Administration (NOAA) and World Meteorological Organization (WMO), with relevant news posts.

After the 2020 U.S. presidential election, Facebook temporarily increased the weight of ecosystem quality in its news feed algorithm.

=== 2020–present: FTC lawsuit, corporate re-branding, shut down of facial recognition technology, ease of policy ===
In January 2021, as part of a redesign, Facebook removed likes from its public pages used by famous people and brands.

Facebook was sued by the Federal Trade Commission as well as a coalition of several states for illegal monopolization and antitrust. The FTC and states sought the courts to force Facebook to sell its subsidiaries WhatsApp and Instagram. The suits were dismissed by a federal judge on June 28, 2021, who stated that there was not enough evidence brought in the suit to determine Facebook to be a monopoly at this point, though allowed the FTC to amend its case to include additional evidence. In its amended filings in August 2021, the FTC asserted that Facebook had been a monopoly in the area of personal social networks since 2011, distinguishing Facebook's activities from social media services like TikTok that broadcast content without necessarily limiting that message to intended recipients.

In response to the proposed bill in the Australian Parliament for a News Media Bargaining Code, on February 17, 2021, Facebook blocked Australian users from sharing or viewing news content on its platform, as well as pages of some government, community, union, charity, political, and emergency services. The Australian government strongly criticised the move, saying it demonstrated the "immense market power of these digital social giants". On February 22, Facebook said it reached an agreement with the Australian government that would see news returning to Australian users in the coming days. As part of this agreement, Facebook and Google can avoid the News Media Bargaining Code adopted on February 25 if they "reach a commercial bargain with a news business outside the Code". Facebook has been accused of removing and shadow banning content that spoke either in favor of protesting Indian farmers or against Narendra Modi's government. India-based employees of Facebook are at risk of arrest. On February 27, 2021, Facebook announced Facebook BARS app for rappers. On June 29, 2021, Facebook announced Bulletin, a platform for independent writers. Unlike competitors such as Substack, Facebook would not take a cut of subscription fees of writers using that platform upon its launch, like Malcolm Gladwell and Mitch Albom. According to The Washington Post technology writer Will Oremus, the move was criticized by those who viewed it as a tactic intended by Facebook to force those competitors out of business.

In October 2021, owner Facebook, Inc. changed its company name to Meta Platforms, Inc., or simply "Meta", as it shifts its focus to building the "metaverse". This change does not affect the name of the Facebook social networking service itself, instead being similar to the creation of Alphabet as Google's parent company in 2015.

In November 2021, Facebook stated it would stop targeting ads based on data related to health, race, ethnicity, political beliefs, religion and sexual orientation. The change will occur in January and will affect all apps owned by Meta Platforms.

In February 2022, Facebook's daily active users dropped for the first time in its 18-year history. According to Facebook's parent Meta, DAUs dropped to 1.929 billion in the three months ending in December, down from 1.930 billion the previous quarter. Furthermore, the company warned that revenue growth would slow due to competition from TikTok and YouTube, as well as advertisers cutting back on spending.

On March 10, 2022, following Russia's invasion of Ukraine, Facebook announced that it would temporarily ease rules against violent speech in some cases when targeted at "Russian invaders", though it would still not tolerate credible threats against Russian civilians. Russia then banned all Meta services, including Instagram.

In September 2022, Jonathan Vanian, a Technology Reporter for CNBC, wrote a piece on CNBC.com about the recent struggles Facebook was experiencing, writing, "Users are jumping ship and advertisers are reducing their spending, leaving Meta poised to report its second straight drop in quarterly revenue." He also cited poor leadership decisions devoting resources to the metaverse, writing, "CEO Mark Zuckerberg spends much of his time proselytizing the metaverse, which may be the company's future but accounts for virtually none of its near-term revenue and is costing billions of dollars a year to build." He also detailed accounts from analysts predicting a "death spiral" for Facebook stock as users leave, ad impressions increase, and the company chases revenue.

==== October 4, 2021, global service outage ====
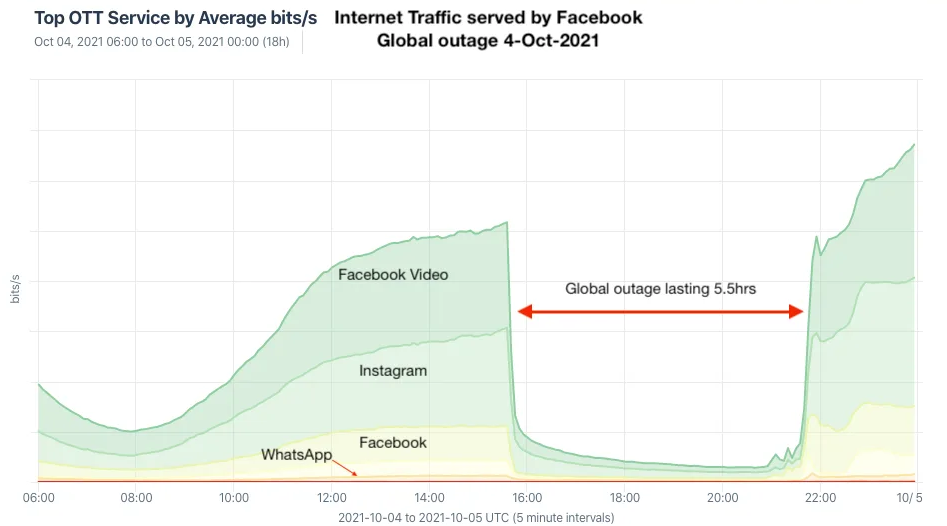
Traffic volume for Facebook services on October 4, 2021, with a drop during the global outage

On October 4, 2021, Facebook had its worst outage since 2008. The outage was global in scope, and took down all Facebook properties, including Instagram and WhatsApp, from approximately 15:39 UTC to 22:05 UTC, and affected roughly three billion users. Security experts identified the problem as a BGP withdrawal of all of the IP routes to their Domain Name (DNS) servers which were all self-hosted at the time. The outage also affected all internal communications systems used by Facebook employees, which disrupted restoration efforts.

The outage cut off Facebook's internal communications, preventing employees from sending or receiving external emails, accessing the corporate directory, and authenticating to some Google Docs and Zoom services. The outage had a major impact on people in the developing world, who depend on Facebook's "Free Basics" program, affecting communication, business and humanitarian work.

Facebook's chief technology officer, Mike Schroepfer, wrote an apology after the downtime had extended to several hours, saying, "Teams are working as fast as possible to debug and restore as fast as possible."

==== Shutdown of facial recognition ====
On November 2, 2021, Facebook announced it would shut down its facial recognition technology and delete the data on over a billion users. Meta later announced plans to implement the technology as well as other biometric systems in its future products, such as the metaverse.

The shutdown of the technology will reportedly also stop Facebook's automated alt text system, used to transcribe media on the platform for visually impaired users.

In February 2023, Meta CEO Mark Zuckerberg announced that Meta would start selling blue "verified" badges on Instagram and Facebook.

== Financials ==
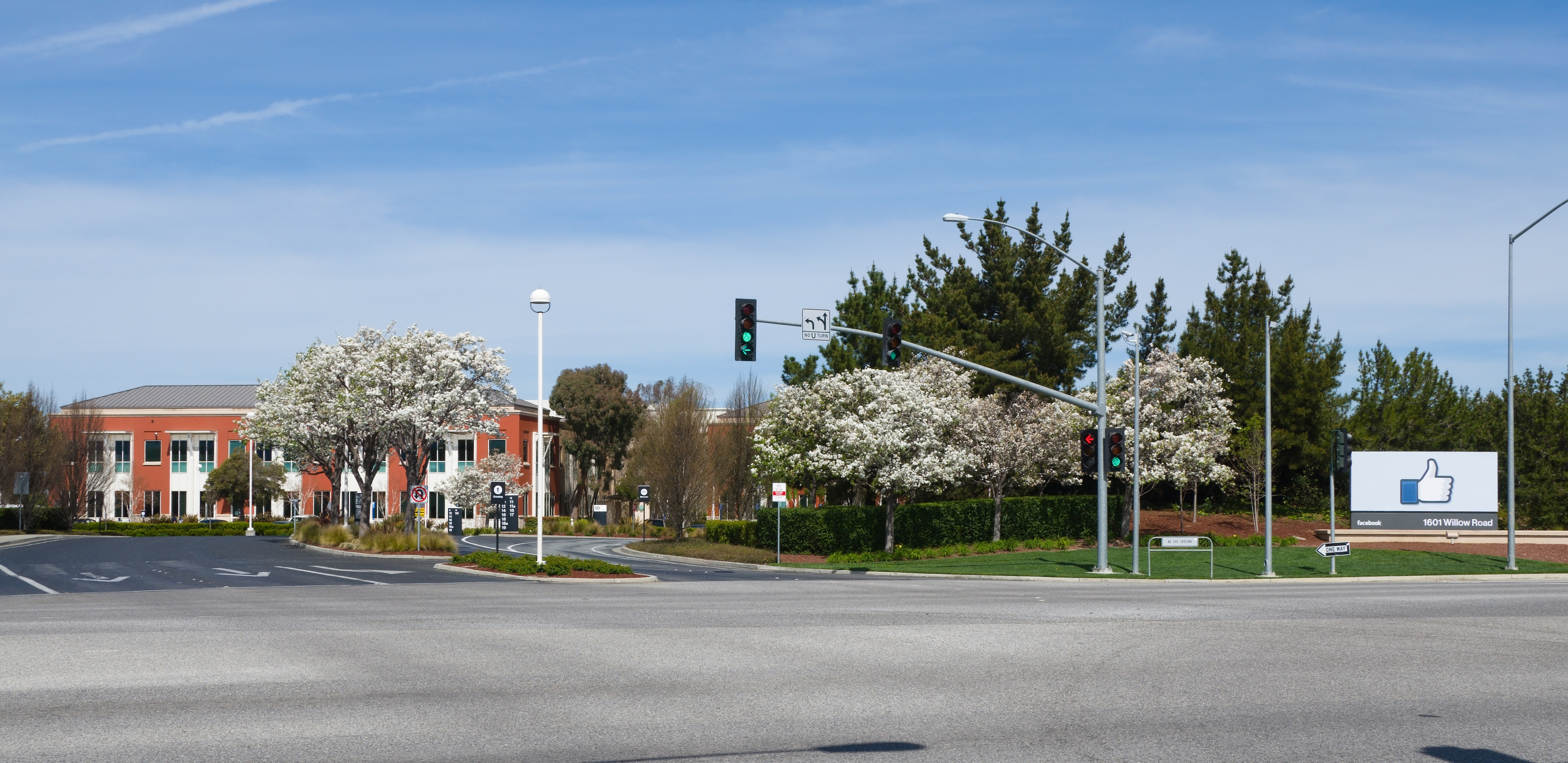
Entrance to Facebook headquarters complex in Menlo Park, California

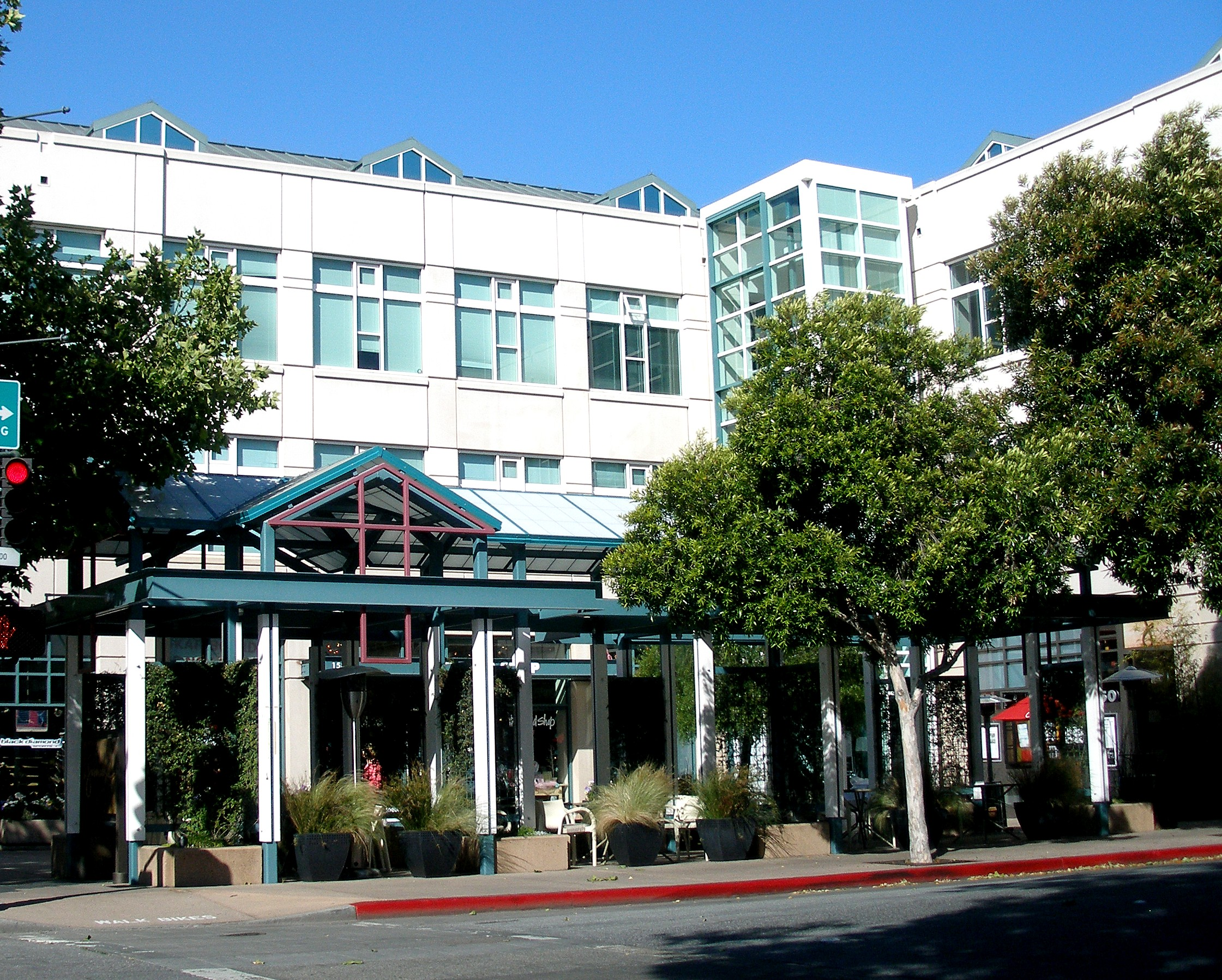
Facebook's former headquarters in downtown Palo Alto, California

=== Initial funding ===
Facebook was initially incorporated as a Florida LLC. For the first few months after its launch in February 2004, the costs for the website operations for thefacebook.com were paid for by Mark Zuckerberg and Eduardo Saverin, who had taken equity stakes in the company. The website also ran a few advertisements to meet its operating costs.

=== First angel investment ===
In the summer of 2004, venture capitalist Peter Thiel made a $500,001 angel investment in the social network Facebook for 10.2% of the company and joined Facebook's board. This was the first outside investment in Facebook.

In his book The Facebook Effect, David Kirkpatrick outlines the story of how Thiel came to make his investment: former Napster and Plaxo employee Sean Parker, who at the time had assumed the title of "President" of Facebook, was seeking investors for Facebook. Parker approached Reid Hoffman, the CEO of work-based social network LinkedIn. Hoffman liked Facebook but declined to be the lead investor because of the potential for conflict of interest with his duties as LinkedIn CEO. He redirected Parker to Peter Thiel, whom he knew from their PayPal days (both Hoffman and Thiel are considered members of the PayPal Mafia). Thiel met Parker and Mark Zuckerberg, the Harvard college student who had founded Facebook and controlled it. Thiel and Zuckerberg got along well and Thiel agreed to lead Facebook's seed round with $500,000 for 10.2% of the company. Hoffman and Mark Pincus also participated in the round, along with Maurice Werdegar who led the investment on behalf of Western Technology Investment. The investment was originally in the form of a convertible note, to be converted to equity if Facebook reached 1.5 million users by the end of 2004. Although Facebook narrowly missed the target, Thiel allowed the loan to be converted to equity anyway. Thiel said of his investment:

I was comfortable with them pursuing their original vision. And it was a very reasonable valuation. I thought it was going to be a pretty safe investment.

=== Accel investment (Series A) ===
In April 2005, Accel Partners agreed to make a $12.7 million venture capital investment in a deal that valued Facebook at $98 million. Accel joined Facebook's board, and the board was expanded to five seats, with Zuckerberg, Thiel, and Accel's Jim Breyer in three of the seats, and the other two seats currently being empty but with Zuckerberg free to nominate anybody to those seats.

=== Greylock investment (Series B) ===
In April 2006, Facebook closed its Series B funding round. This included $27.5 million from a number of venture capitalists, including Greylock Partners and Meritech Capital, plus additional investments from Peter Thiel and Accel Partners. The valuation for this round was about $500 million.

A leaked cash flow statement showed that during the 2005 fiscal year, Facebook had a net gain of $5.66 million.

=== Sales negotiations ===
With the sale of social networking website MySpace to News Corp on July 19, 2005, rumours surfaced about the possible sale of Facebook to a larger media company. Zuckerberg had already stated that he did not want to sell the company, and denied rumors to the contrary. On March 28, 2006, BusinessWeek reported that a potential acquisition of Facebook was under negotiation. Facebook reportedly declined an offer of $750 million from an unknown bidder, and it was rumored the asking price rose as high as $2 billion.

In September 2006, serious talks between Facebook and Yahoo! took place concerning acquisition of Facebook, with prices reaching as high as $1 billion. Thiel, by then a board member of Facebook, indicated that Facebook's internal valuation was around $8 billion based on their projected revenues of $1 billion by 2015, comparable to Viacom's MTV brand, a company with a shared target demographic audience.

On July 17, 2007, Zuckerberg said that selling Facebook was unlikely because he wanted to keep it independent, saying "We're not really looking to sell the company ... We're not looking to IPO anytime soon. It's just not the core focus of the company." In September 2007, Microsoft approached Facebook, proposing an investment in return for a 5% stake in the company, offering an estimated $300–500 million. That month, other companies, including Google, expressed interest in buying a portion of Facebook.

=== Microsoft investment (Series C) ===
On October 24, 2007, Microsoft announced that it had purchased a 1.6% share of Facebook for $240 million, giving Facebook a total implied value of around $15 billion. However, Microsoft bought preferred stock that carried special rights, such as "liquidation preferences" that meant Microsoft would get paid before common stockholders if the company were sold. Microsoft's purchase also included the right to place international ads on Facebook. In November 2007, Hong Kong billionaire Li Ka-shing invested $60 million in Facebook.

=== DST investment ===
In 2009, Yuri Milner's DST (which later split into DST Global and Mail.ru Group), alongside Uzbek Russian metals magnate Alisher Usmanov, invested $200 million in Facebook when it was valued at $10 billion. A separate stake was also acquired by Usmanov's USM Holdings on another occasion. According to The New York Times in 2013, "Mr. Usmanov and other Russian investors at one point owned nearly 10 percent of Facebook, though precise details of their ownership stakes are difficult to assess." It was later revealed in 2017 by the Paradise Papers that lending by Russian state-backed VTB Bank and Gazprom's investment vehicle partially financed these 2009 investments, although Milner was reportedly unaware at the time.

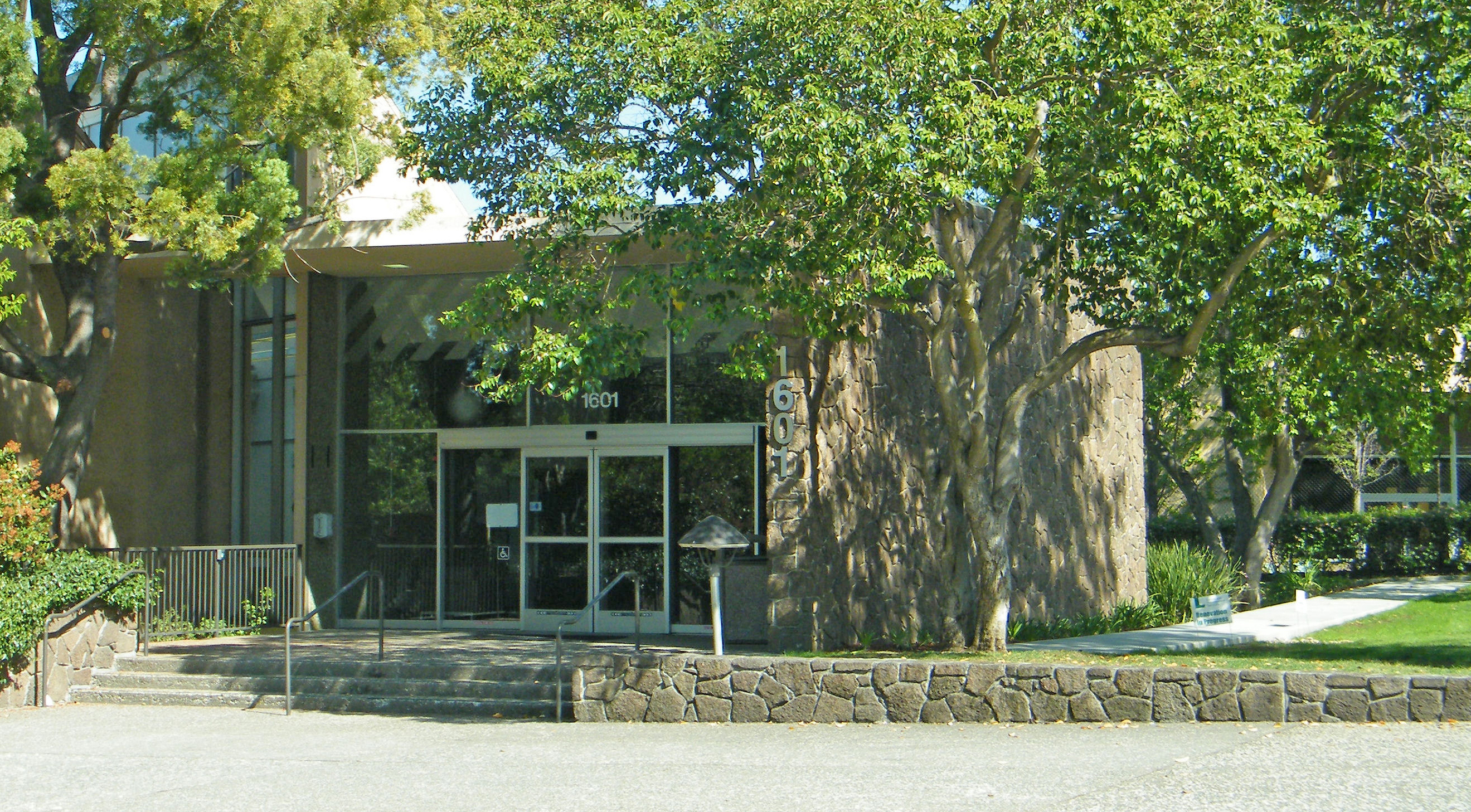
Entrance to Facebook's former headquarters in the Stanford Research Park, Palo Alto, California. In January 2012 the company moved to a new campus in Menlo Park, California.

=== Switch to profitability ===
In August 2008, BusinessWeek reported that private sales by employees, as well as purchases by venture capital firms, were being done at share prices that put the company's total valuation at between $3.75 billion and $5 billion. In October 2008, Zuckerberg said "I don't think social networks can be monetized in the same way that search did ... In three years from now we have to figure out what the optimum model is. But that is not our primary focus today."

Facebook hired Sheryl Sandberg as its chief operating officer in March 2008. Sandberg is reported to have held a number of brainstorming sessions with Facebook employees on their long-term monetization strategy, which led to the conclusion that advertising would be the main source of monetization. Under Sandberg's leadership, Facebook made a number of changes to its advertising model with the aim of achieving profitability. In September 2009, Facebook stated that it had turned cash flow positive for the first time.

In early 2012, Facebook disclosed that its profits had jumped 65% to $1 billion in the previous year when its revenue, which is mainly from advertising, had jumped almost 90% to $3.71 billion. Facebook also reported that 56% of its advertising revenue comes from the United States alone, and that 12% of its revenue comes from Zynga, the social network game development company. Payments and other fees were $557 million up from $106 million the previous year.

=== Acquisitions ===
In August 2009, Facebook acquired social media real-time news aggregator FriendFeed, a startup created by Gmail's first engineer Paul Buchheit.

In February 2010, Facebook acquired Malaysian contact-importing startup Octazen Solutions. On April 2, 2010, Facebook announced acquisition of a photo-sharing service called Divvyshot for an undisclosed amount. In June 2010, an online marketplace for trading private Facebook stock reflected a valuation of $11.5 billion.

On April 12, 2012, Facebook acquired photo sharing service Instagram for approximately $1 billion in cash and stock.

On March 8, 2013, Facebook announced that they acquired the team from Storylane, but not the product itself. On October 13, 2013, Facebook acquired Onavo, an Israeli analytics company, for approximately $120 million.

On February 19, 2014, Facebook announced its acquisition of WhatsApp, a smartphone instant messaging application for $19 billion in a mix of stock and cash. The acquisition is the most ever paid for a venture-capital backed startup.

On March 25, 2014, Facebook announced they had acquired virtual reality startup Oculus VR for $2 billion in cash and stock.

== Initial public offering ==
Facebook filed for an initial public offering (IPO) on February 1, 2012. The preliminary prospectus stated that the company was seeking to raise $5 billion. The document announced that the company had 845 million active monthly users and its website featured 2.7 billion daily likes and comments. After the IPO, Zuckerberg retains a 22% ownership share in Facebook and owns 57% of the voting shares.

Underwriters valued the shares at $38 each, pricing the company at $104 billion, the largest valuation to date for a newly public company. On May 16, one day before the IPO, Facebook announced that it would sell 25% more shares than originally planned due to high demand. The IPO raised $16 billion, making it the third largest in U.S. history (just ahead of AT&T Wireless and behind only General Motors and Visa Inc.). The stock price left the company with a higher market capitalization than all but a few U.S. corporations – surpassing heavyweights such as Amazon.com, McDonald's, Disney, and Kraft Foods – and made Zuckerberg's stock worth $19 billion. The New York Times stated that the offering overcame questions about Facebook's difficulties in attracting advertisers to transform the company into a "must-own stock". Jimmy Lee of JPMorgan Chase described it as "the next great blue-chip". Writers at TechCrunch, on the other hand, expressed skepticism, stating, "That's a big multiple to live up to, and [Facebook] will likely need to add bold new revenue streams to justify the mammoth valuation".

Trading in the stock, which began on May 18, was delayed that day due to technical problems with the NASDAQ exchange. The stock struggled to stay above the IPO price for most of the day, forcing underwriters to buy back shares to support the price. At closing bell, shares were valued at $38.23, only $0.23 above the IPO price and down $3.82 from the opening bell value. The opening was widely described by the financial press as a disappointment. The stock nonetheless set a new record for trading volume of an IPO. On May 25, 2012, the stock ended its first full week of trading at $31.91, a 16.5% decline.

On 22 May, regulators from Wall Street's Financial Industry Regulatory Authority announced that they had begun to investigate whether banks underwriting Facebook had improperly shared information only with select clients, rather than the general public. Massachusetts Secretary of State William Galvin subpoenaed Morgan Stanley over the same issue. The allegations sparked "fury" among some investors and led to the immediate filing of several lawsuits, one of them a class action suit claiming more than $2.5 billion in losses due to the IPO. Bloomberg estimated that retail investors may have lost approximately $630 million on Facebook stock since its debut.

== Timeline ==
Year	Month and date (if available)	Event type	Event
2004	January	Creation	Mark Zuckerberg begins with his fellow co-founders writing Facebook.
2004	February 4	Creation	Zuckerberg founded Facebook as a Harvard-only social network.
2004	April 13	Financial/legal	Zuckerberg, Dustin Moskovitz, and Eduardo Saverin form launched Thefacebook.com LLC, a partnership.
2004	June	Funding	Facebook receives its first investment from Peter Thiel for US$500,000.
2004	July 29	Financial/legal	Facebook incorporates into a new company, and Sean Parker (early employee of Napster) becomes its president.
2004	August	Product	To compete with growing campus-only service i2hub, Zuckerberg Launches Wirehog. It is a precursor to Facebook Platform applications.
2004	September	Financial/legal	ConnectU files a lawsuit against Zuckerberg and other Facebook founders.
2004	December 30	Userbase	Facebook achieves its one millionth registered user.
2005	March 10	Userbase	Facebook expands to UK universities. University of Surrey, Cambridge and Oxford are the first three UK universities on the platform.
2005	May 26	Funding	Accel Partners invests $13 million into Facebook.
2005	July 19	Acquisition talks	News Corp acquires MySpace, spurring rumors about the possible sale of Facebook to a larger media company.
2005	August 23	Product	Facebook acquires Facebook.com domain for $200,000.
2005	September	Product	Facebook launches a high school version of the website.
2005	October	Product	Facebook launches its photos feature with no restrictions on storage (but without the ability to tag friends).
2005	December	Product	Facebook introduces the ability to tag friends in photos.
2006	March 28	Acquisition talks	A potential acquisition of Facebook is reportedly under negotiations, for $750 million first, then later $2 billion.
2006	April	Userbase	Facebook expands its membership requirements to include corporate employees.
2006	August 22	Product	Facebook launches a blogging feature known as "Facebook Notes".
2006	September 26	Userbase	Membership is opened to anyone.
2006	September 6	Product (news feed)	Facebook launches News Feed. The original news feed is an algorithmically generated and constantly refreshing summary of updates about the activities of one's friends. The concept was relatively new at the time, with Twitter having launched only a few months in advance.
2006	September	Acquisition talks	Facebook discusses with Yahoo! about the latter possibly acquiring the former, for $1 billion.
2007	January 10	Product	Facebook launches m.facebook.com and officially announces mobile support.
2007	May 24	Product	Facebook announces Facebook Platform for developers to build applications on top of Facebook's social graph.
2007	October 24	Funding	Microsoft announces that it will purchase a 1.6% share of Facebook for $240 million, giving Facebook a total implied value of around $15 billion. However, Microsoft also gained ad exclusivity in this deal, so the $15 billion valuation figure is disputed.
2007	November 6	Product (news feed)	Facebook launches Facebook Beacon with 44 partner sites at the time of launch. Beacon is part of Facebook's advertisement system that sends data from external websites to Facebook, for the purpose of allowing targeted advertisements and allowing users to share their activities with their friends. Certain activities on partner sites are published to a user's News Feed. On the same day, Facebook launched Facebook Pages.
2007	November 19	Product	Facebook removes "is" from status updates, allowing users to adopt a more free-form version of status updates.
2008	May	Team	Adam D'Angelo, an early employee and chief technology officer, leaves Facebook.
2008	June	Financial/legal	Facebook settles both lawsuits, ConnectU vs Facebook, Mark Zuckerberg et al. and intellectual property theft, Wayne Chang et al. over The Winklevoss Chang Group's Social Butterfly project. The settlement effectively had Facebook acquiring ConnectU for $20 million in cash and over $1.2 million in shares, valued at $45 million based on $15 billion company valuation.
2008	July 21	Product	Facebook launches a complete site redesign with options for tabbed redesign, and allows users to opt into it. By September 2008, it forces all users to opt-in.
2008	August	Financial/legal	Employees reportedly privately sell their shares to venture capital firms, at a company valuation of between $3.75 billion to $5 billion.
2008	October	Physical location	Facebook sets up its international headquarters in Dublin, Ireland.
2008	November	Product	Facebook launches Facebook Credits to help users purchase Facebook gifts.
2009	February 9	Product	Facebook activates the Facebook like button.
2009	August	Acquisition	Facebook acquires FriendFeed.
2009	September	Financial/legal	Facebook claims that it has turned cash flow positive for the first time.
2009	September 10	Product	Facebook announces a feature whereby people can @-tag friends in their status updates and comments.
2009	September	Product	Facebook shuts down Beacon.
2010	February	Acquisition	Facebook acquires Malaysian contact-importing startup Octazen Solutions.
2010	April 2	Acquisition	Facebook announces the acquisition of photo-sharing service called Divvy-shot for an undisclosed amount.
2010	April 19	Product	Facebook introduces Community Pages, which are Pages that are populated with articles from Wikipedia.
2010	June	Financial/legal	Facebook employees sell shares of the company on SecondMarket at a company valuation of $11.5 billion.
2010	June	Product	Facebook introduces the option to Like individual comments.
2010	October 1	Popular culture	The Social Network, a film about the beginnings of Facebook directed by David Fincher & stars Jesse Eisenberg as Mark is released. The film is met with widespread critical acclaim as well as commercial success; however, Mark Zuckerberg says that the film is a largely inaccurate account of what happened.
2010	December	Product	Facebook launches a redesign that emphasizes the most important parts of someone's life, including one's biographic information, photos, education, work experience, and important relationships. It replaces the tabs at the top of each profile page with links on the left side of the page.
2011	January	Funding	$500 million is invested into Facebook for 1% of the company, placing its worth at $50 billion.
2011	February	Product	Facebook application and content aggregator Pixable estimates that Facebook will host 100 billion photos by summer 2011.
2011	June 28	Competition	Google launches Google+, widely perceived as a competitor to Facebook. Commentators believe that Facebook's subsequent rapid release of new features and improvements may have in part been hastened due to competition from Google+.
2011	July 6	Product	Facebook partners with Skype to add video chat and updates its website interface.
2011	August 9, then October 19	Product	Facebook Messenger is launched for Android and IOS. October 19, 2011 update makes the app available to Blackberry OS.
2011	September, then November 30	Product	Facebook increases the character limit for status update posts from 500 to 5,000 in September and to 63,206 on November 30.
2011	September 14	Product	Facebook allows people to subscribe to non-friends and to set the extent to which they receive updates from their existing friends and people they are subscribing to.
2011	September 15	Product	Facebook partners with Heroku for Facebook application development using the Facebook Platform.
2011	September 22	Product	Facebook launches new UI Timeline in F8 Convention.
2011	October 6	Accessibility	Facebook for SIM, a client/server SIM application developed by international digital security company Gemalto that enables people to access Facebook using the SMS protocol on their mobile phones, without needing a data plan, was released in partnership with select carriers.
2011	October 10	Accessibility	Facebook launches iPad app.
2011	December 21	Product	Facebook login page changes due to Facebook Timeline addition.
2012	January 10	Product (news feed)	Facebook starts showing advertisements (called Featured Posts) in the news feed. The advertisements are generally for pages that one's Facebook friends have engaged with.
2012	April	Acquisition	Facebook acquires Instagram for $1 billion.
2012	May 18	Financial/legal	Facebook IPO: Facebook goes public, negotiating a share price of $38 apiece, valuing the company at $104 billion, the largest valuation to date for a newly listed public company.
2012	June 13	Product	Facebook launches Facebook Exchange (FBX), a real-time bidding ad system where advertisers can bid on users based on third-party websites visited by the users (as tracked by a cookie on the third-party website).
2012	September 20	Product	Facebook launches Custom Audiences, allowing advertisers to target ads to specific users by uploading their customer contact lists.
2012	October	Product	Facebook launches its first Mobile App Install Ad Unit.
2012	October	Userbase	Facebook reaches 1 billion active users.
2013	January 15	Product	Facebook announces and begins rolling out Facebook Graph Search.
2013	January 30, then April 9	Product	Facebook rolls out detailed and fine-grained emoticons to express different actions and emotional states in one's status updates (experimental launch January 30, official launch with universal availability April 9).
2013	March 7	Product (news feed)	Facebook announces major planned changes to the News Feed. However, it is later revealed that Facebook abandoned these changes after getting negative feedback from users.
2013	March 8	Acquisition	Facebook announces that they acquired the team from Storylane, but not the product itself.
2013	April 4, then April 12	Product (mobile-only)	Facebook launches Facebook Home, a user interface layer for Android-compatible phones that provides a replacement home screen that makes it easier for users to browse and post.
2013	April 15	Product	Facebook launches a new timeline with Video Autoplay.
2013	April–July	Product	Facebook launches Stickers, initially only for its iOS apps in April, but later expanding to its web version in July.
2013	June 12, then June 27	Product	Facebook announces support for hashtags, initially only for the web (June 12). Later (June 27), more functionality is added and hashtags are extended to the mobile site and apps.
2013	June 30	Political activism	Zuckerberg joins 700 Facebook employees for the June 2013 Lesbian Gay Bisexual Transgender Pride Celebration march in San Francisco, U.S. The 2013 Pride celebration was especially significant, as it followed a Supreme Court of the United States ruling that deemed the Defense of Marriage Act (DOMA) unconstitutional.
2013	August 20	Userbase/accessibility	Facebook launches Internet.org in collaboration with six cellphone companies (Samsung, Ericsson, MediaTek, Nokia, Opera Software, and Qualcomm). Internet.org aims to bring affordable Internet access to everybody by increasing affordability, increasing efficiency, and facilitating the development of new business models around the provision of Internet access.
2013	September 26	Product	Facebook begins letting people edit their posts and comments after publishing.
2013	September 29	Product	Facebook announces that it will begin rolling out Graph Search for posts and comments.
2013	October 13	Acquisition	Facebook acquires Onavo, an Israeli analytics company, for approximately $120 million.
2013	November 13	Acquisition talks	A number of news outlets reports that Facebook offered to buy Snapchat for US$3 billion but was spurned.
2013	December 18	Financial/legal	Facebook, Zuckerberg, & banks face IPO lawsuit.
2014	January 13	Acquisition	Facebook acquires Branch Media, and it is announced that the team working on the startup will join Facebook to work on conversations products for Facebook that builds on similar ideas as Branch Media's products, while Branch Media's existing products will continue to operate separately. Facebook confirms that the acquisition is a talent acquisition.
2014	January 16	Product	Facebook launches Trending Topics for its web version in the United States, United Kingdom, Canada, India, and Australia. This is based on feedback to a pilot version tested both on the web and mobile starting August 2013.
2014	January 30, then February 3	Product (mobile-only)	On January 30, Facebook announces Facebook Paper, a separate iOS app that provides a newspaper-like or magazine-like experience for reading on the phone, scheduled for launch on February 3. Facebook also announces Facebook Creative Labs, an intra-company effort to have separate teams working on separate mobile apps that specialize in different facets related to the Facebook experience, rather than trying to make changes to Facebook's main web version, mobile version, or its iOS and Android apps, and says that Facebook Paper is the first product of Facebook Creative Labs. Facebook Paper receives mixed reviews, and some commentators note its similarity with Flipboard.
2014	February 4	Milestone	Facebook marks the ten-year anniversary of its launch (February 4, 2004), and Mark Zuckerberg writes a public post about why he is proud of Facebook so far. The Pew Research Center releases a report about increasing Facebook usage by adults to mark the occasion. Many other commentators write articles about Facebook to honor the occasion.
2014	February 4–7	Product	On February 4, on the occasion of its tenth anniversary, Facebook introduces its Look Back feature that creates an automated video for each person looking back on the person's life as recorded on Facebook. On February 7, Facebook adds the ability to edit the Look Back videos.
2014	February 13	Political activism	Facebook opens up many new LGBTQ-friendly gender identity and pronoun options.
2014	February 19	Acquisition	Facebook announces that it is acquiring the Sequoia Capital-backed multi-platform mobile messaging app WhatsApp for US$16 billion ($4 billion in cash, $12 billion in Facebook shares) plus an additional $3 billion in restricted stock units to be granted to WhatsApp's founders and employees that will vest over four years subsequent to closing. According to the announcement, WhatsApp will continue to operate independently, Facebook will continue developing Facebook Messenger, and WhatsApp CEO Jan Koum will join the Facebook board of directors. On February 24, in a keynote address to the Mobile World Congress in Barcelona, Zuckerberg says that the WhatsApp acquisition is part of the Internet.org vision.
2014	March 3	Acquisition	Rumors are circulated that Facebook is buying drone maker Titan Aerospace for $60 million. It is believed that the acquisition will help bolster Facebook's vision with Internet.org. Later, on April 14, 2014, the Wall Street Journal reports that Google is acquiring Titan Aerospace.
2014	March 6	Product (news feed)	Facebook announces that it will begin rollout of a somewhat modified news feed. The changes are along the same lines as those announced in the planned revamp announced March 7, 2013 (that was halted), but are more minor and focused.
2014	March 17	Product	Facebook's face recognition algorithm (DeepFace) reaches near-human accuracy in identifying faces.
2014	March 25	Acquisition	Facebook announces that it is acquiring Oculus VR, Inc., a leading virtual reality company. The amount is reported to be $2 billion in cash and stock.
2014	March 27	Accessibility	Facebook announces a Connectivity Lab as part of the Internet.org initiative, with the goal of bringing the Internet to everybody via drones, using acqhires from Ascenta.
2014	April 24	Product	Facebook announces FB Newswire to help journalists find news on its website.
2014	April 30	Product, accessibility	Facebook launches anonymous login so that people can use apps without giving them their data.
2014	June 18	Product (mobile-only)	Facebook releases Facebook Slingshot, an instant messaging software application for sharing photos and videos with friends, for Android and iOS devices.
2014	July 21	Product	Facebook launches Save, a read-it-later feature that allows users to save links, places, and media pages for later perusal.
2014	September 15 onward	Userbase/controversy	Facebook cracks down on the Facebook profiles of drag queens in San Francisco, asking them to switch to using their real names, and shutting down the accounts of those who refuse to comply. There is considerable pushback, including a planned protest at Facebook headquarters, that is delayed for a meeting with Facebook, but Facebook refuses to budge on its policy. Many people, particularly those in or sympathetic to the LGBTQ community, sign up for competing social network Ello, that does not enforce a real names policy, promises to remain "ad-free and porn-friendly", and aims to have a zero-tolerance policy for hate speech. On October 1, Facebook announced a clarification to its real name policy and said that drag queens could continue operating their accounts. The company clarified that people should use their authentic real-world names but need not use their legal names.
2014	October 6	Acquisition	Facebook officially completes the acquisition of WhatsApp, and WhatsApp CEO Jan Koum agrees to match Mark Zuckerberg's $1 salary.
2014	October 23	Product	Facebook launches pseudonymous app Rooms, where Facebook users can create and participate in forums on any topic and do not need to use their real names. The forthcoming launch of the app had been reported on October 7.
2014	October 31	Accessibility	Facebook creates a custom Tor link, making it easier for people to access Facebook anonymously in locations where it is censored.
2014	November 7	Product (news feed)	Facebook makes it easy for people to unfollow friends and pages they've liked, both while viewing pages in the feed and while reviewing summaries of the most prolific contributors to their feed.
2014	December 8	Product	Facebook rolls out keyword search for all posts, part of Facebook Graph Search, to all US English users on desktop and using iPhones. It is cited as a potential competitor to Yelp and other product recommendation engines and also as a potential way to surface old, embarrassing posts by people.
2014	December 11	Outreach	Facebook CEO Mark Zuckerberg holds his second Q&A, open to the public, about Facebook, where he discusses the dislike button and Facebook's role in promoting viewpoint diversity, helping people share more, and facilitating social and political transparency.
2015	January 5	Acquisition	Facebook acquires Wit.ai, a Y Combinator startup founded 18 months ago to create an API for building voice-activated interfaces.
2015	January 8	Acquisition	Facebook acquires QuickFire Networks, a company that built a custom hardware and software platform for reducing video file sizes and upload times. The Wall Street Journal got the news on January 8, with confirmation later arriving on QuickFire's site.
2015	January 16	Open sourcing	Facebook open sources the Torch library, containing some of its deep learning tools in machine learning, including new code that runs 23 times as fast for training convolutional neural networks as the fastest publicly available code until that time.
2015	January 20	Product (news feed)	Facebook announces that it will show fewer hoaxes in the news feed, and mark items it identifies as potential hoaxes so that readers can view them more critically.
2015	March 17	Product	Facebook introduces a free friend-to-friend payment service within its Messenger app. This is touted by some tech journalists as potential competition for PayPal's Venmo service.
2015	March 25	Product	At the first day of the 2015 F8 conference (a conference for Facebook to make announcements about major product and service changes), the company makes a bunch of announcements, with the unifying theme being that the company wants to be an integrated bunch of apps, each fulfilling a somewhat different role. Currently, the company's leading apps include its main app, Messenger, and externally built and acquired apps such as Instagram and WhatsApp. Specific announcements include making Facebook Messenger more of a platform, a new real-time comments system, embeddable videos, spherical video, Parse for the Internet of Things, updates to ad exchange LiveRail, and analytics for apps.
2015	March 26	Open sourcing	Facebook releases its React native framework for building native apps as open source. This is announced on the second day of the F8 conference.
2015	March 31	Userbase, product	Facebook launches a feature called Scrapbook that allows parents to give their kids an official presence on Facebook even when they are too young to have their own accounts on the network by tagging them in photos. A Scrapbook can be owned by two people who have indicated to Facebook that they are in a relationship. When the kids grow old enough and get their own accounts, they can take over ownership of the Scrapbook and change the privacy settings thereof.
2015	April 22	Product	Facebook launches an Android app called Hello to instantly matches phone numbers of incoming and outgoing calls to Facebook profiles to show information about the caller/callee, block calls from commonly blocked numbers, and search for businesses to call, with initial rollout in the United States, Brazil, and Nigeria. There is no corresponding iOS app, because iOS does not allow apps to interact with phone calls. Commentators compare Facebook Hello to the native Android dialer app and to TrueCaller, an app with crowdsourced data.
2015	April 28 (announcement), April 30 (closure)	Product, platform	Facebook announces that it is shutting down its friends data API, forcing developers to migrate to the Graph API. The company is also allowing for more granular control of data that users may share with apps.
2015	May 12	Product	Facebook launches "Instant Articles" for Publishers. Publishers who use Instant Articles can opt in to have some of their articles shown to mobile users inside Facebook's app itself, without users having to leave the app and visit the customer's website. Initial launch partners include BuzzFeed, the New York Times, National Geographic and six others. The article as displayed on Facebook mimics the article on the website in terms of layout, and Instant Articles allows for correct attribution and analytics with tools such as Google Analytics, Omniture, and Comscore, in addition to publishers benefiting from Facebook's own analytics. Publishers can choose to have only a subset of their content available as Instant Articles, and Facebook handles the porting of the article to the Instant Article format itself. BuzzFeed praised Facebook for complying with its requests for compatibility with analytics tracking, and said the process was very collaborative throughout. Load times are claimed to be ten times faster than the mobile web. Publishers can keep all the ad revenue if using their own ads, but Facebook gets a 30% cut if the ads are shown by Facebook.
2015	May 29	Product (news feed)	Facebook confirms official support for GIFs. Autoplay settings for GIFs would be the same as those for videos: users who have video autoplay set to on (the default setting) will have GIFs autoplay when they scroll to the GIF in their news feed. Others can play the GIF manually by clicking the GIF button on the feed item with the GIF.
2015	June–August	Product	Facebook adds more features for pages to make it easier for businesses to use them. These include: allowing pages to display how quickly they respond to messages, allowing pages to send saved replies to messages, allowing pages to use private messages for customer support, and adding buy button integration to pages.
2015	June–July	Product (news feed)	Facebook makes changes to its news feed algorithm in a few different directions. It relinquishes some control to users allowing them to dictate what they see first in the news feed. Also, it announces that it will start using information on how long people hover on a particular item in their news feed to gauge their level of interest in the item, in addition to the more explicit signals it currently uses (likes, comments, shares).
2015	August	Product	On August 5, Facebook launches live-streaming, initially restricted only to celebrities. Subsequently, on August 12, it announces that the feature will be made available to journalists and those with verified profiles.
2015	August 26	Product	Facebook begins rolling out a human- and AI-powered virtual assistant called "M". M is available through Facebook's Messenger app, and is capable of performing tasks on behalf of users, including placing restaurant reservations and booking travel. At launch, M is only available to a small group of testers, and in April 2016 Facebook would confirm that it could be years before M is broadly available.
2015	August 27	Userbase	Facebook announces that it has hit the milestone of 1 billion users accessing it on a single day.
2015	October 27	Accessibility	Facebook announces an initiative called 2G Tuesdays. With this initiative, Facebook engineers can opt in to access Facebook at 2G speeds for an hour every Tuesday (thus partly mimicking the experience of a nonnegligible fraction of Internet users in developing countries). The goal is to make Facebook engineers better understand the challenges of using Facebook with poor Internet speeds, and in turn help improve the Facebook experience for these users.
2015	December	Product	Facebook announces that it will add a feature for booking a ride through its messaging application. Users of Facebook Messenger in the U.S. will be able to summon an Uber car with a few taps.
2016	January – March	Product	Facebook Live that was originally launched in August 2015 and limited to celebrities, becomes available to all U.S. iPhone users on January 28. On February 18, the global rollout begins. It becomes available to U.S. Android users in the week following February 26. Starting March 1, Facebook starts pushing live content more compared to older content. Commentators describe Facebook Live as marking Facebook's entry into the live-streaming space, competing with Twitter-owned Periscope.
2016	February 24	Product	Facebook releases Facebook Reactions to the general public. The feature allows people to use five additional reactions beyond just the "like" action to convey their reaction to a post. The new reactions are "Love", "Haha", "Wow", "Sad", and "Angry" (another reaction, "Yay", that was used in initial testing of the feature, has been removed). Although the names differ across languages, the emoticons used are the same across languages. Each user can add at most one reaction to a post. An early version of Reactions was released in October 2015 in Ireland and Spain.
2016	March 18	Product	Facebook provide "Basketball Game" function in Messenger.
2016	April 12 and 13	Product	Facebook F8 for 2016 includes a number of announcements about the product roadmap. Key highlights include: Messenger chatbots and a new bot engine, open source virtual reality camera, more tools for Facebook apps and Facebook Live, allowing businesses to send sponsored messages to people who have messaged them in the past, more changes around improving rights management for videos, and increased support for React Native from Microsoft and Samsung.
2016	April 21	Product (news feed)	Facebook announces that it is updating its news feed algorithm to take into account the time that a person spends reading the article, off Facebook (using various techniques to control for load time and article length). In the previous set of updates rolled out in June and July 2015, Facebook had started taking into account the time people spend viewing the item in their news feed, but the new change takes into account the user's activity outside Facebook. The change is part of Facebook's Feed Quality Program, and is a result of research showing that people's activity on Facebook failed to fully capture the extent to which they were interested in particular items. Commentators believe that this is likely to lead to a significant reduction in the circulation of misleading clickbait on the social network.
2016	April 27 and 28	Financial/legal, userbase	Facebook releases its 2016 Q1 earnings report, showing an increase in earnings to 77 cents per share up from 42 cents per share a year ago. The earnings beat analyst expectations, and cause Facebook share prices to soar, leading its market cap to exceed that of Johnson & Johnson. Facebook also reports an increase of 57% in advertising revenue to $5.2 billion, with mobile advertising now accounting for 82% of advertising revenue. It also reports a year-over-year increase in daily active users by 16% to 1.09 billion and in monthly active users by 15% to 1.65 billion. Facebook also announces a proposal to create a new class of nonvoting stock.
2016	May	Product, controversy	Gizmodo publishes a series of articles about alleged problems with Facebook's Trending Topics section, including lack of integration of the Trending Topics team with Facebook's overall culture and workforce, discretion vested in that team to make decisions (including the ability to artificially inject content into Trending Topics even if it has not been trending so far), and potential for bias in the way the discretion is exercised, with a particular focus on bias against conservatism. The controversy is picked up by other news media, the United States Senate Committee, and many conservative outlets. Facebook defends itself against the allegations, but also invites leading conservatives, including United States Republican presidential primary frontrunner Donald Trump, libertarian-leaning conservative commentator Glenn Beck (who is very impressed with Facebook's actions), and CNN commentator S. E. Cupp, for a meeting to discuss and address concerns. On May 23, Facebook announces changes to its Trending Topics section, and releases a 28-page document on the subject.
2016	May 25	Product	Facebook announces that it is shutting down Facebook Exchange (FBX), its desktop ad exchange. The reasons cited include that FBX makes a very small share of Facebook's ad revenue, and that it is of limited utility because is purely desktop-based, and any successful ad campaign must include mobile, that people are increasingly using.
2016	June 15	Product	Facebook introduces the secret Messenger soccer game, similar to the basketball game.
2016	June 29	Product (news feed)	Facebook publishes its list of "News Feed Values" that will guide its decisions and algorithms for the news feed. A core value listed is that friends and family come first, and Facebook announces that it is increasing the circulation of content about friends and family relative to publisher content.
2016	August 4	Product (news feed)	Facebook announces algorithm changes that penalize "clickbait" titles, based on a score assigned by a machine-learned model. The model is trained based on cases where users like a link, click it, and then immediately bounce and unlike pages. The algorithm is applied both at the web domain level and at the Facebook page level.
2016	August 11	Product (advertising)	Facebook and AdBlock Plus enter into an escalating war. AdBlock Plus tries to block advertisements and sponsored content on Facebook's site, but Facebook releases a workaround, to which AdBlock Plus releases its own workaround. Facebook's argument is that ad blockers are a crude solution, and Facebook's approach of giving users more fine-grained control over the content they see in the feed is superior. AdBlock Plus disagrees with the assessment and says ad blockers should not be blamed for users' desire to have an ad-free experience. The ad blocking war continues into September and discussion continues into November, with Facebook reportedly having boosted its ad revenue owing to its blocking of ad blockers.
2016	October 3	Product	In the US, UK, Australia, and New Zealand, Facebook launches Marketplace, a way to buy and sell items through Facebook. Marketplace appears as a tab in the mobile app. The feature has been compared to Craigslist.
2016	November 30	Product	Facebook launches in select countries Instant Games on Messenger and Facebook News Feed, which allows users to play games without installing new apps. The games are provided via HTML5. At launch, Instant Games does not allow game developers to place ads or in-game payments in games, but Facebook commits to allowing eventual monetization. The platform initially has 17 games.
2016	December 15	Product (news feed)	Facebook announces a set of news feed updates to combat the problem of fake news and hoaxes. These include more streamlining for users reporting fake news, a partnership with signatory organizations to Poynter's International Fact Checking Code of Principles to examine items reported as fake, learning from lower share rates for people who view the article that the item might be fake, and warnings to users when they share news that is disputed or possibly fake.
2017	January 11	Outreach	Facebook introduces the Facebook Journalism Project, an effort to bolster its relationship with media and news organizations and journalists.
2017	end of January	Product	Facebook begins integrating the Messenger interface into the messages inbox, replacing the old inbox interface. This change makes the Facebook messages inbox interface similar to that seen on messenger.com.
2017	February 15	Product	In the United States and Canada, Facebook launches a feature to search for jobs. The feature allows businesses to post job openings through the status update composer, and allows users to apply to those job postings.
2017	February 16		Mark Zuckerberg (Facebook's principal founder and CEO) pens a long note on his personal Facebook titled "Building Global Community" that talks about supportive, safe, informed, civically engaged, and inclusive community. The note receives widespread discussion, including comparisons with a political manifesto.
2017	March 23	Product (messaging)	Facebook adds reactions and mentions inside Messenger (both the app and the web experience).
2017	April 27	Accessibility	Facebook launches Messenger Lite in over 100 additional countries.
2017	May 3	Product	Facebook adds reactions to comments. Reactions were previously available on messages (sent via Messenger) and Facebook posts but not in comments.
2017	May 21	Controversy	The Guardian publishes The Facebook Files, leaked Facebook documents detailing Facebook's moderation policies for graphic depictions of sex and violence as well as racist, sexist, and hate speech. The revelations lead to public discussion of the specifics of Facebook's policies, as well as calls on Facebook to be more transparent.
2017	March 30, May 24	Product (fundraising)	Facebook Fundraising is launched. On March 30, the fundraising tools are introduced in beta. On May 24, the product exits beta and is available in the United States for all users over 18 years of age.
2017	June 27	Userbase	Facebook reaches 2 billion monthly active users.
2017	August 18	Product (messaging)	Facebook Messenger rolls out rich text formatting, with support for bold, italics, inline code, and strike-through. In addition, LaTeX math expressions are implemented through KaTeX.
2017	September 7	Userbase/controversy	Facebook blocks 470 fake accounts after claiming them to be linked to Russia's Internet Research Agency, which is suspect to have bought thousands of ads during the United States presidential campaign. The company claims having discovered a Russian-funded campaign to promote divisive social and political messages on its network.
2017	September 27	Controversy	United States president Donald Trump declares on Twitter that Facebook was always "anti-Trump". However, the claim wouldn't have sequel in the stock market, with Facebook's share price on the rise.
2017	October 11	Outage	Facebook and Instagram experience widespread outage impacting a large number of users' ability to access the services across the world, with the areas experiencing the most problems appearing to be the West and East Coasts of North America, and various parts of Europe, with parts of South America and Southeast Asia getting errors as well.
2017	October 31	Staff	Under intensifying pressure from legislators and consumers to clean up its site, Facebook pledges to double its 10,000-person safety and security staff by end of 2018.
2017	November 8	Program launch	In an effort to combat revenge porn, Facebook encourages users in Australia to submit their nude photos to a pilot project designed to prevent intimate images from being shared without consent. Adults who have shared nude or sexually explicit photos with someone online, and who are worried about unauthorised distribution, under the program can securely send the photos to themselves via Messenger, a process that allows Facebook to "hash" them, creating an identifier which would block any further distribution on Facebook, Instagram and Messenger as a pre-emptive strike against revenge porn, a common method of abuse and exploitation online.
2017	November 16	Product	In an effort to combat fake news and promote authentic, fact-based journalism, Facebook launches Trust Indicators, a tool to help users determine how each particular publication works. The measure is also taken by Google and Twitter.
2017	November 16	Product	After live videos having skyrocketed on Facebook in the last months, the social network launches Facebook Creator, an app for mobile video posts offering influencers Live Creative Kit for adding intros and outros to broadcasts, a unified inbox of Facebook and Instagram comments plus Messenger chats, cross-posting to Twitter and expansive analytics.
2017	December 3	Staff	Facebook opens new office in London, expecting to hire 800 new staff. Interiorly designed by Frank Gehry, the office would be Facebook's biggest engineering hub outside the United States.
2017	December 4	Product	Facebook launches Messenger Kids, a version of Messenger for children from ages six to 12. The app does not require a Facebook account (illegal for this range of age). Rather, parents are able to manage a child's Messenger Kids app from their Facebook account, controlling which friends and family members the child is able to contact.
2017	December 19	Product	In an effort to prevent people from impersonating others, Facebook expands its use of facial recognition technology by introducing new tool that would alert people that a friend, or a friend of a friend, uploaded a photo of them, even if they haven't been tagged in the picture.
2018	January 11	Acquisition	Facebook acquires personalized image search engine Dreambit.
2018	January 23	Acquisition	Facebook acquires Boston-based biometric ID verification startup Confirm.io, which offers a system for verifying the authenticity of ID cards, biometrics and facial recognition.
2018	January 25	Controversy	Facebook admits to the United States Senate that its software, in some cases, recommended content produced by Russian propaganda operatives around the time of the 2016 presidential election; stating however that it has found insignificant overlap between Russian-produced content and pages created by the Trump's election campaign.
2018	January 30	Policy	In an intentionally broad policy aimed at stopping scammers, Facebook bans all ads promoting cryptocurrencies, including bitcoin and initial coin offerings.
2018	January 31	Userbase	Facebook reports losing daily users for the first time ever in the United States and Canada. However, globally, the number of people using Facebook daily rose 14% compared to the previous year, but falling by 700,000 people in the US and Canada for the first time.
2018	March 17–26	Controversy	A whistleblower reveals that British political consulting firm Cambridge Analytica harvested 50 million Facebook profiles and used personal information taken without authorisation in early 2014 to build a system that could profile individual voters in the United States, to target them with personalized political advertisements. On March 26, the United States Federal Trade Commission (FTC) announces it is investigating Facebook's privacy practices following the revelations. The scandal would affect deeply the image of Facebook, with a loss of nearly US$50 billion in market capitalization since the data scandal.
2018	April 10–11	Legal	Mark Zuckerberg attends his first congressional hearings at Capitol Hill, Washington, D.C. testifying about controversies over Facebook data privacy, and being questioned for almost 10 hours in two days by senators and representatives over the company's privacy policies. On the first day, Zuckerberg repeatedly apologizes and promises privacy reforms on Facebook, but also pointedly defends his company against the threat of new legislation. Facing tougher questions on the second day regarding Facebook policies about user privacy, data collection, political bias and the social network's business model, Zuckerberg would reject suggestions from Congress members that Facebook users did not have enough control over their data. However, he would explain plans to tighten data policies, protect users from further leaks and become more transparent about who's advertising on his site.
2018	April 26	Legal	Facebook CTO Mike Schroepfer is grilled for five hours by the UK Parliament; he is a stand-in for CEO Mark Zuckerberg. Among other things, in the testimony he gives estimates of Facebook's numbers of "dark ads" on Facebook, in connection with consumer advocate Martin Lewis whose name was used by malicious advertisers on advertisements for spam and misleading products.
2023	November 7	Legal	A former Meta employee, Arturo Bejar, testified before the United States Senate Judiciary Subcommittee on Privacy, Technology and the Law, alleging that Facebook executives, including CEO Mark Zuckerberg, had ignored warnings about the harmful effects of Instagram on teens for years.

== See also ==
- Timeline of social media
