= WaveGroup Sound =

Music production company

WaveGroup Sound is the sound design team for Meta Platforms. It is formerly a music production company known for its creation of music for numerous video games.

== History ==
WaveGroup Sound was originally co-founded by engineer James Allen and musician Will Littlejohn in Brisbane, California, doing audio post production for film, commercials, and corporate training videos. WaveGroup relocated to the Silicon Valley in 1996, with Littlejohn later acquiring full ownership of the company.

WaveGroup's work shifted to video game music and sound design, and by the early 2000s the company was the leading producer of music for interactive music video games, producing music for popular series like Karaoke Revolution, Rock Band, Guitar Hero, and others.

WaveGroup's sound design work includes sounds for the Jawbone Era Bluetooth headset and JAMBOX Bluetooth speaker. The company also did Interactive Voice Response (IVR) work for major corporations such as American Express and Fidelity Investments and others.

WaveGroup produced in-app notification sounds for Meta's Messenger, Slingshot, and Instagram Bolt instant messaging platforms, and in 2014 the company became Meta's (then Facebook Inc.) official in-house sound design team.

== Partial music game portfolio ==
WaveGroup produced many or all of the songs or song covers for some of these video game titles.

- Beatmania (US) / Beatmania IIDX 11: IIDX RED (JP)
- Brooktown High
- Guitar Hero
- Guitar Hero II
- Guitar Hero Encore: Rocks the 80s
- Guitar Hero III: Legends of Rock
- Guitar Hero: Aerosmith
- Guitar Hero: On Tour
- Guitar Hero World Tour (DLC Only)
- Samba de Amigo
- Rock Band (DLC packs as well)
- Dance Dance Revolution Extreme 2
- Dance Dance Revolution Hottest Party
- Dance Dance Revolution Ultramix 4
- Dance Dance Revolution Universe
- Dance Dance Revolution Universe 3

== Awards ==
- 2005 Spike Video Game Awards - Best Soundtrack for Guitar Hero
- 2005 Game Developers Choice Awards - Best Audio for Guitar Hero
- 2006 AIAS Interactive Achievement Award for Outstanding Achievement in Soundtrack for Guitar Hero
- 2006 BAFTA Games Awards - Soundtrack for Guitar Hero
- 2006 Spike Video Game Awards - Best Soundtrack for Guitar Hero II
- 2006 Game Developers Choice Awards - Best Audio for Guitar Hero II
- 2007 Spike Video Game Awards - Best Soundtrack for Rock Band
