= HTC Salsa =

2011 Android smartphone

- HTC
- Manufacturer: HTC
- Type: Smartphone
- First released: 15 February 2011
- Discontinued: Yes
- Successor: HTC First
- Dimensions: 109.1×58.9×12.3 mm (4.30×2.32×0.48 in)
- Weight: 120 g (4 oz) with battery
- Operating system: Android Gingerbread 2.3.3
- CPU: 800MHz Qualcomm Snapdragon MSM7227 (ARMv6 rev5)
- GPU: Adreno 205
- Memory: 512 MB of RAM
- Storage: microSD support
- Battery: Li-ion 1520 mAh
- Rear camera: 5-megapixel camera with Auto Focus, LED flash
- Display: 3.4 in (86 mm) diagonal 320x480 px HVGA
- Media: MP3/AAC+/WAV/WMA, MP4/H.264
- Connectivity: HSDPA/HSUPA, Wi-Fi(IEEE 802.11b/g/n)
- Website: Official website

The HTC Salsa is an Android smartphone that was announced by HTC in June 2011 at the Mobile World Congress.

The HTC Salsa is designed and dedicated for Facebook and Social Networking as the Facebook button indicates. The Facebook button is for sharing statuses, pictures or videos on Facebook in one touch.

== Specification ==
- Processor = 800 MHz processor / MSM7227 Turbo (ARMv6)
- Memory = 512 MB ROM (onboard) + microSD slot (up to 32 GB) / 512 MB RAM
- Display = 3.4 in (86 mm) diagonal
  320x480 px HVGA Capacitive TFT touch-screen
- Camera (Primary) = 5 MP color with LED flash
- Camera (Secondary) = VGA
- Connectivity = 800/2100 900/2100 MHz on HSDPA/WCDMA, Quad-band GSM/GPRS/EDGE:850/900/1800/1900 MHz, Bluetooth 3.0, Wi-Fi (IEEE 802.11b/g/n), 3.5 mm stereo
- Software = Android 2.3.3 (Gingerbread) with HTC Sense.

== Features ==
- Android OS, v2.3 (Gingerbread)
- Accelerometer, proximity, compass
- A-GPS, SMS (threaded view), MMS, Email, Push Email, IM
- HTML
- Radio Stereo FM radio with RDS
- Facebook dedicated key
- SNS integration
- Google Search, Maps, Gmail
- YouTube, Google Talk, Picasa integration
- MP3/AAC+/WAV/WMA player
- MP4/H.264 player
- Organizer
- Document viewer/editor
- Voice memo
- Predictive text input

== See also ==
- Google Nexus
- HTC ChaCha
