= Facebook Paper =

Standalone mobile app by Facebook

Paper
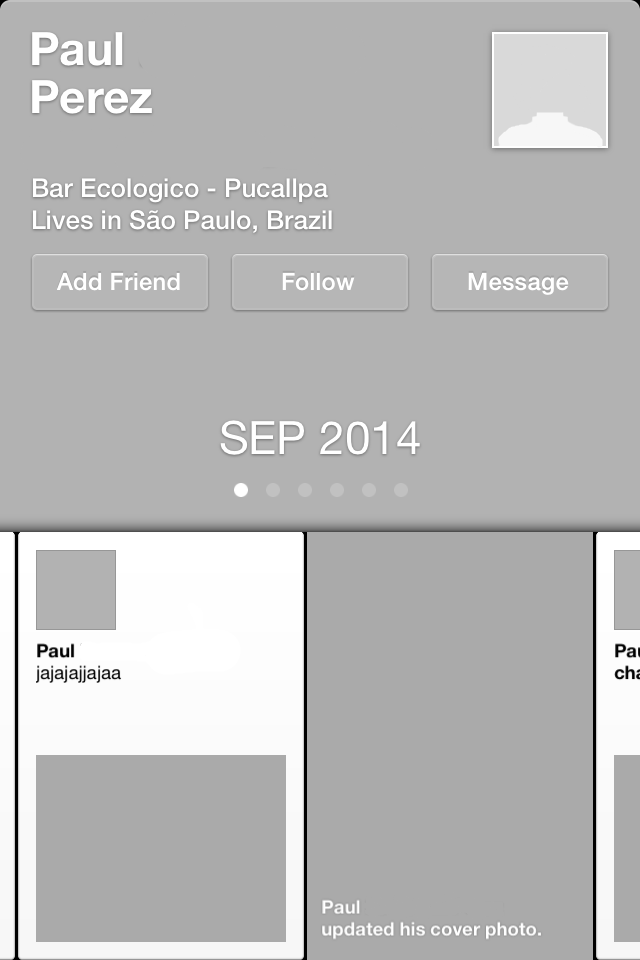
- Screenshot of App
- Developer: Facebook, Inc.
- Release: February 3, 2014
- Final release: 1.2.6 / March 11, 2015; 11 years ago
- Operating system: iOS 7 and later
- Size: 49.7 MB
- Available in: English

Facebook Paper was a standalone mobile app created by Facebook, only for iOS, that intended to serve as a phone-based equivalent of a newspaper or magazine. The app was announced by Facebook on January 30, 2014, and released for iOS on February 3, 2014. The iPhone app appeared in the iOS App Store as "Paper – stories from Facebook"; there was no iPad version. Facebook shut Paper down on July 29, 2016.

== Broader framework ==
Along with announcing the release of Facebook Paper, Facebook also announced Facebook Creative Labs, an intra-company effort to have separate teams working on separate mobile apps that specialize in different facets related to the Facebook experience, rather than trying to make changes to Facebook's main web version, mobile version, or its main iOS and Android apps. Facebook Paper was the first product of Facebook Creative Labs. Later on more apps were launched: Slingshot, Mentions, Rooms, Facebook Groups, Riff, Hello and Moments.

== Features ==
Some of the stated features of Facebook Paper that distinguish it from Facebook's past efforts and its other apps:

- The use of a grid structure to have a large amount of content discoverable by scrolling without overwhelming the reader in any one display.
- The use of tilting as a separate gesture used to load high-resolution photos, play videos, and load more details of status updates. Tilting is distinguishing from finger-based scrolling, that simply goes to the next item in the grid.
- A magazine-like texture in the display.
- A mix of curation by editors and the use of social signals (including Facebook likes and shares) in deciding what content to show. Content is not limited to content from friends. However, this may not be that different from Flipboard and other news aggregation services.

Facebook Paper has also experimented with content collaboration with third parties. The first such collaboration was with TED, and was announced on March 17, 2014.

== Reception ==
Rachel Meltz, writing for Technology Review, wrote that Facebook Paper was better than Facebook's main app and contrasted it favorably with Facebook's previous efforts at mobile, such as Facebook Home. Dieter Bohn, writing for The Verge, similarly said that with Paper, Facebook "blew its own iPhone app out of the water." Ellis Hamburger reviewed Facebook Paper in a video review as well as an article for The Verge, calling it "the best Facebook app ever." Kyle Vanhemert reviewed the app in Wired Magazine, writing: "The most radical aspect of Paper is that it isn't predicated entirely on your friends." Josh Constine wrote for TechCrunch: "This ain't your mama's Facebook. Paper is almost too modern, or maybe it's just years ahead of its time."

Semil Shah, writing for TechCrunch, reviewed Paper in light of Facebook's broader mobile strategy, wondering whether Paper's fate would be similar to that of the fairly successful Facebook Messenger or the highly unsuccessful Facebook Poke (Facebook's in-house Snapchat clone). Jennifer Van Grove discussed Paper and the importance of Facebook Creative Labs in Facebook's long-term strategy in an article for CNet. Lance Ulanoff, writing for Mashable, wrote that although Facebook Paper was content-focused, Facebook was still trying to distinguish itself from a media company and was focused on enabling people to create content rather than simply focused on the reading experience. Matt Buchanan wrote in The New Yorker that "Facebook's move away from the stream is part of what seems to be a shift toward flexibility and experimentation" and that "[Paper] shows that the company finally thinks that it knows us well enough to show us everything one piece a time." Inside Facebook published "10 first reactions" to Facebook Paper describing what it revealed about Facebook.

FiftyThree, Inc. the maker of a sketchbook app also called Paper, contacted Facebook asking them to not use the Paper name so as to avoid brand confusion.

=== Comparison with Flipboard ===
An article by Jason Abbruzzese in Mashable noted the similarities of Facebook Paper with existing news reading and aggregation services such as Flipboard, and sought reactions from existing news reading services on whether they considered Facebook Paper a threat to their business model. Karissa Bell later wrote an article for Mashable comparing Facebook Paper and Flipboard on a number of aspects.

The following differences were noted between Facebook Paper and Flipboard, shortly after the launch of Paper in February 2014:

- Flipboard gives more prominence to content, whereas Facebook Paper gives more prominence to social actions, such as interacting with friends and sharing with one's timeline.
- Flipboard is more of an aggregator, giving users considerable flexibility in what sources they can use to construct their own newspaper. Facebook Paper, on the other hand, is a curator—the permissible news categories and the sources within each category are chosen by Facebook, and users' main flexibility is in choosing which of Facebook's predefined sections is of interest to them.
- Facebook Paper puts discovery first, telling users what stories they need to pay attention to.
- Facebook Paper only integrates with Facebook, whereas Flipboard integrates with other venues for sharing including Twitter, Tumblr, Instagram, and LinkedIn. Facebook no longer makes users' newsfeeds available in Flipboard other than content from followed pages and groups.
- Facebook Paper is only available for the iPhone, whereas Flipboard is available for the iPhone, iPad, Android, Windows Phone 8, BlackBerry, Kindle Fire, Nook and web.

== Further progress ==
In April 2014, about 2.5 months after the release of Facebook Paper, Facebook announced that Paper users browse 80 stories a day, and that Facebook had made changes that allowed people to use Facebook Paper in place of the Facebook iOS app. In late April 2014, Facebook open-sourced the animation engine that powered Facebook Paper.

== Discontinuation ==
On June 30, 2016, Facebook announced that support for Paper will end, and users will no longer be able to log into the app after July 29, 2016.
