= Onavo =

Israeli mobile web analytics company owned by Meta Platforms

Onavo, Inc.
- Type: Subsidiary
- Industry: Software
- Founded: 2010
- Founders: Guy Rosen; Roi Tiger
- Defunct: 2019
- Headquarters: Israel
- Products: Onavo Count; Onavo Extend; Onavo Protect
- Services: Onavo Insights
- Parent: Meta Platforms
- Website: onavo.com

Onavo, Inc. was an Israeli mobile web analytics company that was purchased by Facebook, Inc. (now Meta Platforms), who changed the company's name to Facebook Israel. The company primarily performed its activities via consumer mobile apps, including the virtual private network (VPN) service Onavo Protect, which analysed web traffic sent through the VPN to provide statistics on the usage of other apps.

Guy Rosen and Roi Tiger founded Onavo in 2010. In October 2013, Onavo was acquired by Facebook, which used Onavo's analytics platform to monitor competitors. This influenced Facebook to make various business decisions, including its 2014 acquisition of WhatsApp.

Since the acquisition, Onavo was frequently classified as being spyware, as the VPN was used to monetize application usage data collected within an allegedly privacy-focused environment. In August 2018, Facebook was forced to pull Onavo Protect from the iOS App Store due to violations of Apple's policy forbidding apps from collecting data on the usage of other apps. In February 2019, in response to criticism over a Facebook market research program employing similar techniques (including, in particular, being targeted towards teens), Onavo announced that it would close the Android version of Protect as well.

== History ==
Onavo was founded in 2010 by Roi Tiger and Guy Rosen. Onavo won multiple awards in 2011. The company received first prize at the Mobile Beat 2011 conference hosted by VentureBeat, and the award for most innovative app at the 2011 International Startup Festival, as well as being selected as the "Best Mobile Startup" by The Next Web.

Onavo had two rounds of funding: the first was a Series A investment for $3 million from Magma Venture Partners and Sequoia Capital in May 2011. The second was a Series B investment of $13 million from Magma Ventures, Sequoia Capital, and Horizons Ventures. Onavo's sale to Facebook is one of the top exits for Magma Venture Partners and other Israeli venture capital firms.

On October 13, 2013, Facebook bought Onavo for approximately $120 million.

In March 2014, Adi Soffer Teeni was appointed CEO of Facebook Israel.

In an email dated June 9, 2016, Facebook CEO Mark Zuckerberg directed engineers at his company to find a method of obtaining "reliable analytics" about Snapchat, which he noted that Facebook lacked due to Snapchat's network traffic being encrypted. The solution Facebook engineers proposed to Zuckerberg's directive was to use Onavo, which allowed the company to read network traffic on a device prior to its being encrypted, thereby giving the company the ability "to measure detailed in-app activity" and to collect analytics on Snapchat app usage from devices on which Onavo was installed. It did this by creating "fake digital certificates to impersonate trusted Snapchat, YouTube, and Amazon analytics servers to redirect and decrypt secure traffic from those apps for Facebook’s strategic analysis." The program, which was named "Project Ghostbusters" in reference to Snapchat's ghost-shaped logo, was later expanded to include Amazon and YouTube.

In February 2018, it was reported that Facebook had begun to include advertising for the Onavo Protect app within the Facebook app for iOS users in the United States. This led to denouncements of the app by media outlets, who classified Onavo as spyware because it is used by Facebook to monetize usage habits within a privacy-focused environment, and because the app listing did not contain a prominent disclosure of Facebook's ownership. The app's listings were later amended to disclaim that Onavo Protect may collect information on app and website usage to improve Facebook products and services.

In August 2018, Facebook pulled Onavo Protect from the iOS App Store after pressure by Apple, who declared it a violation of guidelines barring apps from harvesting data from other apps on a user's device.

On February 21, 2019, in the wake of renewed controversy over the service due to the related Facebook Research program, Facebook announced that it would sunset Onavo Protect VPN and pull its app from Google Play Store. Effective immediately, the service ceased collecting personal data.

The Australian Competition & Consumer Commission (ACCC) initiated legal proceedings against Facebook on December 16, 2020, alleging that Facebook engaged in "false, misleading or deceptive conduct" by using personal data collected from Onavo "for its own commercial purposes" contrary to Onavo's privacy-oriented marketing. Facebook responded that it was "always clear about the information we collect and how it is used", and would defend itself in court. In July 2023 Australia's Federal Court ordered Facebook's owner to pay A$20 million for failing to disclose how Onavo would be used to collect data, as well as A$400,000 to cover the ACCC's legal fees.

In 2016, Jordana Cutler, who had previously served as the director of Ambassador Ron Dermer's office and as an advisor to Prime Minister Benjamin Netanyahu, was appointed as Public Policy Director for Facebook Israel. In September 2016, Israel's Minister of Justice Ayelet Shaked and Minister of Internal Security Gilad Erdan introduced a bill aimed at curbing online incitement and hate speech, imposing restrictions on the dissemination of illegal and offensive content on the Internet and social media platforms. Dubbed the "Facebook Law" by the media, the proposal garnered widespread support within the government. Between 2016 and 2018, it passed through various stages of approval: first gaining endorsement from the Ministerial Committee for Legislation, then advancing through preliminary and first readings in the Knesset Plenum, making it eligible for consideration in the Constitution, Law and Justice Committee. In July 2018, the committee greenlit the bill for its second and third readings, setting the stage for final ratification by the Knesset plenary. However, at the eleventh hour, Prime Minister Benjamin Netanyahu unexpectedly intervened to halt the process. In response, Nissan Slomiansky, chairman of the Constitution, Law, and Justice Committee, asserted that the sudden reversal was prompted by pressure from "large forces" with vested interests. Media reports speculated that Jordana Cutler, Netanyahu's former advisor who serves as Facebook's Public Policy Director in Israel, played a pivotal role in influencing the Prime Minister's decision to block the legislation. Lawyer Itai Leshem, claimed during his campaign in the 2024 Israeli Labor Party leadership election, that this was part of an ongoing alleged bribe between PM Netanyahu and Facebook.

== Products ==
Onavo maintained consumer-oriented utility apps, including Onavo Count, which tracked bandwidth usage by apps, as well as Onavo Extend and Onavo Protect, which were VPN services for data compression and security, respectively.

In 2013, the company launched Onavo Insights, a mobile analytics platform that tracked the market share and active usage of apps using data obtained from Onavo's consumer apps. In 2016, CEO Mark Zuckerberg tasked Facebook employees with developing a means to decrypt the network traffic of the video sharing app Snapchat for analytics purposes, citing "how quickly they're growing". A method of intercepting the traffic was developed and proposed by the Onavo team; Facebook internally referred to its analytics scheme as "Project Ghostbusters"—an allusion to Snapchat's logo and the film franchise.

In August 2017, The Wall Street Journal reported that since the acquisition of Onavo by Facebook, the company had been using the company's data to monitor Snapchat and other startups that are performing "unusually well". This data influenced Facebook to acquire WhatsApp in 2014, and plan a video chat app to rival Houseparty in 2017.

== Facebook Research ==
On January 29, 2019, TechCrunch published a report detailing "Project Atlas"—an internal market research program employed by Facebook since 2016. It invited users between the ages of 13 and 35 to install the Facebook Research app—allegedly a rebranded version of Onavo Protect—on their device, to collect data on their app usage, web browsing history, web search history, location history, personal messages, photos, videos, emails, and Amazon order history. Participants received up to $20 per-month to participate in the program, which was promoted to teenagers via targeted advertising on Instagram and Snapchat. Facebook Research is administered by third-party beta testing services, including Applause and BetaBound, and requires users to install a Facebook root certificate on their phone. On iOS, this is prohibited by Apple's Enterprise Developer License Agreement, as the methods used are intended solely for use by a company's employees (for use cases such as internal software specific to their environment, and internal pre-release versions of apps).

=== Responses ===
Facebook initially responded by claiming that Facebook Research did not violate Apple's developer license agreement, and denied that the program was intended to bypass the rules that banned Onavo Protect from the iOS App Store, nor was intended to replace Onavo. Facebook later announced that it would discontinue the Facebook Research program on iOS. Facebook Research remains available for Android devices.

On January 30, 2019, Apple revoked Facebook's Enterprise Developer Program certificates, which caused all of the company's internal iOS apps (including beta versions of its public software, as well as internal apps relating to Facebook's workplace) to become inoperable. Apple's public relations team stated that "Facebook has been using their membership to distribute a data-collecting app to consumers, which is a clear breach of their agreement with Apple", and that the certificates were revoked "to protect our users and their data". Apple reinstated the certificates on January 31.

Of particular concern was that users as young as 13 were allowed to participate in the program. Connecticut Senator Richard Blumenthal criticized Facebook Research, stating "wiretapping teens is not research, and it should never be permissible. This is yet another astonishing example of Facebook’s complete disregard for data privacy and eagerness to engage in anti-competitive behavior." Massachusetts Senator Ed Markey announced that he would introduce a bill to strengthen the Children's Online Privacy Protection Act (COPPA), and said that it "is inherently manipulative to offer teens money in exchange for their personal information when younger users don’t have a clear understanding how much data they're handing over and how sensitive it is." Virginia Senator Mark Warner published an open letter to Mark Zuckerberg, in which he declared that he was "working on legislation to require individualized, informed consent in all instances of behavioral and market research conducted by large platforms on users".

== Facebook Study ==
After discontinuing Onavo Protect and Facebook Research, Facebook released yet another market research app named Facebook Study (also known as Study or Study from Facebook) on June 11, 2019. According to the company, Study is restricted to Facebook users who are at least 18 years old and does not use a VPN or a root certificate to conduct its data collection. Study participants are paid through PayPal.

== Litigation ==
In 2020, a class-action lawsuit was filed on behalf of Facebook users, alleging that the company "exploited the rich data it deceptively extracted from its users to identify nascent competitors and then 'acquire, copy, or kill' these firms".
