= HTC ChaCha =

2011 smartphone model with a physical keyboard

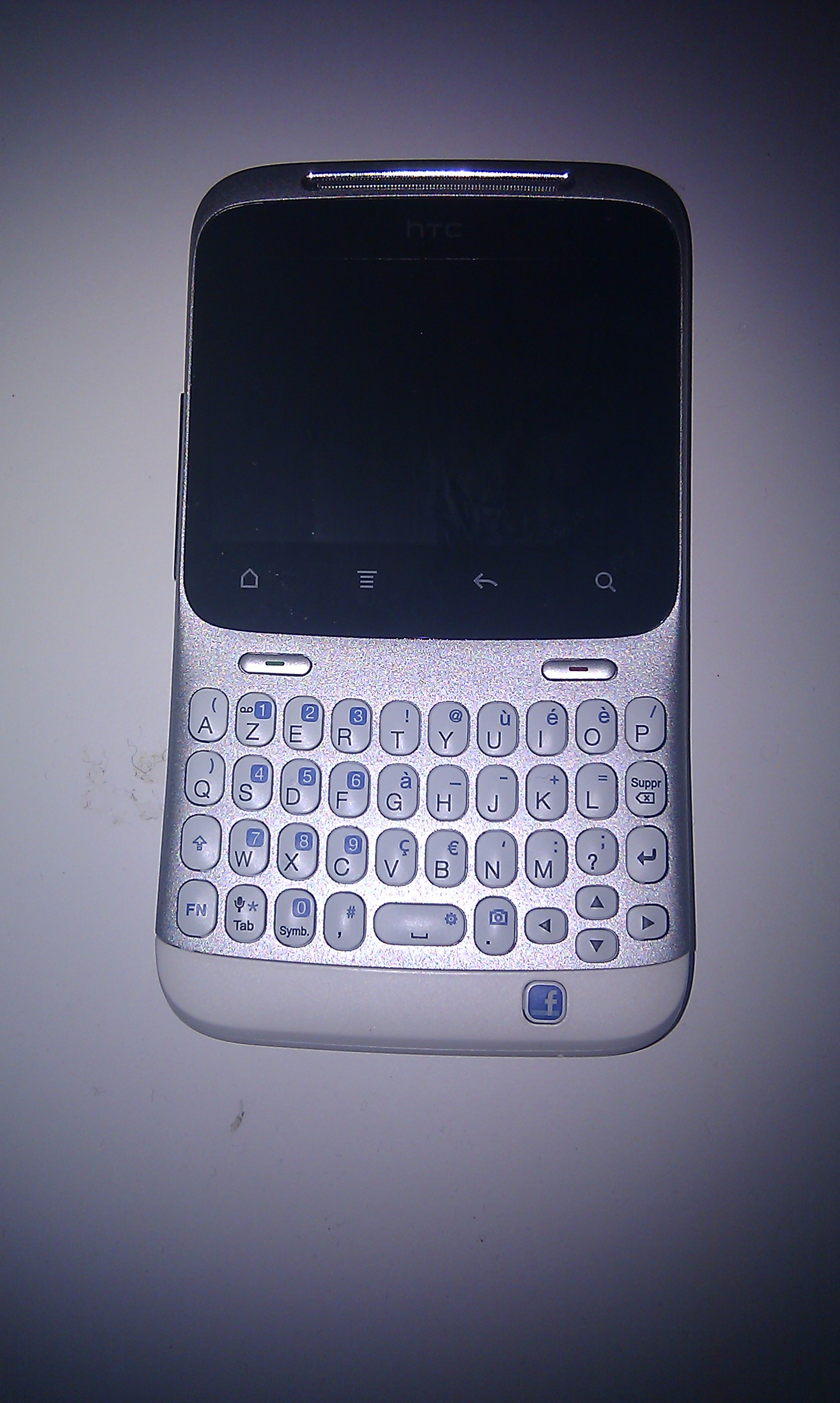
- HTC ChaCha with a physical French AZERTY keyboard
- Manufacturer: HTC
- First released: June 2011
- Successor: HTC First
- Related: HTC Salsa
- Compatible networks: AT&T
- Dimensions: 114.4×64.6×10.7 mm (4.50×2.54×0.42 in)
- Weight: 124 g (4.37 oz) with battery
- Operating system: Android 2.3 Gingerbread
- CPU: 800MHz Qualcomm Snapdragon MSM7227 processor (ARMv6)
- Memory: 512 MB of RAM
- Storage: microSD support
- Battery: Li-ion 1250 mAh
- Rear camera: 5-megapixel camera
- Display: 66 mm (2.6") Touchscreen 480x320 px
- Connectivity: HSDPA/HSUPA, Wi-Fi(IEEE 802.11b/g/n)
- Website: Official website

The HTC ChaCha (also known as the HTC ChaChaCha in Spanish-speaking countries or the HTC Status in the US and Canada) is an Android smartphone that was announced by HTC in February 2011 at the Mobile World Congress, alongside its sister phone, the HTC Salsa.

The ChaCha is primarily designed for text messaging, and also features tight integration with the social network Facebook, which includes a dedicated Facebook button below its keyboard which allows users to quickly share content on the service.

== Specification ==
- Processor = 800 MHz processor / MSM7227 (ARMv6)
- Memory = 512 MB ROM (onboard) + microSD slot (up to 32 GB) / 512 MB RAM
- Display = 46 mm (2.6") touch-screen
- Camera = 1 x 5 MP color with flash & 1 x VGA
- Connectivity = 900/2100 MHz on HSDPA/WCDMA, Quad-band GSM/GPRS/EDGE:850/900/1800/1900 MHz, Bluetooth, Wi-Fi (IEEE 802.11b/g/n), 3.5 mm stereo
- Software = Android 2.3.3 (Gingerbread). Android 2.3.5 was subsequently released as a download for this phone in December 2011.

Many custom ROMs now allow unofficial updates to the device, all the way up to Android 4.4.4 Kitkat, allowing users to overcome the limitations of low internal memory and RAM.

== Features ==
- Android OS, v2.3 (Gingerbread)
- Accelerometer, proximity, compass
- SMS(threaded view), MMS, Email, Push Email, IM
- HTML
- Radio Stereo FM radio with RDS
- Facebook dedicated key
- SNS integration
- Google Search, Maps, Gmail
- YouTube, Google Talk, Picasa integration
- MP3/AAC+/WAV/WMA player
- MP4/H.264 player
- Organizer
- Document viewer/editor
- Voice memo
- Predictive text input

== See also ==
- HTC First
