= HTC First =

Mid-range Android device produced by HTC, released April 2013

- Manufacturer: HTC
- Type: Smartphone
- First released: 12 April 2013
- Predecessor: HTC ChaCha/Status, HTC Salsa
- Related: HTC One mini
- Form factor: Slate
- Dimensions: 126 mm (5.0 in) H 65 mm (2.6 in) W 8.9 mm (0.35 in) D
- Weight: 123.9 g (4.37 oz)
- Operating system: Android 4.1.2
- System-on-chip: Qualcomm Snapdragon 400
- CPU: 1.4 GHz dual-core Krait
- GPU: Adreno 305
- Memory: 1 GB RAM
- Storage: 16 GB Internal ROM, non-expandable
- Battery: 2,000 mAh Li-Po
- Rear camera: 5 MP, 1080p@30fps video recording
- Front camera: 1.6 MP
- Display: 4.3 in (110 mm) diagonal, 1280 x 720 HD, 342 ppi
- Connectivity: 2G (GSM/GPRS/EDGE): 850/900/1,800/1,900 MHz; 3G (UMTS/HSPA/HSPA+): 850/900/1,900/2,100 MHz; LTE GPS; GLONASS; Micro USB 2.0; Bluetooth 4.0 with A2DP Wi-Fi 802.11 a/b/g/n
- Data inputs: Multi-touch, capacitive touchscreen, proximity sensor
- Website: HTC First

The HTC First is an Android smartphone released by HTC on April 12, 2013. It was unveiled on April 4, 2013, as part of a press event held by Facebook. Serving as a successor to a pair of Facebook-oriented devices HTC released in 2011, it was the first and only Android device to be pre-loaded with Facebook's own user interface layer, Facebook Home, in lieu of HTC's own Sense.

While considered compelling by critics for a mid-range phone due to its display quality and its optional use of stock Android beneath the default Facebook Home overlay, the HTC First was panned by critics for its poor camera and lack of removable storage, and was also affected by the similarly underwhelming reception faced by the Facebook Home software. AT&T, the exclusive U.S. carrier of the First, only reportedly sold over 15,000 units of the device, while both ReadWrite and Time named it among the biggest failures in the technology industry for 2013.

== Development ==
In 2011, HTC released two low-end smartphones that provided integration with the social networking service Facebook, the keyboard-equipped HTC Status, and the larger slate HTC Salsa. The two phones featured Facebook's apps pre-loaded, along with Facebook integration within the HTC Sense interface and a dedicated Facebook key that could be used to provide quick access to sharing functions. Facebook founder Mark Zuckerberg endorsed the two devices in a pre-taped statement during their unveiling, and promised the possibility of more "Facebook phones" in the near future. Later that year, details began surfacing about a collaboration between Facebook and HTC known as "Buffy" (after the television series Buffy the Vampire Slayer), a fork of Android that would be "deeply social".

The specifications of the phone was first leaked out by an HTC insider towards the end of 2012 that had claimed the device was then called "Opera UL" with a 1280x720 screen, and an Adreno 305 graphics processor with the Snapdragon 1.4 GHz CPU system on chip, which was later known to match the actual specifications of the final device.

In early 2013, reports indicated that HTC was preparing to unveil a Facebook-oriented smartphone with the revised codename "Myst"; this mid-range device was reportedly pre-loaded with a new Facebook-developed user interface layer known as "Facebook Home". Renderings of the new device leaked on April 3, 2013, revealing the design of the phone and its official name as the HTC First. Both Facebook Home and the HTC First were unveiled at a Facebook news conference held the following day on April 4, 2013. AT&T exclusively released the device in the United States on April 12, 2013.

== Specifications ==
=== Hardware ===
The HTC First is a mid-range smartphone which uses a dual-core, 1.4 GHz Qualcomm Snapdragon 400 processor with support for LTE, a 2000 mAh battery, 1 GB of RAM and 16 GB of non-expandable storage. The First uses a 4.3-inch 720p Super LCD, and includes a 5-megapixel rear-facing camera, and a 1.6-megapixel front-facing camera. The HTC First's exterior uses a rounded, minimal design with three capacitive buttons below its screen, and was available in black, light blue, red, and white color finishes.

=== Software ===
The HTC First runs Android 4.1.2 "Jelly Bean" and Facebook Home, a new interface layer developed by Facebook that heavily integrates with the service. Facebook Home consists of a home screen and lock screen replacement known as Cover Feed (which aggregates content posted by friends on Facebook along with notifications from other apps), the ability to message users (via either Facebook or SMS) from any app using the "Chat Heads" overlay, and an overall experience that is oriented towards social interaction. The HTC First was also the first smartphone to include the recently acquired Instagram as a pre-loaded app. Although support for Facebook Home is not limited to the HTC First (it was also released for select HTC and Samsung models as well, and the Chat Heads feature was added to the standalone Facebook Messenger app), integration with certain system functions (such as the ability to display non-Facebook notifications on the lock screen) is exclusive to the First due to technical limitations.

If Facebook Home is disabled, the device reverts to a stock Android 4.1 experience; the First was the first HTC device since the T-Mobile G2 to offer a stock Android interface and not ship with the company's HTC Sense software.

== Reception ==
The HTC First was released to mixed reviews. Dieter Bohn of The Verge gave the HTC First a 7.9 out of 10, receiving high marks in most categories except for its camera. Its design was considered to have a comfortable size and shape by contrast to larger flagship Android phones, and a display that was noted for its high resolution, good color reproduction and "ridiculous" viewing angles (but still being hard to use in direct sunlight). The First's camera was considered to be better than expected for a low-end phone, but produced "muddy" photos and "[felt] like a throwback to an earlier age when smartphones were nigh-useless in the dark." Facebook Home's functionality was considered to be good for casual users, but the ability to switch back to a stock Android 4.1 interface was considered "stunning" and a good compromise for the lack of Nexus devices with LTE support at the time.

Alex Roth of TechRadar gave the HTC First a 3.5 out of 5, praising its build quality and operating system (feeling that the First could "develop a sort of second life as the mid-range of choice among Google geeks" due to its use of stock Android and LTE support) and considering it to possibly be "the last decent dual-core handset ever made", but considered Facebook Home to be a "glorified screensaver", and also criticized the camera's low quality and the lack of a dedicated shutter button (which Roth believed would have made sense on a Facebook-oriented phone).

On May 13, 2013, reports surfaced that AT&T had only sold 15,000 units of the First since its launch, and was planning to discontinue the device in response to the poor reception of Facebook Home from both users and AT&T's sales representatives. The reports came shortly after AT&T had lowered the First's price from $99.99 to $0.99 on a two-year contract as a promotion; however, AT&T denied any possible connection to the device being possibly discontinued. In response to the issues, the release of the First on the British carriers EE and Orange was indefinitely delayed so Facebook could focus on making improvements to the Home software.

In December 2013, Time named the HTC First as one of the 47 "lamest moments in tech" for 2013, and ReadWrite similarly named it one of the "Top 10 Tech Failures" of 2013, stating that "like Carrie Underwood in the remade Sound of Music Live!, the HTC First smartphone started out as an intriguing concept that attempted to shoehorn something very popular (Facebook) into a familiar vehicle (a smartphone). And like that live television event, it wound up being an undeniable disaster."
