= Julie Zhuo =

Chinese-American businessperson and computer scientist

- Born: Shanghai, China
- Education: Stanford University
- Occupation: Co-Founder
- Employer: Sundial
- Known for: Product design
- Children: 3
- Website: juliezhuo.com

Julie Zhuo is a Chinese-American businesswoman and computer scientist. She was the vice president of product design at Facebook and now co-founder at Sundial. Zhuo is the author of The Making of a Manager (2019).

== Early life and education ==
Zhuo is from Shanghai. When she was five years old, her family moved to Texas. She studied computer science and graduated from Stanford University.

== Career ==
In May 2006, Zhuo became the first intern at Facebook, which was also her first job. She became a manager at the age of 25. Zhuo was the vice president of product and design.

She wrote the book The Making of a Manager: What to Do When Everyone Looks to You. The book was published in 2019.

== Personal life ==
Zhuo has three children. She and her husband live in California.
