= Facebook Dating =

Dating app

- Website type: Online dating service
- Available in: English
- Owner: Meta Platforms
- Website: facebook.com/dating
- Commercial: Yes
- Registration: Yes
- Launched: September 5, 2019; 7 years ago
- Current status: Active

Facebook Dating is an online dating service developed by Meta Platforms. There is currently no web version; it is only available from the Facebook mobile app on Android and iOS.

== Features ==
Users can filter results based on location, number of children, religion, age, or height, and can match with other users within a 100 km (62.14 mi) range. There is also an option to look for users that are in or out of range temporarily, as well as a Lucky Match filter that extends the user's regular limits to broaden the search. Users who have matched with each other can start a voice chat. Auto messages will be sent to matching users to help break the ice.

== Development ==
Facebook announced the product at their F8 developer conference in May 2018. The service was not fully announced at the conference, and attendees were told that more information would be coming soon. The feature was in internal beta testing within several months of the conference.

Facebook Dating launched in Colombia on September 20, 2018. Users contributed to establishing what the dating site would look like for future users, as it was still in the testing stages. Facebook stated that if the testing went well, it would become a more prominent part of the existing Facebook application.

The second expansion launched in Canada and Thailand in October 2018.

The feature is set to expand to fourteen new countries, including Bolivia, Brazil, Chile, Ecuador, Guyana, Laos, Malaysia, Paraguay, Peru, Philippines, Singapore, Suriname, Uruguay, and Vietnam. The service has been active for a year in Argentina, Canada, Colombia, Mexico, and Thailand. It allows users to connect with others all over the world and isn't confined to the specific region that they live in.

Facebook Dating was partially launched in the United States on September 5, 2019.

Facebook Dating was launched in Europe in October 2020, including Austria, Belgium, Bulgaria, Cyprus, Czechia, Denmark, Estonia, Finland, France, Germany, Greece, Croatia, Hungary, Ireland, Italy, Lithuania, Luxembourg, Latvia, Malta, Netherlands, Poland, Portugal, Romania, Sweden, Slovenia, Slovakia, Iceland, Liechtenstein, Norway, Spain, Switzerland, and the United Kingdom.

=== Age verification ===
In December 2022, Meta introduced age verification tools for Facebook Dating to ensure only users aged 18 and older can access the platform. Early results on Instagram showed 96% of teens who attempted to alter their age were stopped.
