= Facebook Slingshot =

Discontinued instant messaging software application

Facebook Slingshot was an instant messaging software application for sharing photos and videos with friends, designed by Facebook. The app was launched on June 18, 2014, for Android and iOS devices. The app was discontinued and removed from the app store and Google Play store in December 2015, after Facebook shut down its "Creative Labs" division.
