= Winklevoss =

Winklevoss may refer to:

- Howard Winklevoss (born 1943), American actuary, professor and author
- Cameron Winklevoss (born 1981), American investor, entrepreneur and rower, twin brother of Tyler Winklevoss
- Tyler Winklevoss (born 1981), American investor, entrepreneur and rower, twin brother of Cameron Winklevoss
  - Winklevoss Capital Management, cofounded and owned by the two brothers
