= SumZero =

Financial service company

SumZero, Inc.
- Company type: Private
- Industry: Financial Technology
- Founded: 2008
- Founders: Divya Narendra, Aalap Mahadevia
- Headquarters: Soho, New York City, NY, U.S.
- Products: SumZero Basic, SumZero Elite, SumZero Buyside, SumZero Cap Intro, SumZero Job Vault
- Website: SumZero.com

SumZero is an online community for professional investors (collectively referred to as the "buyside"), which hosts investment research, job opportunities, and capital introduction services. Buyside professionals are granted membership per an application, where they must be on the research team at a hedge fund, mutual fund, private equity fund, or investment banking proprietary trading desk. SumZero is a closed, application-based community, which currently has over 16,000 buyside members and over 60,000 'Basic' users. Roughly 75% of buyside applicants for membership are rejected. Members gain access to SumZero's Research platform and approximately 12,000 long-form theses on publicly traded securities. SumZero's ancillary products include Cap Intro and Job Vault.

== History ==
The site's co-founder and current CEO Divya Narendra came up with the idea for SumZero in April 2007, while working for the hedge fund Sowood Capital in Boston. Narendra and college friend Aalap Mahadevia subsequently launched SumZero in March 2008.

In June 2012, Winklevoss Capital made an angel investment of $1.05 million into SumZero.

In October 2012 the site announced its first Annual Investing Challenge, jointly organized by SumZero and the Value Investing Congress. The top three ideas were pitched on the CNBC television show Fast Money and winner Ryan Fusaro presented his investment idea at the Value Investing Congress on October 1, 2012, alongside the portfolio managers Bill Ackman, David Einhorn, and Barry Rosenstein.

SumZero hosted a co-branded research idea contest with Institutional Investor in November 2014. The event was hosted at the Bloomberg Tradebook headquarters in NYC. Over 250 SumZero members attended for live 4-minute presentations of stock pitches from 20 emerging managers, judged by a panel of professional investors.

In March 2017, SumZero announced the Van Biema Small-Cap Challenge in conjunction with van Biema Value Partners and the Royce Funds. The contest called for research ideas on international small- and micro-cap stocks from funds managing less than $50 million. Massif Capital, a NY-based long/short equity fund was selected as the final winner of the Challenge for founder Will Thomson's stock pitch on Lucara Diamond. The winner received allocations from the family offices of Chuck Royce and Michael Van Biema, as well as operational advice from Van Biema Value Partners.

The site opened applications for the Van Biema Small-Cap Ex-US Challenge in March 2018 and selected 5 finalists in May 2018.

== Products ==
SumZero's product suite consists of three sub-platforms: Research, Cap Intro, and Job Vault. The Research platform contains over 11,000 actionable recommendations on publicly traded securities. Approved ideas are about 2,000 words in length and include valuation, risks, and catalysts. The contributing analyst or the analyst's fund typically has a direct position in the idea.

The Cap Intro platform allows emerging fund managers to raise external capital by connecting them with a community of pre-vetted Allocators. The allocator pool includes single- and multi-family offices, endowment funds, and fund of funds. Cap Intro operates a reverse solicitation model in which allocators reach out directly to funds.

The Job Vault allows SumZero members to apply for buyside job opportunities submitted by firms on the site. All applicants must already be SumZero members and thus represent a pre-screened pool of candidates.

== 2012 study ==
A paper by Wesley Gray of Drexel University, Bryan Johnson of Creighton University, and Rice University’s Steven Crawford and Richard A. Price III, "Do Buy-Side Recommendations Have Investment Value?”, analyzes a subset of SumZero's Idea database, which is composed of 2,135 long and short calls on U.S. equity securities submitted to the website by 1,112 buyside analysts from 910 different funds.

This study shows that short recommendations from these analysts generate an immediate and significant decline in price, and long recommendations have positive short-term returns and exhibit a positive drift. The collective evidence presented in the paper suggests that buy-side recommendations have investment value. The paper also documents that broad institutional ownership decreases significantly for buy-side recommendations, but increases for the buy-side analysts’ employers, suggesting there is a wealth transfer between the broader institutional market and buy-side firms in the sample.
