= I2hub =

File-sharing software

- Company type: Private
- Headquarters: Massachusetts
- Area served: Worldwide
- Founder: Wayne Chang
- Industry: Internet, Computer software
- Products: i2hub.com, Jungalu.com, ConnectU.com, StallScribbles.com, Digital Flyers, ConnectHi (theyearbook.org), ConnectGroups, The Winklevoss Chang Group Representative Program, The Rep Center, Social Butterfly
- Website: i2hub.com
- Launched: March 2004
- Current status: Inactive

i2hub was a peer-to-peer file sharing service and program designed and intended primarily for use by university and college students.

== History ==
The program was created by Wayne Chang, a student at University of Massachusetts, Amherst.

i2hub used Internet2, which was a special network that connected universities around the world. It allowed faster data transfer rates than typical Internet connections. Because of this, download speeds through i2hub were usually much faster than through other peer-to-peer networks.

The service was launched in March 2004 and ultimately expanded to over 400 universities and colleges both in the United States and abroad.

== Competition from Facebook ==
In August 2004, Mark Zuckerberg, Andrew McCollum, Adam D'Angelo, and Sean Parker of Facebook launched a competing peer-to-peer file sharing service called Wirehog. Traction was low compared to i2hub, and Facebook ultimately shut it down.

== The Winklevoss Chang Group ==
As its user-base expanded, it attracted the attention of ConnectU. A partnership allegedly formed between i2hub and ConnectU. The partnership, called The Winklevoss Chang Group, jointly advertised their properties through bus advertisements as well as press releases. i2hub integrated its popular software with ConnectU's website, as part of the partnership. The team also jointly launched several projects and initiatives, including:

- Jungalu.com, an internet-based book exchange
- StallScribbles.com, an online "anonymous confessions" board
- Digital Flyers, a portal for purchasing advertisements to be placed on the various WCG websites and on i2hub
- ConnectHi (also known as ConnectHigh and theyearbook.org), an effort to penetrate the high school social networking market
- ConnectGroups, an initiative to provide clubs and organizations with a means for their members to communicate online with each other about their organizations
- The Winklevoss Chang Representative Program, a sales representative program which WCG used to establish a presence on college campuses and to promote ConnectU and the other WCG properties
- The Rep Center, an internet-based portal, accessible through ConnectU.com, providing a centralized location for the representatives of The Winklevoss Chang Representative Program to communicate and earn points (redeemable for prizes) by recruiting and signing up new users for all of WCG's properties
- Social Butterfly, a feature added to ConnectU to enable users to consolidate their accounts at various social networking sites, such as Facebook, and make that information accessible through ConnectU
- US Patent Application 20060212395, related to a method of purchasing of copyrighted computer files through affinity programs, such as using points from a credit card to purchase copyrighted movies.

== Legal pressure ==
The network was criticized by the Recording Industry Association of America (RIAA) for its ability to share copyrighted materials through a faster medium. On October 5, 2004, Cary Sherman, the president of the RIAA, talked about i2hub in a statement to the United States House of Representatives. On April 12, 2005, the RIAA announced it was suing 405 i2hub users, students at 18 colleges and universities, for copyright infringement. On September 22, 2005, the United States House of Representatives had another hearing to discuss i2hub. On November 14, 2005, i2hub was shut down with the message "RIP 11/14/2005. It was a good run. Forced to shut down by the industry."

On January 17, 2006, The Wall Street Journal wrote that UMASS students that were sued for using i2hub wanted founder Wayne Chang to pay for their lawsuits. Wayne Chang and his attorney, Charles Baker, who also represented StreamCast Networks (makers of the Morpheus P2P software), responded saying that i2hub has no liability in the matter and is protected by the EULA. The lawsuit was never filed by the UMASS students.

== Facebook lawsuits ==
ConnectU had sued Facebook in early 2004. Facebook countersued in regard to the team's Social Butterfly project, and named among the defendants ConnectU, Cameron Winklevoss, Tyler Winklevoss, Divya Narendra, and Wayne Chang. Settlement was reached where Facebook acquired ConnectU for 1,253,326 shares of Facebook stock and an additional $20 million in cash. On August 26, 2010, The New York Times reported that Facebook shares were trading at $76 per share in the secondary market, putting the total settlement value at close to $120 million. Another lawsuit was filed to undo the settlement, as Facebook allegedly misrepresented the value of the stock by more than fourfold. If the settlement were adjusted to match, the total value would be over $466 million.

== The Winklevoss Chang Group lawsuit ==
On December 21, 2009, i2hub founder Wayne Chang and The i2hub Organization launched a lawsuit against ConnectU and its founders, Cameron Winklevoss, Tyler Winklevoss, and Divya Narendra, seeking 50% of the settlement. The complaint claimed, that "The Winklevosses and Howard Winklevoss filed [a] patent application, U.S. Patent Application No 20060212395, on or around March 15, 2005, but did not list Chang as a co-inventor." It also stated "Through this litigation, Chang asserts his ownership interest in The Winklevoss Chang Group and ConnectU, including the settlement proceeds." Lee Gesmer (of prominent law firm Gesmer Updegrove, LLP) posted the detailed 33-page complaint online.

On May 13, 2011, Judge Peter Lauriat made a ruling against the Winklevosses. Chang's case against them could proceed. The Winklevosses had argued that the court lacked jurisdiction because the settlement with Facebook had not been distributed and therefore Chang had not suffered any injury. Judge Lauriat wrote, "The flaw in this argument is that defendants appear to conflate loss of the settlement proceed with loss of rights. Chang alleges that he has received nothing in return for the substantial benefits he provided to ConnectU, including the value of his work, as well as i2hub's users and goodwill." Lauriat also wrote that, although Chang's claims to the settlement are "too speculative to confer standing, his claims with respect to an ownership in ConnectU are not. They constitute an injury separate and distinct from his possible share of the settlement proceeds. The court concluded that Chang had pled sufficient facts to confer standing with respect to his claims against the Winklevoss defendants."
