= Mark Zuckerberg =

American businessman and programmer (born 1984)

- Zuckerberg in 2026
- Born: Mark Elliot Zuckerberg; May 14, 1984 (age 42); White Plains, New York, U.S.
- Education: Harvard University (dropped out)
- Occupations: Businessman; programmer; webmaster
- Years active: 2004–present
- Title: Co-founder, chairman and CEO of Meta Platforms and Facebook; Co-founder and co-CEO of Chan Zuckerberg Initiative
- Spouse: Priscilla Chan (m. 2012)
- Children: 3
- Relatives: Randi Zuckerberg (sister); Donna Zuckerberg (sister)
- Website: facebook.com/zuck

Mark Elliot Zuckerberg (/ˈzʌkərbɜːrɡ/; born May 14, 1984) is an American businessman, webmaster, and programmer who co-founded the social media service Facebook and its parent company Meta Platforms. He is its chairman, chief executive officer (CEO), and controlling shareholder.

Zuckerberg briefly attended Harvard College, and launched Facebook there in February 2004 with his roommates Eduardo Saverin, Andrew McCollum, Dustin Moskovitz and Chris Hughes. Zuckerberg took the company public in May 2012 with majority shares. He became the world's youngest self-made billionaire (Note: Kylie Jenner was thought to be the youngest until it was reported that she had allegedly forged documents to make her appear to be a billionaire.) (Note: In October 2025, according to Forbes, Mercor co-founders Adarsh Hiremath, Brendan Foody and Surya Midha became the world's youngest self-made billionaries at age 22 each.) in 2008 at age 23 and has consistently ranked among the world's wealthiest people. According to Forbes, Zuckerberg's estimated net worth stood at US$258 billion as of September 2026.

He has used his funds to organize multiple large donations, including the establishment of the Chan Zuckerberg Initiative. A film based on Zuckerberg's early career, legal troubles and initial success with Facebook, The Social Network, was released in 2010. His prominence and fast rise in the technology industry has prompted political and legal attention. He has been the subject of multiple lawsuits regarding the creation and ownership of the website as well as issues such as user privacy.

== Early life ==
Mark Elliot Zuckerberg was born on May 14, 1984, in White Plains, New York, to Jewish parents Dr. Edward Zuckerberg, a dentist, and Karen (née Kempner), a psychiatrist. He and his three sisters (Arielle, Randi, and Donna) were raised in a Reform Jewish household in Dobbs Ferry, New York. Their great-grandparents were emigrants from Austria, Germany, and Poland. Zuckerberg initially attended Ardsley High School before transferring to Phillips Exeter Academy. According to his Harvard application, he was captain of the fencing team.

=== Software development ===
==== Early years ====
Zuckerberg learned computer programming in his childhood. At about the age of eleven, he created "ZuckNet", a program that allowed computers at the family home and his father's dental office to communicate with each other. During Zuckerberg's high-school years, he worked to build a music player called the Synapse Media Player. The device used machine learning to learn the user's listening habits, which was posted to Slashdot and received a rating of 3 out of 5 from PC Magazine. The New Yorker once said of Zuckerberg, "some kids played computer games. Mark created them." While still in high school, he attended Mercy College taking a graduate computer course on Thursday evenings.

==== College years ====
The New Yorker noted that by the time Zuckerberg began classes at Harvard in 2002, he had already achieved a "reputation as a programming prodigy". He studied psychology and computer science, resided in Kirkland House, and belonged to Alpha Epsilon Pi. In his second year, he wrote a program that he called CourseMatch, which allowed users to make class selection decisions based on the choices of other students and help them form study groups. Later, he created a different program he initially called Facemash that let students select the best-looking person from a choice of photos. Arie Hasit, Zuckerberg's roommate at the time, explained:

We had books called "Face Books", which included the names and pictures of everyone who lived in the student dorms. At first, he built a site and placed two pictures, or pictures of two males and two females. Visitors to the site had to choose who was "hotter" and according to the votes there would be a ranking.

The site went up over a weekend, but by Monday morning, the college shut it down, because its popularity had overwhelmed one of Harvard's network switches, preventing students from accessing the Internet. In addition, many students complained that their photos were being used without permission. Zuckerberg apologized publicly, and the student paper ran articles stating that his site was "completely improper".

== Career ==
=== Facebook ===
In January 2004, Zuckerberg began writing code for a new website. On February 4, 2004, Zuckerberg launched "Thefacebook", originally located at thefacebook.com, in partnership with his roommates Eduardo Saverin, Andrew McCollum, Dustin Moskovitz, and Chris Hughes. An earlier inspiration for Facebook may have come from Phillips Exeter Academy, the prep school from which Zuckerberg graduated in 2002. It published its own student directory, "The Photo Address Book", which students referred to as "The Facebook". Such photo directories were an important part of the student social experience at many private schools. With them, students were able to list attributes such as their class years, their friends, and their telephone numbers.

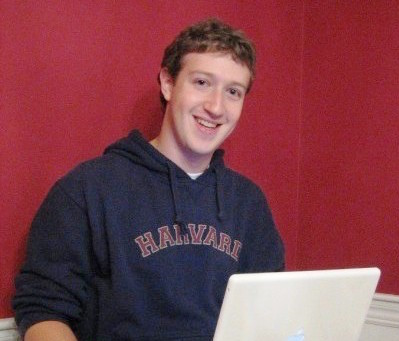
Zuckerberg in 2005

Six days after the site launched, three Harvard seniors, Cameron Winklevoss, Tyler Winklevoss, and Divya Narendra, accused Zuckerberg of intentionally misleading them into believing that he would help them build a social network called HarvardConnection.com, when he was using their ideas to build a competing product. The three complained to The Harvard Crimson, and the newspaper began an investigation in response. While Zuckerberg tried to convince the editors not to run the story, he also broke into two of the editors' email accounts by using their private login data logs from TheFacebook.

Following the official launch of the Facebook social media platform, the three filed a lawsuit against Zuckerberg that resulted in a settlement. The agreed settlement was for 1.2 million Facebook shares and $20 million in cash (equivalent to $28,047,543 in 2025).

Zuckerberg's Facebook started off as just a "Harvard thing" until he decided to spread it to other schools, enlisting the help of roommate and co-founder Dustin Moskovitz. They began with Columbia University, New York University, Stanford University, Dartmouth College, Cornell University, University of Pennsylvania, Brown University, and Yale University.

Zuckerberg dropped out of Harvard in his second year in order to complete the project. Zuckerberg, Moskovitz and the other co-founders moved to Palo Alto, California, where they leased a small house that served as an office. Over the summer, Zuckerberg met Peter Thiel, who invested in his company. They got their first office in mid-2004. According to Zuckerberg, the group planned to return to Harvard, but eventually decided to remain in California, where Zuckerberg appreciated the "mythical place" of Silicon Valley, the center of computer technology in California. They had already turned down offers by major corporations to buy the company. The same year, speaking at Y Combinator's Startup School course at Stanford University, Zuckerberg made a controversial assertion that "young people are just smarter" and that other entrepreneurs should bias towards hiring young people.

Earlier, in April 2009, Zuckerberg had sought the advice of former Netscape CFO Peter Currie regarding financing strategies for Facebook. On July 21, 2010, Zuckerberg reported that Facebook had reached the 500-million-user mark.

In 2010, Steven Levy, who wrote the 1984 book Hackers: Heroes of the Computer Revolution, wrote that Zuckerberg "clearly thinks of himself as a hacker". Zuckerberg said that "it's OK to break things" "to make them better". Facebook instituted "hackathons" held every six to eight weeks where participants would have one night to conceive of and complete a project. The company provided music, food, and beer at the hackathons, and many Facebook staff members, including Zuckerberg, regularly attended. "The idea is that you can build something really good in a night", Zuckerberg told Levy. "And that's part of the personality of Facebook now ... It's definitely very core to my personality."

In 2007, Zuckerberg was added to MIT Technology Review's TR35 list as one of the top 35 innovators in the world under the age of 35. Vanity Fair magazine named Zuckerberg number 1 on its 2010 list of the Top 100 "most influential people of the Information Age". Zuckerberg ranked number 23 on the Vanity Fair 100 list in 2009. In 2010, Zuckerberg was chosen as number 16 in New Statesman's annual survey of the world's 50 most influential figures.

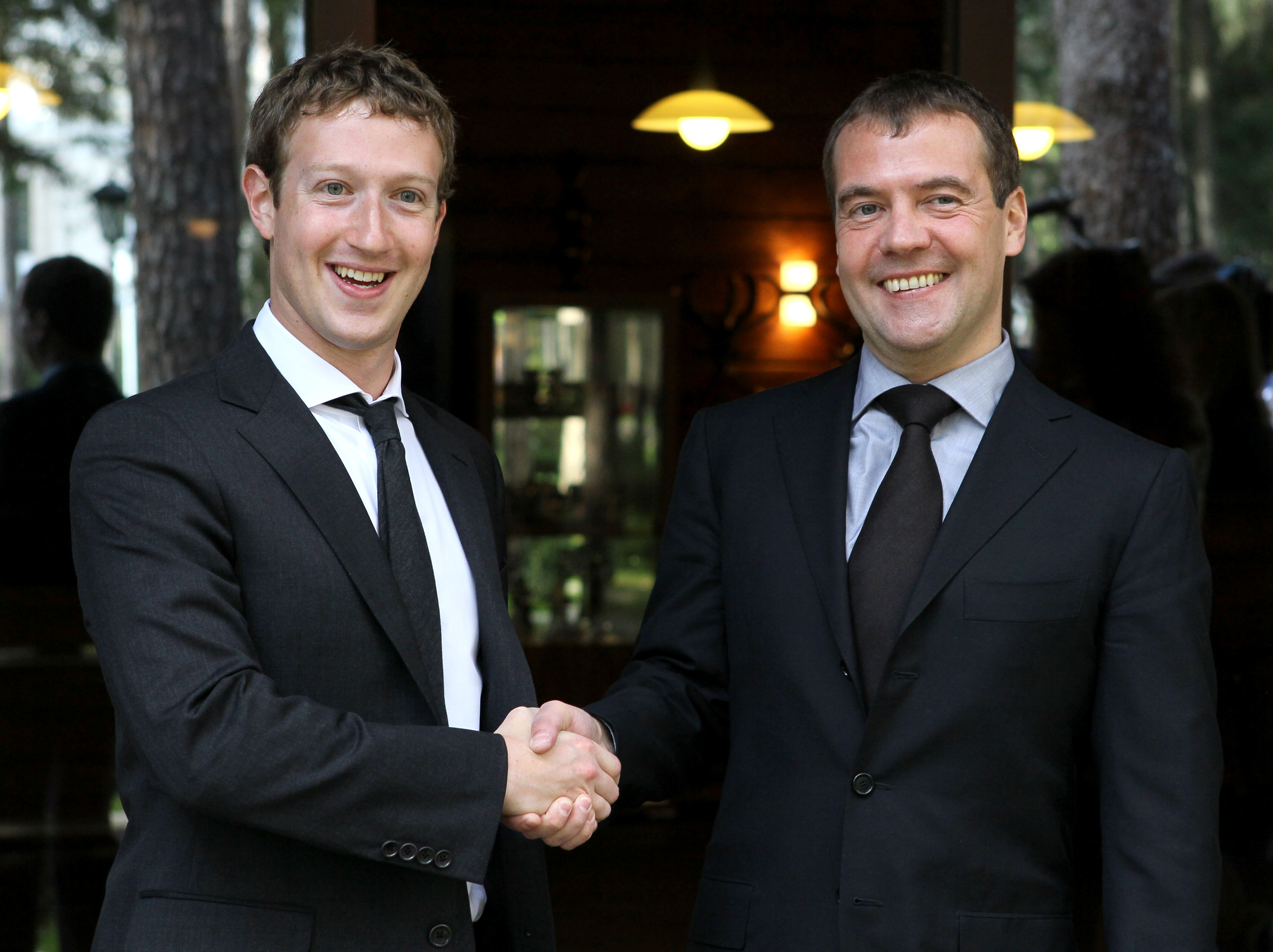
Zuckerberg and Russian Prime Minister Dmitry Medvedev during their meeting at the Russian leader's residence outside Moscow, October 1, 2012

On October 1, 2012, Zuckerberg met with then-Russian Prime Minister Dmitry Medvedev in Moscow to stimulate social media innovation in Russia and to boost Facebook's position in the Russian market. Russia's communications minister tweeted that Medvedev persuaded Zuckerberg to open a research center in Moscow instead of trying to lure away Russian programmers. In 2012, Facebook had roughly 9 million users in Russia, while domestic clone VK had around 34 million.

On August 19, 2013, The Washington Post reported that Zuckerberg's Facebook profile was hacked by an unemployed web developer.

At the 2013 TechCrunch Disrupt conference, held in September, Zuckerberg stated that he was working towards registering the 5 billion people who were not connected to the Internet as of the conference on Facebook. Zuckerberg then explained that this was intertwined with the aim of the Internet.org project, whereby Facebook, with the support of other technology companies, sought to increase the number of people connected to the internet.

Zuckerberg was the keynote speaker at the 2014 Mobile World Congress (MWC), held in Barcelona, Spain, in March 2014, which was attended by 75,000 delegates. Various media sources highlighted the connection between Facebook's focus on mobile technology and Zuckerberg's speech, stating that mobile represented the future of the company.

Alongside other American technology figures such as Jeff Bezos and Tim Cook, Zuckerberg hosted visiting Chinese politician Lu Wei, known as the "Internet czar" for his influence in the enforcement of China's online policy, at Facebook's headquarters on December 8, 2014. The meeting occurred after Zuckerberg participated in a Q&A session at Tsinghua University in Beijing, China, on October 23, 2014, where he conversed in Mandarin Chinese.

On January 1, 2013, a one-dollar salary was put into effect for Zuckerberg. In June 2016, Business Insider named Zuckerberg one of the "Top 10 Business Visionaries Creating Value for the World" along with Elon Musk and Sal Khan, due to the fact that he and his wife "pledged to give away 99% of their wealth-then estimated at $55.0 billion" (equivalent to $72.2 billion in 2025).

On May 25, 2017, at Harvard's 366th commencement day, Zuckerberg, after giving a commencement speech, received an honorary degree from Harvard.

In January 2019, Zuckerberg laid plans to integrate an end-to-end encrypted system for three major social media platforms, including Facebook, Instagram and WhatsApp. On August 14, 2020, Facebook integrated the chat systems for Instagram and Messenger on both iOS and Android devices. The update encouraged cross-communication between Instagram and Facebook users.

=== Other roles and projects ===
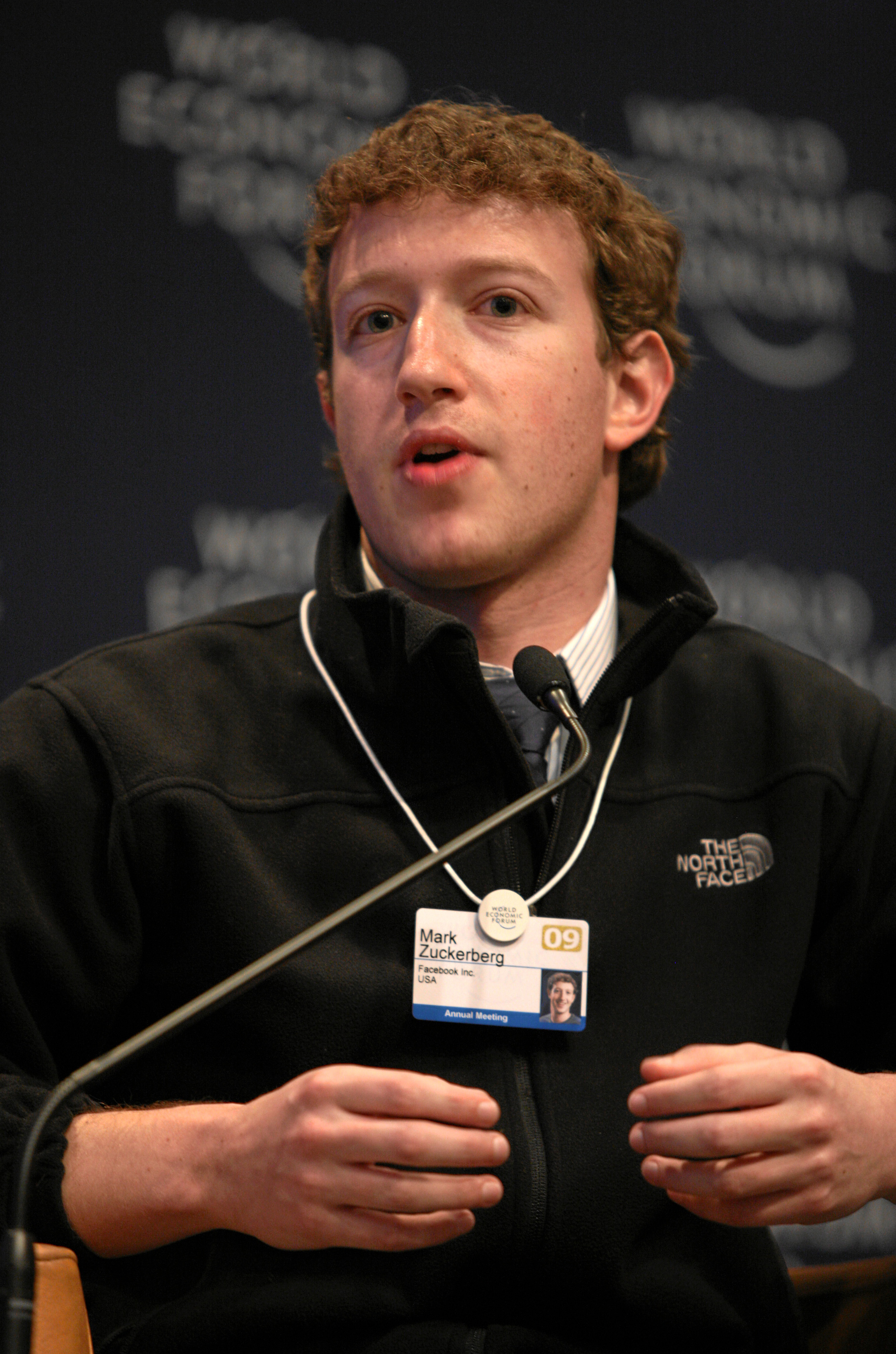
Zuckerberg at the World Economic Forum in Davos, Switzerland (January 2009)

A month after Zuckerberg launched Facebook in February 2004, i2hub, another campus-only service, created by Wayne Chang and focusing on peer-to-peer file sharing, was launched. At the time, both i2hub and Facebook were gaining the attention of the press and growing rapidly in users and publicity. In August 2004, Zuckerberg, Andrew McCollum, Adam D'Angelo, and Sean Parker launched a competing peer-to-peer file sharing service called Wirehog, a precursor to Facebook Platform applications, which was launched in 2007.

In 2013, Zuckerberg launched Internet.org, which he described as an initiative to provide Internet access to the five billion people without it as of the launch date. The project faced significant opposition in India, where activists said its limited internet ran counter to the principle of net neutrality; Zuckerberg responded by saying that a limited internet was better than no internet. Internet.org was shut down in India in February 2016.

Zuckerberg is a board member of the solar sail spacecraft development project Breakthrough Starshot, which he co-founded with Yuri Milner and Stephen Hawking in 2016.

In 2026, Zuckerberg was appointed to the President's Council of Advisors on Science and Technology (PCAST) by President Donald Trump.

== Lawsuits ==
=== ConnectU lawsuits ===
Harvard students Cameron Winklevoss, Tyler Winklevoss, and Divya Narendra accused Zuckerberg of intentionally making them believe he would help them build a social network called HarvardConnection.com (later called ConnectU). They filed a lawsuit in 2004; it was dismissed on a technicality on March 28, 2007. It was refiled soon thereafter in a federal court in Boston. Facebook countersued in regards to Social Butterfly, a project put out by The Winklevoss Chang Group, an alleged partnership between ConnectU and i2hub. On June 25, 2008, the case settled and Facebook agreed to transfer over 1.2 million common shares and pay $20 million in cash (equivalent to $30,013,960 in 2025).

In November 2007, court documents were posted on the website of 02138, a magazine that catered to Harvard alumni. They included Zuckerberg's Social Security number, his parents' home address, and his girlfriend's address. Although Facebook filed to have the documents removed, the judge ruled in favor of 02138.

=== Eduardo Saverin ===
In 2005, Facebook co-founder Eduardo Saverin filed a lawsuit against Zuckerberg and Facebook, alleging that Zuckerberg had illegally spent Saverin's money on personal expenses. The lawsuit was settled out of court and, although terms of the settlement were sealed, the company affirmed Saverin's title as co-founder of Facebook, and Saverin agreed to stop talking to the press.

=== Pakistan criminal investigation ===
In June 2010, then-Pakistani Deputy Attorney General Muhammad Azhar Sidiqque launched a criminal investigation into Zuckerberg and Facebook co-founders Dustin Moskovitz and Chris Hughes after a "Draw Muhammad" contest was hosted on Facebook. The investigation also named the anonymous German woman who created the contest. Sidiqque asked the country's police to contact Interpol to have Zuckerberg and the three others arrested for blasphemy. On May 19, 2010, Facebook's website was temporarily blocked in Pakistan until Facebook removed the contest from its website at the end of May. Sidiqque also asked its UN representative to raise the issue with the United Nations General Assembly.

=== Paul Ceglia ===
In June 2010, Paul Ceglia, the owner of a wood pellet fuel company in Allegany County, upstate New York, filed a suit against Zuckerberg, claiming 84 percent ownership of Facebook and seeking monetary damages. According to Ceglia, he and Zuckerberg signed a contract on April 28, 2003, that an initial fee of $1,000 (equivalent to $1,750 in 2025) entitled Ceglia to 50% of the website's revenue, as well as an additional 1% interest in the business per day after January 1, 2004, until website completion. Zuckerberg was developing other projects at the time, among which was Facemash, the predecessor to Facebook, but did not register the domain name thefacebook.com until January 1, 2004. The Facebook management dismissed the lawsuit as "completely frivolous". Facebook spokesman Barry Schnitt told a reporter that Ceglia's counsel had unsuccessfully sought an out-of-court settlement.

On October 26, 2012, federal authorities arrested Ceglia, charging him with mail and wire fraud and of "tampering with, destroying and fabricating evidence in a scheme to defraud the Facebook founder of billions of dollars". Ceglia is accused of fabricating emails to make it appear that he and Zuckerberg discussed details about an early version of Facebook, although after examining their emails, investigators found there was no mention of Facebook in them. Some law firms withdrew from the case before it was initiated and others after Ceglia's arrest.

=== Hawaiian land ownership ===
In 2014, Zuckerberg purchased 700 acres of land on the Hawaiian island of Kauaʻi. In January 2017, Zuckerberg filed eight "quiet title and partition" lawsuits against hundreds of native Hawaiians to claim small tracts of land that they owned within his acreage. Zuckerberg responded to criticisms in a Facebook post, stating that the lawsuits were a good faith effort to pay the partial owners of the land their "fair share". When he learned that Hawaiian land ownership law differs from that of the other 49 states, he dropped the lawsuits. Zuckerberg stated that he regretted not taking the time to understand the process and its history before moving ahead. Eventually, an auction helped sell the pockets of land.

Zuckerberg paid $17 million (equivalent to $20,198,330 in 2025) to add 110 acres to his contentious 1,500-acre estate in Kauai, in December 2021.

At least $145 million was spent by Zuckerberg on land in Kauai that he is developing into a massive 1,450-acre retreat that is partially gated off. In a January Instagram post, he uploaded a picture of a massive steak and joked that "of all my projects, this is the most delicious," indicating that he is rearing beer-fed Wagyu and Angus cattle on the property, involving his daughters in the process.

=== Testimonies before U.S. Congress ===
On April 10 and 11, 2018, Zuckerberg testified before the United States Senate Committee on Commerce, Science, and Transportation regarding the usage of personal data by Facebook in relation to the Facebook–Cambridge Analytica data scandal. He called the whole affair a breach of trust between Aleksandr Kogan, Cambridge Analytica, and Facebook. Zuckerberg refused requests to appear to give evidence on the matter to a Parliamentary committee in the United Kingdom.

On October 1, 2020, the US Senate Commerce Committee unanimously voted to issue subpoenas to the CEOs of three top tech firms, including Zuckerberg, Google's Sundar Pichai and Twitter's Jack Dorsey. The subpoenas aimed to force the CEOs to testify about the legal immunity the law affords tech platforms under Section 230 of the Communications Act of 1934. US Republicans argued that the law unduly protected social media companies against allegations of anti-conservative censorship.

On March 25, 2021, Zuckerberg testified before the House Energy and Commerce Committee regarding Facebook's role in the spread of misinformation and hate speech on the platform. During the hearing, he was questioned about Facebook's handling of user data, its role in the January 6, 2021, attack on the US Capitol Building, and its efforts to combat misinformation and hate speech. Zuckerberg acknowledged that Facebook had a responsibility to address these issues and outlined the steps that the company is taking to improve its policies and practices. The hearing was part of a broader effort by Congress to hold tech companies accountable for their role in shaping public discourse and protecting user privacy.

In a January 2024 Senate Judiciary Committee hearing on child safety and social media platforms, Zuckerberg, along with other tech CEOs, were questioned about their companies' practices. During the hearing, he stood up, turned toward the audience, and apologized to the families of children who were victims of online abuse and harm.

=== Opposition to Meta proposals for teenagers' mental health ===
Court documents allege that Zuckerberg personally rejected Meta's proposals to improve teenagers' mental health. He consistently opposed efforts to enhance well-being on Facebook and Instagram, overriding senior executives such as Instagram head Adam Mosseri and Global Affairs President Nick Clegg, as revealed in an ongoing lawsuit. Internal communications disclosed in the Massachusetts-initiated legal action depict Zuckerberg's resistance to better protect over 30 million teens on Instagram in the U.S., highlighting his substantial influence on Meta's decisions impacting billions of users. These documents also shed light on occasional tensions between Zuckerberg and other Meta officials advocating for improved user well-being.

=== New Mexico lawsuit on Meta's lack of restriction on AI bots ===
The lawsuit alleges that Meta "failed to stem the tide of damaging sexual material and sexual propositions delivered to children" on Facebook and Instagram. Evidence showed that Mark Zuckerberg approved allowing minors to access AI chatbot companions that safety staffers warned were capable of sexual interactions.

== Depictions in media ==
=== The Social Network ===
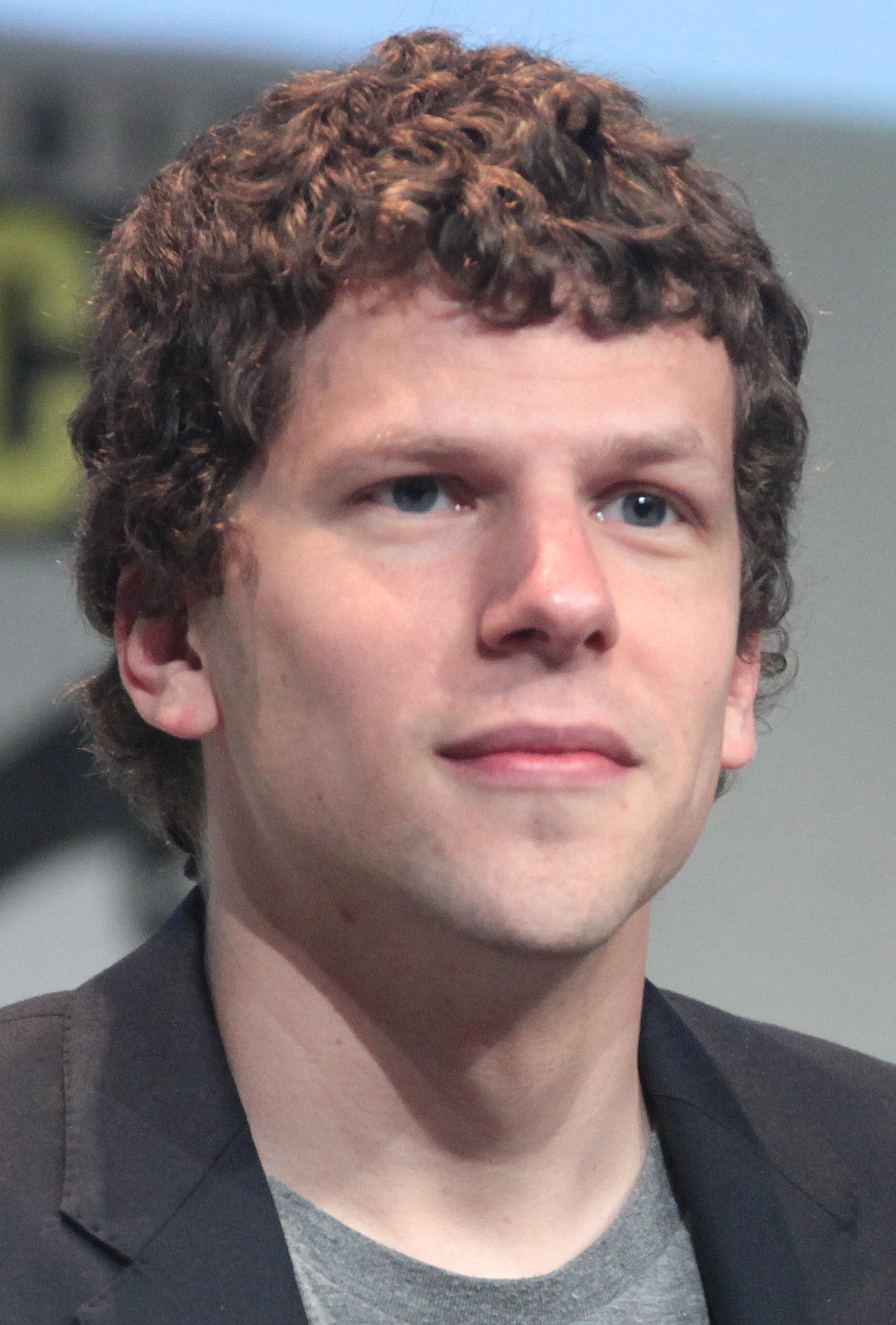
Jesse Eisenberg (pictured) played Zuckerberg in The Social Network.

A movie based on Zuckerberg and the founding years of Facebook, The Social Network, was released on October 1, 2010, starring Jesse Eisenberg as Zuckerberg. After Zuckerberg was told about the film, he responded, "I just wished that nobody made a movie of me while I was still alive." Also, after the film's script was leaked on the Internet and it was apparent that the film would not portray Zuckerberg in a wholly positive light, he stated that he wanted to establish himself as a "good guy". The film is based on the book The Accidental Billionaires by Ben Mezrich, which the book's publicist once described as "big juicy fun" rather than "reportage". The film's screenwriter Aaron Sorkin told New York magazine, "I don't want my fidelity to be the truth; I want it to be storytelling", adding, "What is the big deal about accuracy purely for accuracy's sake, and can we not have the true be the enemy of the good?".

Upon winning the Golden Globe Award for Best Picture on January 16, 2011, producer Scott Rudin thanked Facebook and Zuckerberg "for his willingness to allow us to use his life and work as a metaphor through which to tell a story about communication and the way we relate to each other". Sorkin, who won for Best Screenplay, retracted some of the impressions given in his script:

I wanted to say to Mark Zuckerberg tonight, if you're watching, Rooney Mara's character makes a prediction at the beginning of the movie. She was wrong. You turned out to be a great entrepreneur, a visionary, and an incredible altruist.

In January 2011, Zuckerberg made a surprise guest appearance on Saturday Night Live, which was hosted by Jesse Eisenberg. They both said it was the first time they had met. Eisenberg asked Zuckerberg, who had been critical of his portrayal by the film, what he thought of the movie. Zuckerberg replied, "It was interesting." In a subsequent interview about their meeting, Eisenberg explained that he was "nervous to meet him, because I had spent now, a year and a half thinking about him ...". He added, "Mark has been so gracious about something that's really so uncomfortable ... The fact that he would do SNL and make fun of the situation is so sweet and so generous. It's the best possible way to handle something that, I think, could otherwise be very uncomfortable."

Jeremy Strong portrayed Zuckerberg in the 2026 sequel, The Social Reckoning.

==== Disputed accuracy ====
According to David Kirkpatrick, former technology editor at Fortune magazine and author of The Facebook Effect: The Inside Story of the Company That Is Connecting the World (2011), "the film is only 40% true ... he is not snide and sarcastic in a cruel way, the way Zuckerberg is played in the movie." He says that "a lot of the factual incidents are accurate, but many are distorted, and the overall impression is false" and concludes that primarily "his motivations were to try and come up with a new way to share information on the Internet".

Although the film portrayed Zuckerberg's creation of Facebook in order to elevate his stature after not getting into any of the elite final clubs at Harvard, Zuckerberg stated that he had no interest in joining the clubs. Kirkpatrick agreed that the impression implied by the film is "false". Karel Baloun, a former senior engineer at Facebook, noted that the "image of Zuckerberg as a socially inept nerd is overstated ... It is fiction ...". He likewise dismissed the film's assertion that he "would deliberately betray a friend".

=== Other depictions ===
Zuckerberg voiced himself on an episode of The Simpsons titled "Loan-a Lisa", which first aired on October 3, 2010. In the episode, Lisa Simpson and her friend Nelson encounter Zuckerberg at an entrepreneurs' convention. Zuckerberg tells Lisa that she does not need to graduate from college to be wildly successful, referencing Bill Gates and Richard Branson as examples. On October 9, 2010, Saturday Night Live lampooned Zuckerberg and Facebook. Andy Samberg portrayed the role of Zuckerberg. Zuckerberg himself was reportedly amused by the sketch.

Stephen Colbert awarded a "Medal of Fear" to Zuckerberg at the Rally to Restore Sanity and/or Fear on October 30, 2010, "because he values his privacy much more than he values yours". Zuckerberg appeared in the climax of 2013 documentary film Terms and Conditions May Apply. The South Park episode "Franchise Prequel" mocked him. According to CNET, he was portrayed as "a rosy-cheeked bully nerd who utters strange noises, makes peculiar kung fu gestures and turns up wherever he likes in people's houses".

== Donations and Chan Zuckerberg Initiative ==
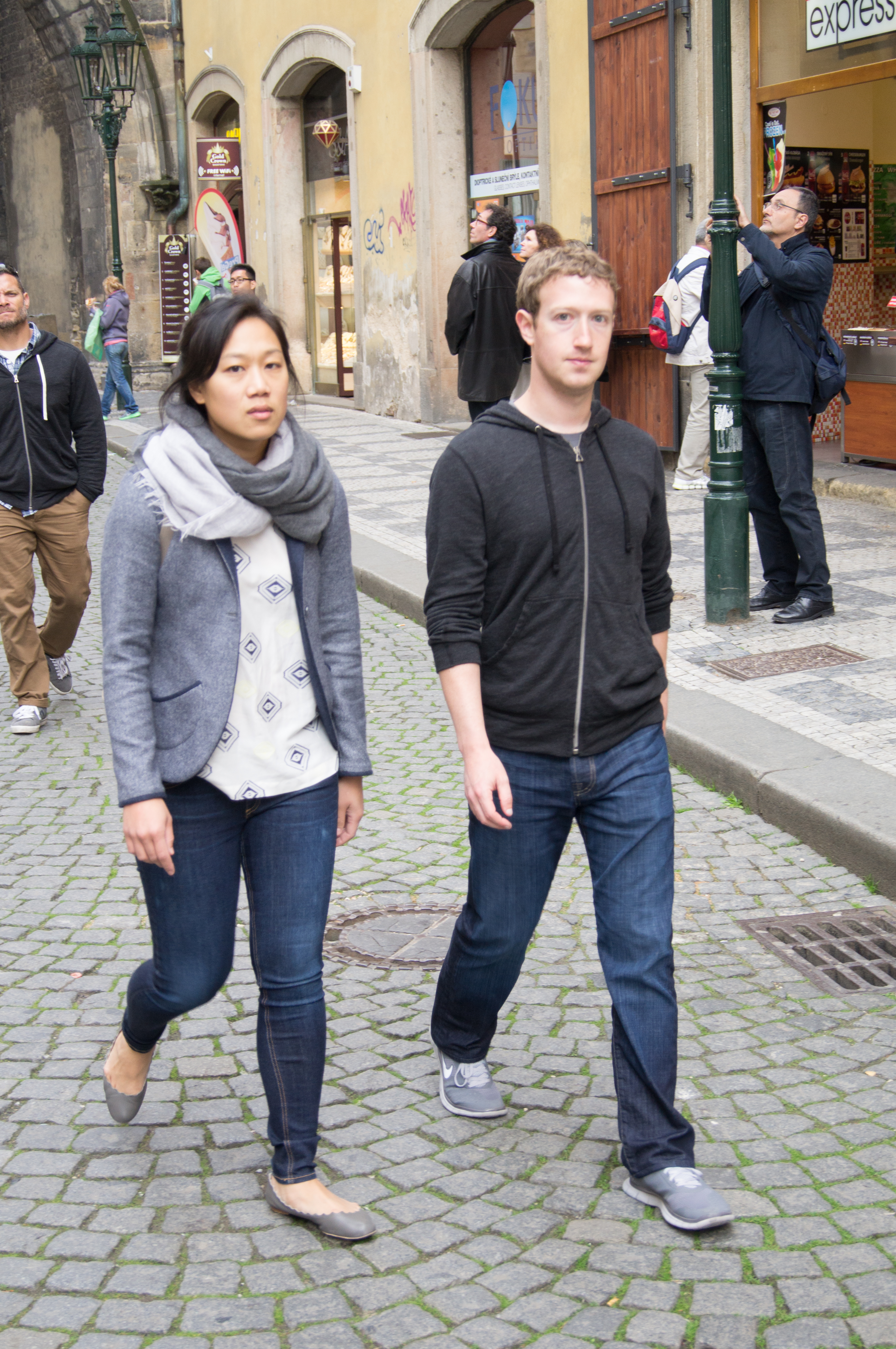
Zuckerberg and his wife Priscilla Chan in May 2013

Zuckerberg founded the Startup:Education foundation. It was reported in September 2010 that he had donated $100 million (equivalent to $147,642,301 in 2025) to Newark Public Schools, the public school system of Newark, New Jersey. Critics noted the timing of the donation as being close to the release of The Social Network, which painted a somewhat negative portrait of Zuckerberg. Zuckerberg responded to the criticism, saying, "The thing that I was most sensitive about with the movie timing was, I didn't want the press about The Social Network movie to get conflated with the Newark project. I was thinking about doing this anonymously just so that the two things could be kept separate." Newark Mayor Cory Booker stated that he and New Jersey Governor Chris Christie had to convince Zuckerberg's team not to make the donation anonymously. The money was largely wasted, according to journalist Dale Russakoff.

In 2010, Zuckerberg, Bill Gates, and investor Warren Buffett signed The Giving Pledge, in which they said they would donate to charity at least half of their wealth over the course of time, and invited others among the wealthy to donate 50 percent or more of their wealth to charity. In December 2012, Zuckerberg and his wife Priscilla Chan said that over the course of their lives they would give the majority of their wealth to "advancing human potential and promoting equality" in the spirit of The Giving Pledge.

In December 2013, Zuckerberg announced a donation of 18 million Facebook shares to the Silicon Valley Community Foundation, to be executed by the end of the month—based on Facebook's valuation as of then, the shares totaled $990 million in value. Later that month, the donation was recognized as the largest charitable gift on public record for that year. The Chronicle of Philanthropy placed Zuckerberg and his wife at the top of the magazine's annual list of 50 most generous Americans for 2013, having donated roughly $1 billion to charity.

In October 2014, Zuckerberg and his wife donated $25 million (equivalent to $33,999,859 in 2025) to combat the Ebola virus disease, specifically the West African Ebola virus epidemic. The couple endowed the foundation of the San Francisco General Hospital in February 2015 with $75 million (equivalent to $101,870,701 in 2025), which was the biggest individual donation to a U.S. public hospital. The hospital honored them by renaming itself as The Priscilla Chan and Mark Zuckerberg San Francisco General Hospital and Trauma Center. Later in 2020, the San Francisco Board of Supervisors passed a near-unanimous, non-binding measure condemning the renaming, citing concerns that a public hospital should not be named after an individual whose social media platform is accused of "endangering public health, spreading misinformation, and violating privacy". On December 1, 2015, the couple pledged to transfer 99% of their Facebook shares, then valued at $45 billion, to the Chan Zuckerberg Initiative (CZI). The funds would not be transferred immediately, but over the course of their lives. Instead of forming a charitable corporation to donate the stock to -- as Bill Gates, Warren Buffett, Larry Page, Sergey Brin and other billionaires have done -- Zuckerberg and Chan chose to use the structure of a limited liability company (LLC). Some journalists and academics have said the CZI conducts philanthrocapitalism.

In 2016, CZI gave $600 million (equivalent to $804,908,486 in 2025) to create the tax-exempt charity Chan Zuckerberg Biohub, a collaborative research space in San Francisco's Mission Bay district near the University of California, San Francisco, with the intent to foster interaction and collaboration between scientists at UCSF, University of California, Berkeley, and Stanford University. Intellectual property generated would be jointly owned by Biohub and the discoverer's home institution. Unlike foundations such as the Bill and Melinda Gates Foundation, which open up all research funded to unrestricted access and reuse by the public, Biohub retained the right to commercialize any research it funds. Inventors will have the option of making their discoveries open-source, with permission from Biohub. To increase access to scientific research and promote open science, CZ Biohub requires its investigators and staff scientists to publish submitted manuscripts and related data on preprints servers such as bioRxiv. Amidst the COVID-19 pandemic, Zuckerberg announced $25 million (equivalent to $31,101,324 in 2025) in grants to support local journalism that was impacted by the pandemic and $75 million (equivalent to $93,303,973 in 2025) in advertisement purchases in local newspapers by Facebook, Inc., where Facebook would market itself.

== Politics ==
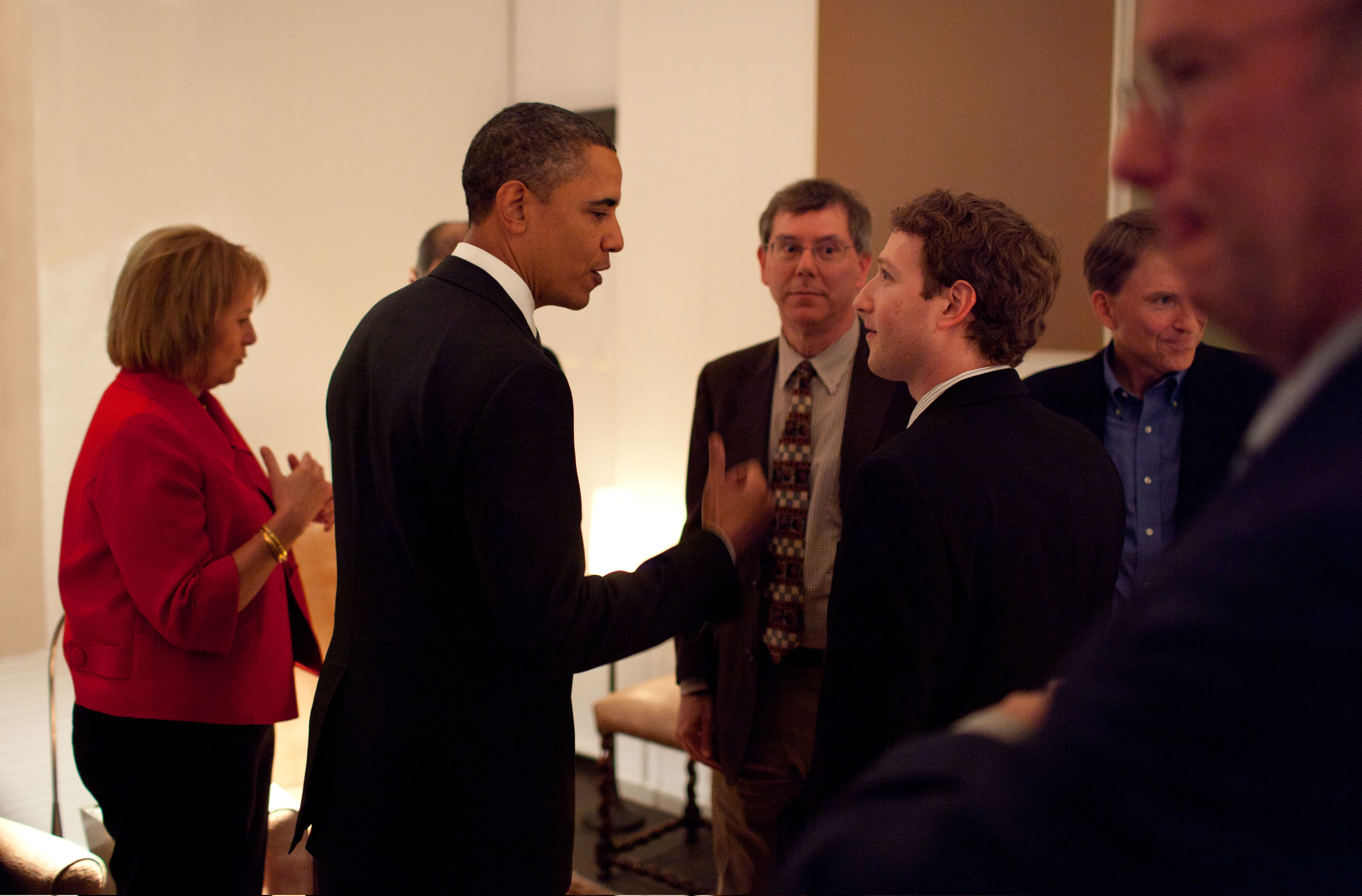
With Barack Obama before a private meeting between Obama and technology business leaders in February 2011

In 2002, Zuckerberg registered to vote in Westchester County, New York, where he grew up, but did not cast a ballot until November 2008. Then Santa Clara County Registrar of Voters Spokeswoman, Elma Rosas, told Bloomberg that Zuckerberg is listed as "no preference" on voter rolls, and he voted in at least two of the past three general elections, in 2008 and 2012.

Zuckerberg has never revealed his own political affiliation or voting history. In February 2013, Zuckerberg hosted his first ever fundraising event for then-New Jersey Governor Chris Christie. His particular interest on this occasion was education reform, and Christie's education reform work focused on teachers unions and the expansion of charter schools. Later that year, Zuckerberg hosted a campaign fundraiser for then-Newark mayor Cory Booker, who was running in the 2013 New Jersey special Senate election. In September 2010, with the support of Governor Chris Christie, Booker obtained a US$100 million (equivalent to $147,642,301 in 2025) pledge from Zuckerberg to Newark Public Schools. In December 2012, Zuckerberg donated 18 million shares to the Silicon Valley Community Foundation, a community organization that includes education in its list of grant-making areas.

Zuckerberg with Japanese Prime Minister Shinzo Abe in Tokyo, October 2014

On April 11, 2013, Zuckerberg led the launch of a 501(c)(4) lobbying group called FWD.us. The founders and contributors to the group were primarily Silicon Valley entrepreneurs and investors, and its president was Joe Green, a close friend of Zuckerberg. The goals of the group include immigration reform, improving the state of education in the United States, and enabling more technological breakthroughs that benefit the public, yet it has also been criticized for financing ads advocating a variety of oil and gas development initiatives, including drilling in the Arctic National Wildlife Refuge and the Keystone XL pipeline. In 2013, numerous liberal and progressive groups, such as The League of Conservation Voters, MoveOn.org, the Sierra Club, Democracy for America, CREDO, Daily Kos, 350.org, and Presente and Progressives United agreed to either not buy or pull their Facebook ads for at least two weeks, in protest of ads funded by FWD.us that were in support of oil drilling and the Keystone XL pipeline, and in opposition to Obamacare among Republican United States senators who back immigration reform.

A media report on June 20, 2013, revealed that Zuckerberg actively engaged with Facebook users on his own profile page after the online publication of a FWD.us video. In response to a claim that the FWD.us organization is "just about tech wanting to hire more people", the Internet entrepreneur replied, "The bigger problem we're trying to address is ensuring the 11 million undocumented folks living in this country now and similar folks in the future are treated fairly."

In June 2013, Zuckerberg joined Facebook employees in a company float as part of the annual San Francisco Lesbian, Gay, Bisexual, and Transgender Pride Celebration. The company first participated in the event in 2011, with 70 employees, and this number increased to 700 for the 2013 march. The 2013 pride celebration was especially significant, as it followed a U.S. Supreme Court ruling that deemed the Defense of Marriage Act (DOMA) unconstitutional.

When questioned about the mid-2013 PRISM scandal at the TechCrunch Disrupt conference in September 2013, Zuckerberg stated that the U.S. government "blew it". He further explained that the government performed poorly in regard to the protection of the freedoms of its citizens, the economy, and companies.

Zuckerberg with Indian Prime Minister Narendra Modi at Facebook headquarters in Menlo Park, California, September 2015

Zuckerberg placed a statement on his Facebook wall on December 9, 2015, which said that he wants "to add my voice in support of Muslims in our community and around the world" in response to the aftermath of the November 2015 Paris attacks and the 2015 San Bernardino attack. The statement also said that Muslims are "always welcome" on Facebook, and that his position was a result of the fact that, "as a Jew, my parents taught me that we must stand up against attacks on all communities."

On February 24, 2016, Zuckerberg sent out a company-wide internal memo to employees formally rebuking employees who had crossed out handwritten "Black Lives Matter" phrases on the company walls and had written "All Lives Matter" in their place. Facebook allows employees to free-write thoughts and phrases on company walls. The memo was then leaked by several employees. As Zuckerberg had previously condemned this practice at previous company meetings, and other similar requests had been issued by other leaders at Facebook, Zuckerberg wrote in the memo that he would now consider this overwriting practice not only disrespectful, but "malicious as well". According to Zuckerberg's memo, "Black Lives Matter doesn't mean other lives don't – it's simply asking that the black community also achieves the justice they deserve." The memo also noted that the act of crossing something out in itself "means silencing speech, or that one person's speech is more important than another's". Zuckerberg also said in the memo that he would be launching investigations into the incidents. The New York Daily News interviewed Facebook employees who commented anonymously that, "Zuckerberg was genuinely angry about the incident and it really encouraged staff that Zuckerberg showed a clear understanding of why the phrase 'Black Lives Matter' must exist, as well as why writing through it is a form of harassment and erasure."

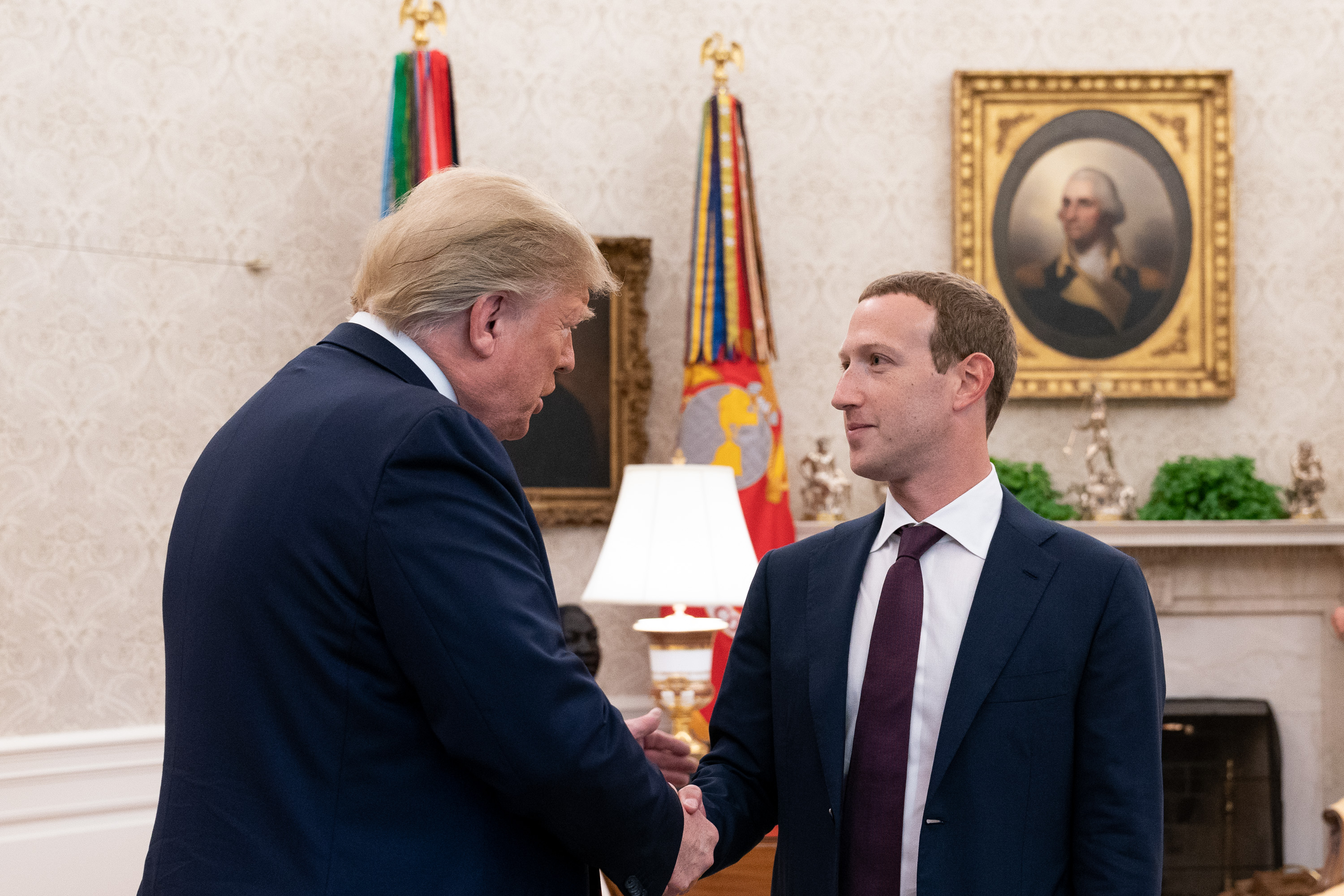
With then-President Donald Trump at the White House in September 2019

In January 2017, Zuckerberg criticized Donald Trump's executive order to harshly limit immigrants and refugees from some countries. He also funded a state-level ballot initiative for the 2020 general election that would raise taxes by altering California's Proposition 13 to require the tax assessment of commercial and industrial properties in the state at market rate.

Especially in his twenties, Zuckerberg had financially supported various progressive causes such as immigration reform and social justice. At least among Republicans, he was generally seen as pro-liberal. In an August 2024 letter to the House Judiciary Committee however, Zuckerberg stated he regretted not doing more to resist pressure from the Biden administration to censor content related to COVID-19. He also noted he no longer intends to donate towards election infrastructure; Republicans had seen those contributions as non-neutral, labeling them "Zuckerbucks". By 2024, Zuckerberg was discouraging employee activism at Facebook, and according to The New York Times, had privately described his politics as leaning towards libertarianism or classical liberalism.

Zuckerberg with Donald Trump, David Sacks and Chamath Palihapitiya at a dinner for technology leaders in the State Dining Room of the White House, September 2025

In Donald Trump's book Save America, published in September 2024, Trump described Zuckerberg's visits to the White House and wrote, "We are watching him closely, and if he does anything illegal this time he will spend the rest of his life in prison — as will others who cheat in the 2024 Presidential Election." Two months later, they dined at the Mar-a-Lago resort, with Zuckerberg reportedly aiming to mend his and his firm's relationship with Trump after the latter won the election. Around the same time, Meta reportedly donated $1 million to a Trump-related fund. In January 2025, he said: "We now have a U.S. administration that is proud of our leading companies, prioritizes American technology winning and that will defend our values and interests abroad." Zuckerberg was one of a handful of technology leaders positioned prominently at Trump's inauguration. In March 2025, Zuckerberg mentioned his relationship with the Trump administration while seeking a favorable settlement in, FTC v. Meta, an antitrust case where the Federal Trade Commission (FTC) was asking for $30 billion.

Zuckerberg has expressed opposition to EU regulations of his company saying "we're going to work with President Trump to push back on governments around the world that're going after American companies."

== Personal life ==
=== Marriage and children ===
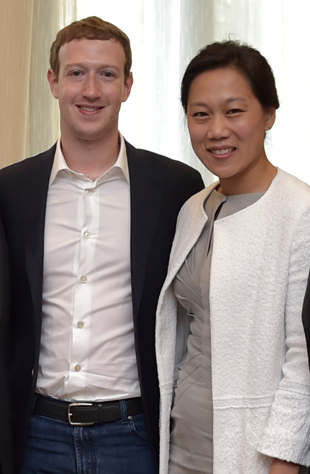
With his wife, Priscilla Chan, in 2014

Zuckerberg met fellow student Priscilla Chan at a frat party during his second year at Harvard. They went on their first date on November 13, 2003. In September 2010, Chan, who was a medical student at the University of California, San Francisco at the time, moved into his rented house in Palo Alto, California. They married on May 19, 2012, in the grounds of his mansion in an event that also celebrated her graduation from medical school.

Zuckerberg revealed in July 2015 that they were expecting a baby girl and that Chan had previously experienced three miscarriages. Their first daughter was born in December 2015. They announced in a Chinese New Year video that their daughter's Chinese name is Chen Mingyu (Chinese: 陈明宇). Their second daughter was born in August 2017. Zuckerberg and his wife welcomed their third daughter in March 2023 and announced the news across his social media pages.

The couple also have a Puli dog named Beast, who had over two million followers on Facebook as of 2019. Zuckerberg commissioned the visual artist Daniel Arsham to build a 7-foot-tall sculpture of his wife, which was unveiled in 2024.

As of 2025, the Zuckerberg family lives on a large compound in the Crescent Park neighborhood of Palo Alto. In November 2025, WIRED published an investigation of complaints from neighbors about a school that was operating on the Zuckerberg property without a permit.

In March 2026, Zuckerberg and Chan purchased a home on Indian Creek, Florida, a wealthy enclave known as the "Billionaires' Bunker", for a Miami-Dade County record of $170 million, an unfinished home that had an asking price of $200 million.

In August 2026, it was announced that Zuckerberg and Chan purchased Strancally Castle in County Waterford, Ireland.

=== Recognition and public image ===
Time named Zuckerberg one of the most influential people in the world in 2008, 2011, 2016, 2019 and 2025, and nominated him as a finalist several other times. He was named the Time Person of the Year in 2010, the same year when Facebook eclipsed more than half a billion users. He was also included in the Time 100 AI list in 2024. In December 2016, Zuckerberg was ranked tenth on the Forbes list of the World's Most Powerful People. In the Forbes 400 list of wealthiest Americans in 2023, he was ranked eighth with a personal wealth of $106 billion (equivalent to $1.12008519004×10^{11} in 2025). In October 2024, he became the second richest person in the world. As of October 2025, Zuckerberg's net worth was estimated at $251 billion by Forbes, making him the third richest person in the world. In addition to his estate in Hawaii, Zuckerberg has a $320 million (equivalent to $380,203,856 in 2025) real estate portfolio that includes ten homes in Palo Alto, San Francisco, and Lake Tahoe, totaling over 1,400 acres.

Zuckerberg shifted his style in 2024. Originally known wearing the same gray shirt and jeans in most public appearances, Zuckerberg started wearing gold chains and trendier streetwear. Writing for Vanity Fair, Kase Wickman described Zuckerberg's "new look" as a "MAGA rebrand", claiming that his change in fashion parallels Meta's efforts to appease the Trump administration. Zuckerberg denied hiring a stylist.

=== Yacht fleet ===
In 2017, Zuckerberg called for action to stop global warming in a commencement speech at Harvard University. Seven years later, he purchased the mega-yacht Launchpad (formerly Project 1010) for about $300 million; the vessel is approximately 118–119 m (387 ft) and was delivered by Feadship in 2024.

Zuckerberg also operates a smaller support/shadow yacht, Wingman, built by Damen Yachting in 2014 (approx. 67 m/220 ft), which functions as a tender and logistics platform for Launchpad; media have placed its value around $30 million. In early 2025, multiple outlets reported the two-vessel fleet operating together, including in the Arctic. Launchpad was tracked at Longyearbyen (Svalbard), where local activists staged protests over emissions.

During the Easter period of 2025, Sustainability Times described a roughly 5,280-mile voyage to Norway's fjords using the two-yacht fleet for a heliskiing trip. The article asserted by using Wingman's helipad offshore, operations avoided helicopter landings on Norwegian soil, which are generally restricted for tourism. Earlier, in late 2024 and early 2025, lifestyle media reported that Launchpad sailed roughly 4,800 miles to French Polynesia and waited in Tahiti for weeks without Zuckerberg boarding.

=== Religious beliefs and other interests ===
Born and raised in a Reform Jewish household, Zuckerberg later identified as an atheist. However, he said in 2016 that, "I went through a period where I questioned things, but now I believe religion is very important." During 2017, he and his wife began a tour of America "to visit every state in the union and learn more about a sliver of the nearly two billion people who regularly use the social network". He met with farmers and business owners, and spoke at the Emanuel African Methodist Episcopal Church, where a 2015 shooting took place.

In 2022, Zuckerberg took up training in both mixed martial arts (MMA) and Brazilian jiu-jitsu (BJJ), and has been open about his love for the two sports. He competed in a BJJ tournament on May 6, 2023, and won both a silver and gold medal in gi and no gi, competing at white belt. In July 2023, he was promoted to blue belt in Brazilian jiu-jitsu by Dave Camarillo. Four months later, Zuckerberg announced that he was preparing to make his MMA debut but had suffered an anterior cruciate ligament injury in training that required surgery and had delayed this.

== See also ==
- Mark Zuckerberg book club
