= Greenwich Country Day School =

Coordinates: 41.0481°N 73.6147°W

The Greenwich Country Day School
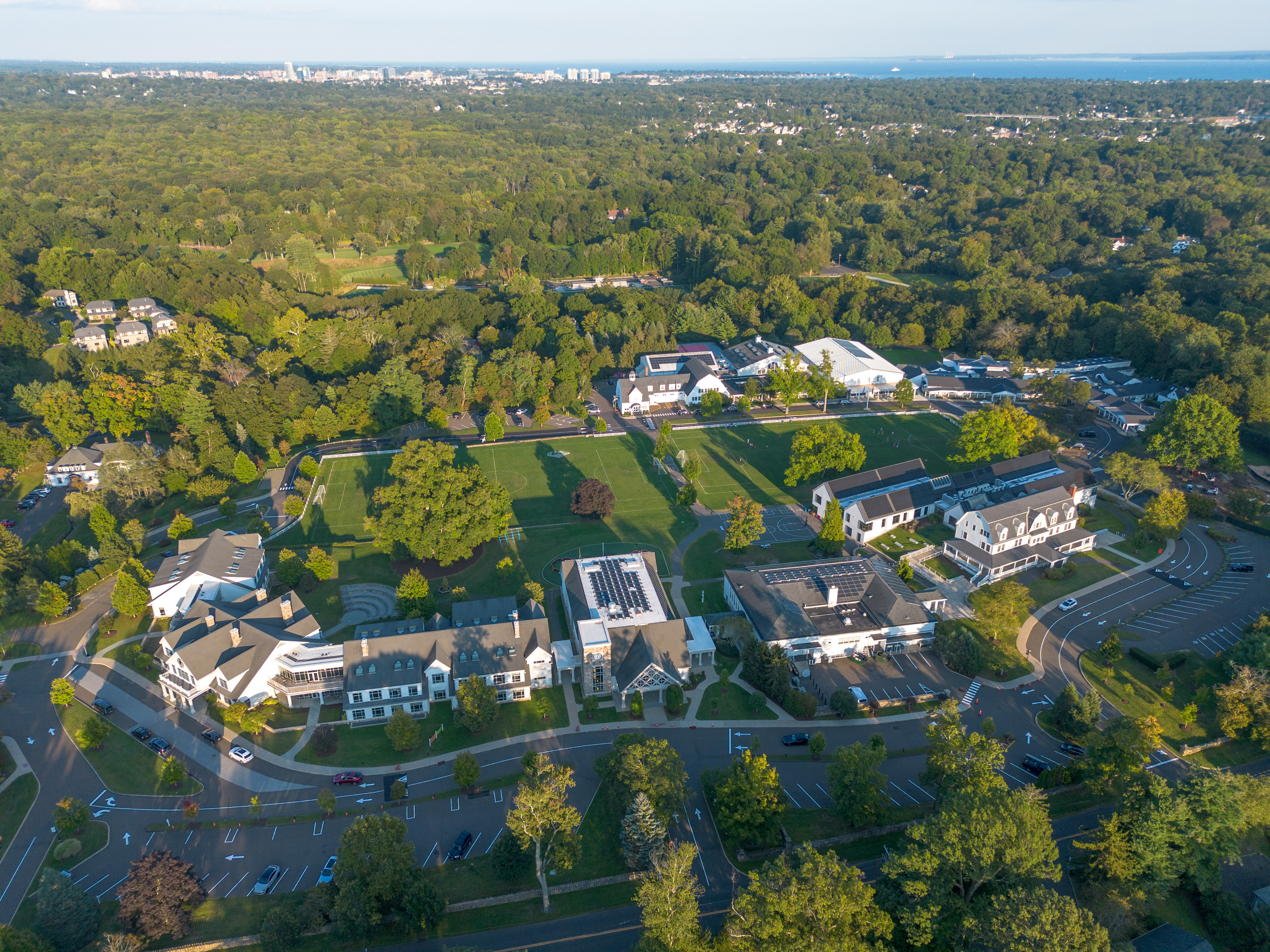
- Aerial in 2025

Location
- Old Church Road, P.O. Box 623; Greenwich, Connecticut 06836-0623; United States

Information
- Type: Co-educational, Nursery-12
- Motto: Cogito, Ludus, Mores (Latin) (Studies, Play, Character)
- Established: 1926
- Headmaster: Adam Rohdie
- Staff: 100
- Faculty: 240
- Enrollment: 1252
- Campus: 92 acres in central Greenwich
- Colors: Orange and black
- Fight song: Oh Greenwich Country Day
- Sports: 17 sports
- Mascot: The Tiger
- Tuition: US$39,390 - US$51,500
- Affiliation: Private, independent
- Website: www.gcds.net

The Greenwich Country Day School is a co-educational, independent day school in Greenwich, Connecticut, United States, founded in 1926. As of 2019, it enrolled some 1190 students from nursery to 12th grade level. In November 2017, Greenwich Country Day acquired The Stanwich School, making it the only independent nursery through 12th grade co-educational school in Greenwich. The Head of School of GCDS is Adam Rohdie. The head of the high school is Chris Winters, former Greenwich High School principal.

It is accredited by the State of Connecticut through the New England Association of Schools and Colleges and is a member of the National Association of Independent Schools. The school is located on a rolling campus set into a series of hills. The Old Church Road campus is divided into three distinct schools, and the Upper School is on a separate campus on Stanwich Road. The two campuses are separated by less than two miles.

== Notable alumni ==
- Byrdie Bell, actress
- Neil Burger, movie director
- George H. W. Bush, 41st President of the United States
- Hadley Delany, actress and model
- Theodore Forstmann, financier
- Bryce Dallas Howard, actress, daughter of director Ron Howard
- Stephanie McMahon, WWE personality, daughter of WWE founder Vince McMahon
- Donovan Mitchell, professional basketball player for the Cleveland Cavaliers
- Jen Psaki, former White House Press Secretary
- Helen Resor, Olympic hockey player
- Bill Simmons, former ESPN columnist, TV personality, New York Times best-selling author, and owner of The Ringer
- McLain Ward, Olympic equestrian show jumper
- Cameron Winklevoss, Olympic rower and social networking pioneer
- Tyler Winklevoss, Olympic rower and social networking pioneer
