= ConnectU =

2000s social networking website

ConnectU Inc.
- Website type: Social network service
- Founded: December 2002; Cambridge, Massachusetts, U.S.
- Area served: Worldwide
- Founders: Cameron Winklevoss; Tyler Winklevoss; Divya Narendra
- Products: ConnectU.com, i2hub.com, Jungalu.com, StallScribbles.com, Digital Flyers, ConnectHi (theyearbook.org), ConnectGroups, The Winklevoss Chang Group Representative Program, The Rep Center, Social Butterfly
- Registration: Required
- Launched: May 21, 2004; 22 years ago (as HarvardConnection)
- Current status: Defunct

ConnectU (originally HarvardConnection) was a social networking website launched on May 21, 2004, that was founded by Harvard students Cameron Winklevoss, Tyler Winklevoss, and Divya Narendra in December 2002. Users could add people as friends, send them messages, and update their personal profiles to notify friends about themselves. Users were placed in networks based upon the domain name associated with the email address they used for registration.

== History ==
In December 2002, Harvard students and friends Cameron Winklevoss, Tyler Winklevoss, and Divya Narendra wanted a better way to connect with fellow students at Harvard and other universities. As a result, the three conceived of a social network for Harvard students named HarvardConnection, which was to expand to other schools around the country. In January 2003, they enlisted the help of fellow Harvard student, programmer and friend Sanjay Mavinkurve to begin building HarvardConnection. Sanjay commenced work on HarvardConnection but left the project in the spring of 2003 when he graduated and went to work for Google.

After the departure of Sanjay Mavinkurve, the Winklevosses and Narendra approached Narendra's friend, Harvard student and programmer Victor Gao to work on HarvardConnection. Gao, a senior in Mather House, had opted not to become a full partner in the venture, instead agreeing to be paid in a work for hire capacity on a rolling basis. He was paid $400 for his work on the website code during the second half of 2003, then excused himself thereafter due to personal obligations.

=== Mark Zuckerberg ===
In November 2003, upon the referral of Victor Gao, the Winklevosses and Narendra approached Mark Zuckerberg about joining the HarvardConnection team. By this point, the previous HarvardConnection programmers had already made progress on a large amount of the coding: front-end pages, the registration system, a database, back-end coding, and a way users could connect with each other, which Gao called a "handshake". In early November, Narendra emailed Zuckerberg saying, "We're very deep into developing a site which we would like you to be a part of and ... which we know will make some waves on campus." Within days, Zuckerberg was talking to the HarvardConnection team and preparing to take over programming duties from Gao.

On the evening of November 25, 2003, the Winklevosses and Narendra met with Zuckerberg in the dining hall of Harvard's Kirkland House, where they explained to Zuckerberg the HarvardConnection website, the plan to expand to other schools after launch, the confidential nature of the project, and the importance of getting there first. During the meeting, Zuckerberg allegedly entered into an oral contract with Narendra and the Winklevosses and became a partner in HarvardConnection. He was given the private server location and password for the unfinished HarvardConnection website and code, with the understanding that he would finish the programming necessary for launch. Zuckerberg allegedly chose to be compensated in the form of sweat equity.

On November 30, 2003, Zuckerberg told Cameron Winklevoss in an email that he did not expect completion of the project to be difficult. Zuckerberg wrote: "I read over all the stuff you sent and it seems like it shouldn't take too long to implement, so we can talk about that after I get all the basic functionality up tomorrow night." The next day, on December 1, 2003, Zuckerberg sent another email to the HarvardConnection team. "I put together one of the two registration pages so I have everything working on my system now. I'll keep you posted as I patch stuff up and it starts to become completely functional." On December 4, 2003, Zuckerberg writes: "Sorry I was unreachable tonight. I just got about three of your missed calls. I was working on a problem set."

On December 10, 2003: "The week has been pretty busy thus far, so I haven't gotten a chance to do much work on the site or even think about it really, so I think it's probably best to postpone meeting until we have more to discuss. I'm also really busy tomorrow so I don't think I'd be able to meet then anyway." A week later: "Sorry I have not been reachable for the past few days. I've basically been in the lab the whole time working on a cs problem set which I'm still not finished with." On December 17, 2003, Zuckerberg met with the Winklevosses and Narendra in his dorm room, allegedly confirming his interest and assuring them that the site was almost complete. On the whiteboard in his room, Zuckerberg allegedly had scrawled multiple lines of code under the heading "Harvard Connection," and this would be the only time they saw any of his work.

On January 8, 2004, Zuckerberg emailed to say he was "completely swamped with work [that] week" but had "made some of the changes ... and they seem[ed] to be working great" on his computer. He said he could discuss the site starting the following Tuesday, on January 13, 2004. On January 11, 2004, Zuckerberg registered the domain name thefacebook.com. On January 12, 2004, Zuckerberg e-mailed Eduardo Saverin, saying that the site thefacebook.com was almost complete and that they should discuss marketing strategies. Two days later, on January 14, 2004, Zuckerberg met again with the HarvardConnection team; he never mentioned registering the domain name thefacebook.com nor a competing social networking website, rather he reported progress on HarvardConnection, told them he would continue to work on it, and would email the group later in the week. On February 4, 2004, Zuckerberg launched thefacebook.com, a social network for Harvard students, designed to expand to other schools around the country.

On February 6, 2004, the Winklevosses and Narendra first learned of thefacebook.com while reading a press release in the Harvard student newspaper The Harvard Crimson. According to Gao, who looked at the HarvardConnection code afterward, Zuckerberg had left the HarvardConnection code incomplete and non-functional, with a registration that did not connect with the back-end connections. On February 10, 2004, the Winklevosses and Narendra sent Zuckerberg a cease and desist letter. They also asked the Harvard administration to act on what they viewed as a violation of the university's honor code and student handbook. They lodged a complaint with the Harvard Administrative Board and university president Larry Summers, but both viewed the matter to be outside of the university's jurisdiction. President Summers advised the HarvardConnection team to take their matter to the courts.

The About section of the ConnectU website included this sentence, which was live on December 4, 2004: "We've cycled through several programmers, even one who stole our ideas to create a competing site, without informing us of his intentions."

==== Leaked instant messages ====
Between November 29, 2003, and February 4, 2004, Zuckerberg exchanged a total of 52 emails with the HarvardConnection team and engaged in several in-person meetings. In this period, Zuckerberg engaged in multiple electronic instant message communications with people outside of the HarvardConnection team. On March 5, 2010, certain electronic instant messages from Mark Zuckerberg's hard drive were leaked. On September 20, 2010, Facebook confirmed the authenticity of these leaked instant messages in a New Yorker article.

== The Winklevoss Chang Group ==
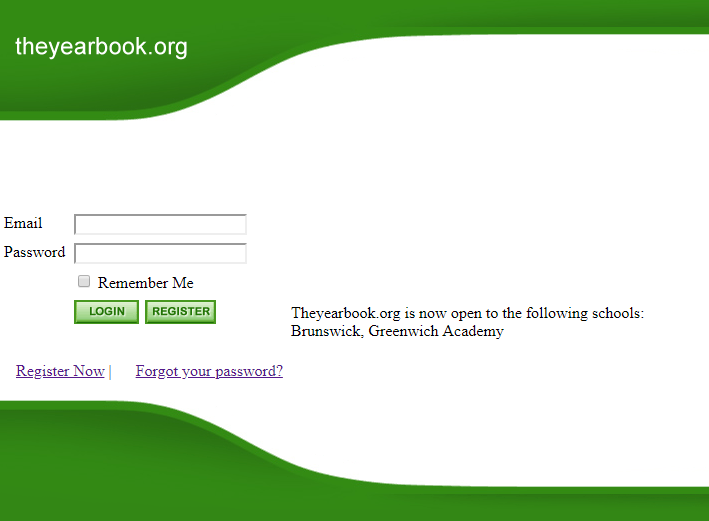
Screenshot of Connecthi.com (aka theyearbook.org) in February 2005

A partnership allegedly formed between i2hub, a popular peer-to-peer service at the time, and ConnectU (HarvardConnection). The partnership, called The Winklevoss Chang Group, jointly advertised their properties through bus advertisements as well as public press releases. i2hub integrated its popular software with ConnectU's website, as part of the partnership. The team also jointly launched several projects and initiatives, including:

- Jungalu.com, an internet-based book exchange
- StallScribbles.com, an online "anonymous confessions" board
- Digital Flyers, a portal for purchasing advertisements to be placed on the various WCG sites and on i2hub
- ConnectHi (also known as ConnectHigh and theyearbook.org), an effort to penetrate the high school social network "scene"
- ConnectGroups, an initiative to provide clubs and organizations with a means for their members to communicate online with each other about their organizations
- The Winklevoss Chang Representative Program, a sales representative program which WCG used to establish a presence on college campuses and to promote ConnectU and the other WCG properties
- The Rep Center, an internet-based portal, accessible through ConnectU.com, providing a centralized location for the representatives of The Winklevoss Chang Representative Program to communicate and earn points (redeemable for prizes) by recruiting and signing up new users for all of WCG's properties
- Social Butterfly, a feature added to ConnectU to allow users to consolidate their accounts at various social networking sites, such as Facebook, and make that information accessible through ConnectU
- US Patent Application 20060212395, related to a method of purchasing of copyrighted computer files through affinity programs, such as using points from a credit card to purchase copyrighted movies.

== Lawsuits ==
=== Facebook lawsuits ===
Recording of oral arguments in the Ninth Circuit Court of Appeals

In 2004, ConnectU filed a lawsuit against Facebook alleging that creator Mark Zuckerberg had breached an oral contract to develop ConnectU and used their source code and idea to create TheFacebook.com. The suit alleged that Zuckerberg had copied their idea and illegally used source code intended for the website he was hired to create. Facebook countersued in regard to Social Butterfly, a project put out by The Winklevoss Chang Group. It named among the defendants ConnectU, Cameron Winklevoss, Tyler Winklevoss, Divya Narendra, and Wayne Chang, founder of i2hub. A settlement agreement for both cases was reached in February 2008, reportedly valued at $65 million. This included buying the domain name ConnectU.com and shutting it down. In May 2010, it was reported that ConnectU was accusing Facebook of securities fraud on the value of the stock that was part of the settlement and wanted to get the settlement undone. According to ConnectU's allegations, the stock was worth $11 million instead of $45 million that Facebook presented at the time of settlement. This meant the settlement value, at the time, was $31 million, instead of the $65 million. On August 26, 2010, The New York Times reported that Facebook shares were trading at $76 per share in the secondary market, putting the total settlement value at close to $120 million. If the lawsuit adjusted the settlement to match the difference, the value would quadruple to over $466 million.

In May 2011, after the Court of Appeals found against the Winklevosses, the twins announced that they would petition the Supreme Court of the United States to hear the case. In June 2011 the Winklevosses, in a filing with the 9th U.S. Circuit Court of Appeals, said that "after careful consideration," they would not file their petition with the U.S. Supreme Court. In a new filing, the Winklevoss brothers and their business partner Divya Narendra asked the judge to investigate whether Facebook "intentionally or inadvertently suppressed evidence."

=== Quinn Emanuel lawsuits ===
One of ConnectU's law firms, Quinn Emanuel, disclosed the confidential settlement amount in marketing material by printing "WON $65 million settlement against Facebook". Quinn Emanuel sought $13 million of the settlement as part of a contingency agreement. ConnectU fired Quinn Emanuel and sued the law firm for malpractice. On August 25, 2010, an arbitration panel ruled that Quinn Emanuel "earned its full contingency fee". It also found that Quinn Emanuel committed no malpractice.

=== The Winklevoss Chang Group lawsuit ===
On December 21, 2009, i2hub founder Wayne Chang and The i2hub Organization launched a lawsuit against ConnectU and its founders, Cameron Winklevoss, Tyler Winklevoss, and Divya Narendra, seeking 50% of the settlement. The complaint says "The Winklevosses and Howard Winklevoss filed [a] patent application, U.S. Patent Application No 20060212395, on or around March 15, 2005, but did not list Chang as a co-inventor." It also states "Through this litigation, Chang asserts his ownership interest in The Winklevoss Chang Group and ConnectU, including the settlement proceeds." Lee Gesmer (of law firm Gesmer Updegrove, LLP) posted the 33-page complaint online.

On May 13, 2011, it was reported that Judge Peter Lauriat had made a ruling against the Winklevosses. Chang's case against them could proceed. The Winklevosses argued that the court lacked jurisdiction because the settlement with Facebook had not been distributed and therefore Chang had not suffered any injury. Judge Lauriat wrote, "The flaw in this argument is that defendants appear to conflate loss of the settlement proceed with a loss of rights. Chang alleges that he has received nothing in return for the substantial benefits he provided to ConnectU, including the value of his work, as well as i2hub's users and goodwill." Lauriat also wrote that, although Chang's claims to the settlement are "too speculative to confer standing, his claims with respect to ownership in ConnectU are not. They constitute an injury separate and distinct from his possible share of the settlement proceeds. The court concludes that Chang has pled sufficient facts to confer standing with respect to his claims against the Winklevoss defendants."

On December 24, 2014, summary judgment in favor of the Winklevosses was granted. Chang's suit sought a portion of the settlement via two independent arguments. The first, that he formed a partnership with the Winklevosses, was dismissed based on a May 25, 2005 chat, where the partnership was dissolved. The second, a memorandum of understanding granting him the option to acquire a fifteen percent stake in ConnectU, was ruled a contract claim against ConnectU, the corporation, not the Winklevosses, former shareholders.

== In popular culture ==
The story of the relationship between ConnectU and Facebook is depicted in The Social Network, a film directed by David Fincher and written by Aaron Sorkin, based on the book The Accidental Billionaires by Ben Mezrich.
