= Wirehog =

File Sharing Software

Wirehog's website allowed students at a few schools to download the beta software.

Wirehog was a friend-to-friend file sharing program that was linked to Facebook and allowed people to transfer files directly between computers.

== History ==
Wirehog was created by Andrew McCollum, Mark Zuckerberg, Adam D'Angelo, and Sean Parker during their development of the Facebook social networking website in Palo Alto in the summer and fall of 2004. The only way to join Wirehog was through an invitation from a member and although it was originally planned as an integrated feature of Facebook, it could also be used by friends who were not registered on Facebook. Wirehog was launched in October 2004, and taken down in January 2006. Its target audience at the time was the same as the campus-only file-sharing service i2hub that had launched earlier that year. i2hub was gaining a lot of traction and growing rapidly. In an interview with The Harvard Crimson, Zuckerberg said, "I think Wirehog will probably spread in the same way that thefacebook did." During an early investing pitch to notable early Facebook seed round investors, Peter Thiel and Reid Hoffman in 2004, Hoffman told Zuckerberg to "abandon Wirehog" in favor of "thefacebook" project.

The software was described by its creators as "an HTTP file transfer system using dynamic DNS and NAT traversal to make your personal computer addressable, routable and easily accessible". The client allowed users to both access data stored on their home computer from a remote location and let friends exchange files between each other's computers. In ways, Wirehog was a project comparable to Alex Pankratov's Hamachi VPN, the open-source OneSwarm private network, or the darknet RetroShare software.

Facebook hosted information regarding their Wirehog service and suggested users email Facebook with questions regarding the software.

Until at least July 2005, Facebook officially endorsed the p2p client, saying on their website:

"Wirehog is a social application that lets friends exchange files of any type with each other over the web. Facebook and Wirehog are integrated so that Wirehog knows who your friends are in order to make sure that only people in your network can see your files. Facebook certifies that it is okay to enter your facebook email address and password into Wirehog for the purposes of this integration."

The Wirehog software was written in Python and was available for Microsoft Windows and Mac OS X only. A Linux version had been promised on the service's website. The service ran a custom-written HTTP server, and file downloading and photo viewing was through the web browser, with requested authentication by Wirehog's central servers to allow users to set up custom privacy settings.

== See also ==
- Friend-to-friend
- Private P2P
- Virtual private network
