= Stanwich School =

The Greenwich Country Day School

Location
- Greenwich, Connecticut; USA; 33°50′56″N 84°25′00″W

Information
- Type: Private, Coeducational
- Established: 1926
- Head teacher: Adam Rohdie
- Faculty: 80
- Enrollment: 350 (PK-12)
- Campus: Suburban
- Colors: Orange and Black
- Mascot: Tiger
- Website: https://www.gcds.net/

The Stanwich School was a private, coeducational PK-12 college prep school, in Greenwich, Connecticut, established in 1998. The Stanwich School was accredited by the New England Association of Schools and Colleges and is a member of the National Association of Independent Schools.

== History ==
The Stanwich School was conceived by Patricia Young, the founding Head of School, and Dan Reid, the founding chairman of the board of trustees. Young envisioned a school that could instill in its students values based on Judeo-Christian principles and traditions.

In November 2017, The Stanwich School merged with Greenwich Country Day School with plans to build a new high school on the Stanwich Road campus.
