= Howard Winklevoss =

American actuary (born 1943)

Howard Edward Winklevoss Jr. (born September 1, 1943) is an American actuary. He is an academic and entrepreneur who has a practice in benefits management.

== Work ==
Winklevoss is a former adjunct professor of insurance at the Wharton School of the University of Pennsylvania. He is a graduate of Grove City College and received a DBA in actuarial science from the University of Oregon. He has written more than 20 books, including Pension Mathematics with Numerical Illustrations. He is also the founder of Winklevoss Consultants and Winklevoss Technologies.

Winklevoss is the father of athletes and entrepreneurs Cameron and Tyler Winklevoss.

== Selected bibliography ==
- Pension Mathematics with Numerical Illustrations (1977, 2d ed. 1993)
- Public Pension Plans: Standards of Design, Funding, and Reporting (1979, with Dan McGill)
