= Andrew McCollum =

American angel investor and businessman (born 1983)

- Born: September 4, 1983 (age 43); California, U.S
- Education: Harvard University (SB, MEd)
- Occupations: Angel investor and CEO of Philo
- Known for: Co-founding Facebook

Andrew McCollum (born September 4, 1983) is an American angel investor and businessman. He is a co-founder of Facebook and the current executive chairman of Philo.

== Education ==
McCollum attended Harvard University with co-founder Mark Zuckerberg and others on the founding team. He worked at Facebook from February 2004 till September 2007. Initially, he worked on Wirehog, a file-sharing program, together with Adam D'Angelo. McCollum returned to Harvard College and graduated in 2007 with a bachelor's degree in computer science. He later earned a master's degree in education from the Harvard Graduate School of Education.

McCollum was a member of the Harvard team that competed in the 31st Association for Computing Machinery International Collegiate Programming Contest in Tokyo, having placed second in the regional competitions behind Massachusetts Institute of Technology.

== Career ==
McCollum was the cofounder of JobSpice, an online resume preparation tool. He currently acts as Entrepreneur in Residence at New Enterprise Associates and Flybridge Capital Partners. In November 2014, McCollum was announced as new Philo CEO, succeeding Christopher Thorpe.

== Personal life ==
McCollum married Gretchen Sisson, a sociology postdoc, in June 2012.
