= Wesley Gray =

American academic

Wesley R. Gray is an American author, veteran and a former assistant professor of finance. He is best known for his book, EMBEDDED: A Marine Corps Adviser Inside the Iraqi Army, an account of his eight-month military assignment in Iraq.

== Early life ==
Raised on a cattle ranch in Colorado and having spent part of his youth in Northern California, Gray graduated magna cum laude from the Wharton School of the University of Pennsylvania with a Bachelor of Science degree in economics in 2002. After graduating, he enrolled at the University of Chicago.

== Military service ==
In 2004, Gray took a four-year sabbatical from his studies to serve as an intelligence officer in the United States Marine Corps. He spent his first two years as an intelligence officer in Asia. In 2006, Marine lieutenant Gray served on a Military Transition Team in Haditha, Iraq as part of Operation Iraqi Freedom. There he served as an embedded officer providing advice, mentoring and support to the Iraqi in place of U.S. Special Forces who were spread too thin to perform the task. Following his service, he became a captain in the United States Marine Corps Reserve.

== Post-military career ==
Gray wrote EMBEDDED: A Marine Corps Adviser Inside the Iraqi Army, which was released in April 2009 and published by the U.S. Naval Institute Press. The 240-page book came from 1000 pages of personal notes that he logged during his eight-month military assignment in Iraq to share with his wife and daughter. Graeme Sligo, reviewing the book for the Australian Army Journal, concluded that it "is a well-written description of what it was like to be an adviser to an Iraqi Army file unit in Anbar Province." After his service he obtained both a M.B.A. and a Ph.D. in finance from the University of Chicago's Booth School of Business in 2010.

In 2010, Gray founded an investment startup with Carl Kanner and initially managed money for a billionaire family. In December 2012, Gray and co-author Tobias Carlisle had QUANTITATIVE VALUE: A Practitioner's Guide to Automating Intelligent Investment and Eliminating Behavioral Errors published by John Wiley & Sons. Gray is the founder and Executive Managing Member of both Empiritrage, LLC and Turnkey Analyst, LLC. He is also an Assistant Professor of Finance at Drexel University's LeBow College of Business. He has stated that as of November 2014, his Alpha Architect financial services company managed $200 million in assets and employed 10 full-time employees. By December 2014, the company launched a second exchange-traded fund (ETF)—following its October initial offering.

== Personal life ==
Gray's wife is named Katie. They have two daughters and a son. During his time in the Marine Corps, Gray learned to speak Arabic.
