= Cameron Winklevoss =

American businessman and rower

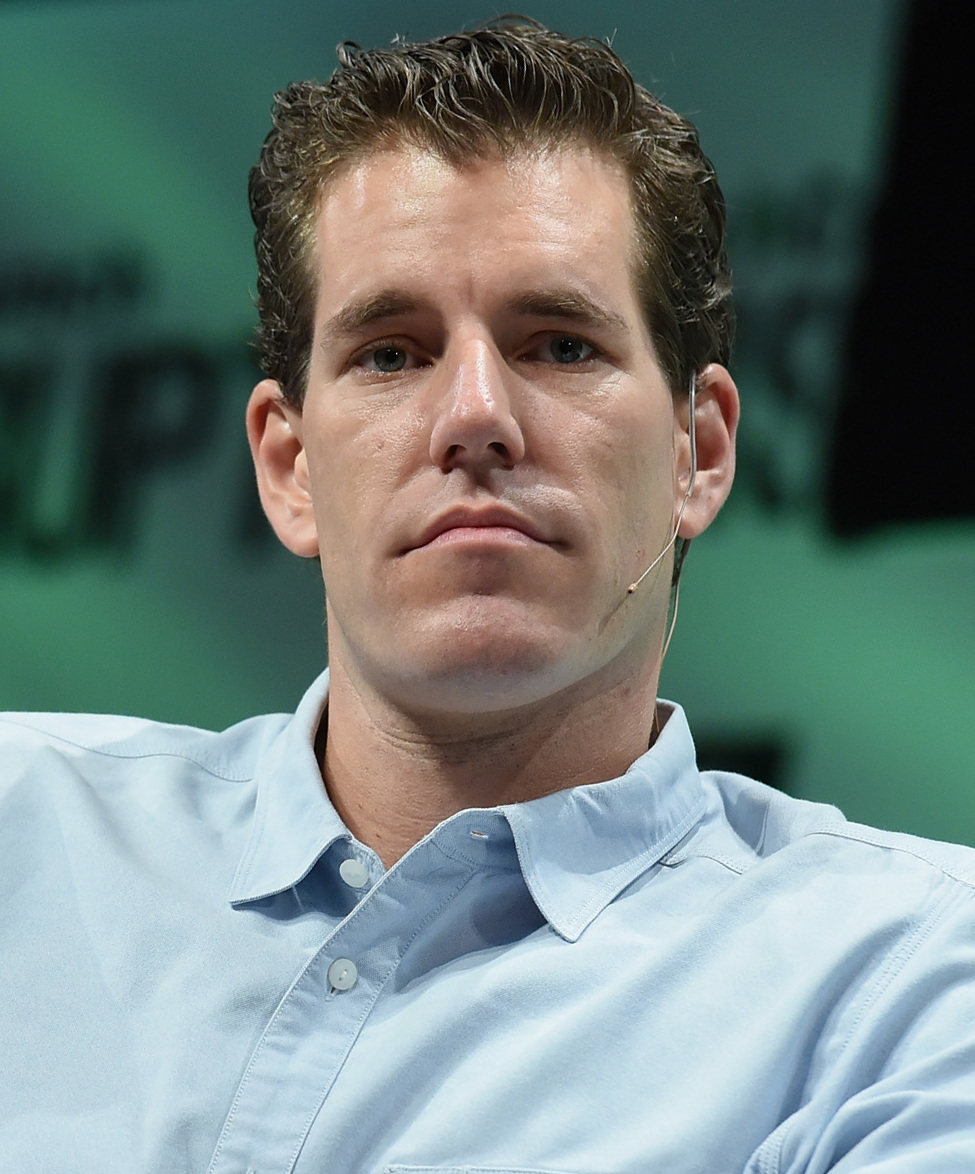
- Winklevoss in 2015

Personal information
- Born: August 21, 1981 (age 45) Southampton, New York, U.S.
- Education: Harvard University (BA); University of Oxford (MBA)
- Height: 6 ft 5 in (196 cm)
- Weight: 220 lb (100 kg)
- Relative: Tyler Winklevoss (brother)

Sport
- Sport: Rowing
- College team: Harvard University; University of Oxford
- Team: United States Olympic Team

Achievements and titles
- Olympic finals: 6th place, Beijing Olympics
Medal record
Men's rowing
Representing the United States
Pan American Games
Gold medal – first place	2007 Rio	Eight
Silver medal – second place	2007 Rio	Coxless four
World Cup
Bronze medal – third place	2009 Lucerne	Coxless four

Cameron Howard Winklevoss (born August 21, 1981) is an American cryptocurrency investor, former Olympic rower, and cofounder of Winklevoss Capital Management and Gemini cryptocurrency exchange. He competed in the men's pair rowing event at the 2008 Summer Olympics with his rowing partner and identical twin brother, Tyler Winklevoss. Winklevoss and his brother are known for co-founding HarvardConnection (later renamed ConnectU) along with Harvard classmate Divya Narendra. In 2004, the Winklevoss twins sued Facebook founder Mark Zuckerberg, claiming he stole their ConnectU idea to create the social networking site Facebook. In addition to ConnectU, Winklevoss also co-founded the social media website Guest of a Guest with Rachelle Hruska.

== Early life and education ==
Cameron Howard Winklevoss was born on August 21, 1981, in Southampton, New York, and raised in Greenwich, Connecticut. He is the son of Carol (née Leonard) and Howard Winklevoss. Howard was an adjunct professor of actuarial science at the Wharton School of the University of Pennsylvania. At an early age, he (left-handed) and his identical "mirror-image" twin brother Tyler (right-handed) demonstrated a pattern of teamwork, building Lego together and playing musical instruments. At the age of 13, they taught themselves HTML and started a web-page company, which developed websites for businesses.

Winklevoss went to the Greenwich Country Day School before attending the Brunswick School for high school. He showed a fondness for the classics in high school, studying Latin and Ancient Greek. During his junior year, he co-founded the crew program with his brother.

On June 14, 2002, Winklevoss's older sister, Amanda, died from cardiac arrest induced by drug overdose.

He enrolled at Harvard University in 2000 for his undergraduate studies where he majored in economics, earning an AB degree and graduating in 2004. At Harvard, he was a member of the men's varsity crew, the Porcellian Club and the Hasty Pudding Club.

In 2009, Winklevoss entered the Saïd Business School at the University of Oxford where he obtained an MBA in 2010. While at Oxford he was an Oxford Blue, and rowed, in a losing effort, in the Blue Boat in the 156th Oxford-Cambridge Boat Race.

== Connect ==
In December 2001, Winklevoss, along with his brother Tyler Winklevoss and fellow Harvard classmate Divya Narendra, sought a better way to connect with fellow students at Harvard University and other universities. The three conceived of a social network for Harvard students named HarvardConnection; the concept ultimately expanded to other schools around the country. What made ConnectU different from other social media platforms was the need to have a specific domain that matched the 'club' you were getting into, like harvard.edu. The idea was to make each school its own club, in which students could connect and be exclusive, similar to the infamous final clubs at Harvard. In January 2003, they enlisted the help of fellow Harvard student, programmer and friend Sanjay Mavinkurve to begin building HarvardConnection. Mavinkurve commenced work on HarvardConnection but departed the project in spring 2003 when he graduated and went to work for Google.

After the departure of Mavinkurve, the Winklevosses and Narendra approached Narendra's friend, Harvard student and programmer Victor Gao, to work on HarvardConnection. Gao, a senior in Mather House, opted not to become a partner in the venture, instead agreeing to be paid in a work for hire capacity. He was paid $400 for his work on the website code during the summer and fall of 2003, when he left the project.

=== Facebook lawsuits ===
In 2004, ConnectU filed a lawsuit against Facebook alleging that creator Mark Zuckerberg had broken an oral contract with them. The suit alleged that Zuckerberg had copied their idea and illegally used source code intended for the website he was hired to create. Facebook countersued in regard to Social Butterfly, a project put out by The Winklevoss Chang Group, an alleged partnership between ConnectU and i2hub, another campus service. It named among the defendants ConnectU, Cameron Winklevoss, Tyler Winklevoss, Divya Narendra, Winston Williams, and Wayne Chang, founder of i2hub. A settlement agreement for both cases was reached in February 2008, reportedly valued at $65 million. However, in May 2010, it was reported that ConnectU accused Facebook of securities fraud on the value of the stock that was part of the settlement and wanted to get the settlement undone. According to ConnectU's allegations, the value of the stock was worth $11 million instead of $45 million that Facebook presented at the time of settlement. This meant the settlement value, at the time, was $31 million, instead of the $65 million. On August 26, 2010, The New York Times reported that Facebook shares were trading at $76 per share in the secondary market, putting the total settlement value at close to $120 million. If the lawsuit to adjust the settlement to match the difference were to go through, the value would quadruple to over $466 million. According to Steven M. Davidoff, "Facebook never represented its valuation in this negotiation, and so there is no prior statement that the company needs to correct." Additionally, Cameron publicly announced that he fully supports Facebook.

After defeat at the appellate court level, the Winklevoss twins decided to petition the Supreme Court of the United States to hear the case, but in June 2011 announced that they had changed their minds.

=== Quinn Emanuel lawsuits ===
One of ConnectU's law firms, Quinn Emanuel, inadvertently disclosed the confidential settlement amount in marketing material by printing "WON $65 million settlement against Facebook". Quinn Emanuel sought $13 million of the settlement as its fee. ConnectU fired Quinn Emanuel and sued the law firm for malpractice. On August 25, 2010, an arbitration panel ruled that Quinn Emanuel "earned its full contingency fee". It also found that Quinn Emanuel committed no malpractice.

=== The Winklevoss Chang Group lawsuit ===
On December 21, 2009, i2hub founder Wayne Chang and The i2hub Organization launched a lawsuit against ConnectU and its founders, seeking 50% of the settlement. The complaint said, "The Winklevosses and Howard Winklevoss filed [a] patent application, U.S. Patent Application No. 20060212395, on or around March 15, 2005, but did not list Chang as a co-inventor." It also stated, "Through this litigation, Chang asserts his ownership interest in The Winklevoss Chang Group and ConnectU, including the settlement proceeds." Lee Gesmer of the firm Gesmer Updegrove posted the 33-page complaint online.

On May 13, 2011, Judge Peter Lauriat ruled against the Winklevosses. Chang's case against them could proceed. The Winklevosses had argued that the court lacked jurisdiction because the settlement with Facebook had not been distributed and therefore Chang had not suffered any injury. Lauriat wrote, "The flaw in this argument is that defendants appear to conflate loss of the settlement proceed with loss of rights. Chang alleges that he has received nothing in return for the substantial benefits he provided to ConnectU, including the value of his work, as well as i2hub's users and goodwill." Lauriat also stated that although Chang's claims to the settlement were "too speculative to confer standing, his claims with respect to an ownership in ConnectU are not. They constitute an injury separate and distinct from his possible share of the settlement proceeds. The court concludes that Chang has pled sufficient facts to confer standing with respect to his claims against the Winklevoss defendants."

== Guest of a Guest ==
In 2008 Cameron co-founded the online site Guest of a Guest, a blog that focuses on parties and nightlife in New York City, Los Angeles, the Hamptons and Washington, D.C., with Rachelle Hruska; she bought out his stake in 2012.

== Gemini ==
In 2014, Cameron and his brother Tyler founded Gemini, a New York-based cryptocurrency exchange.

In January 2022, Gemini began sponsoring Real Bedford F.C., an English non-league football club owned by bitcoin podcaster Peter McCormack; in April 2024 the Winklevoss twins were announced as co-owners of the club following a major investment.

== Rowing ==
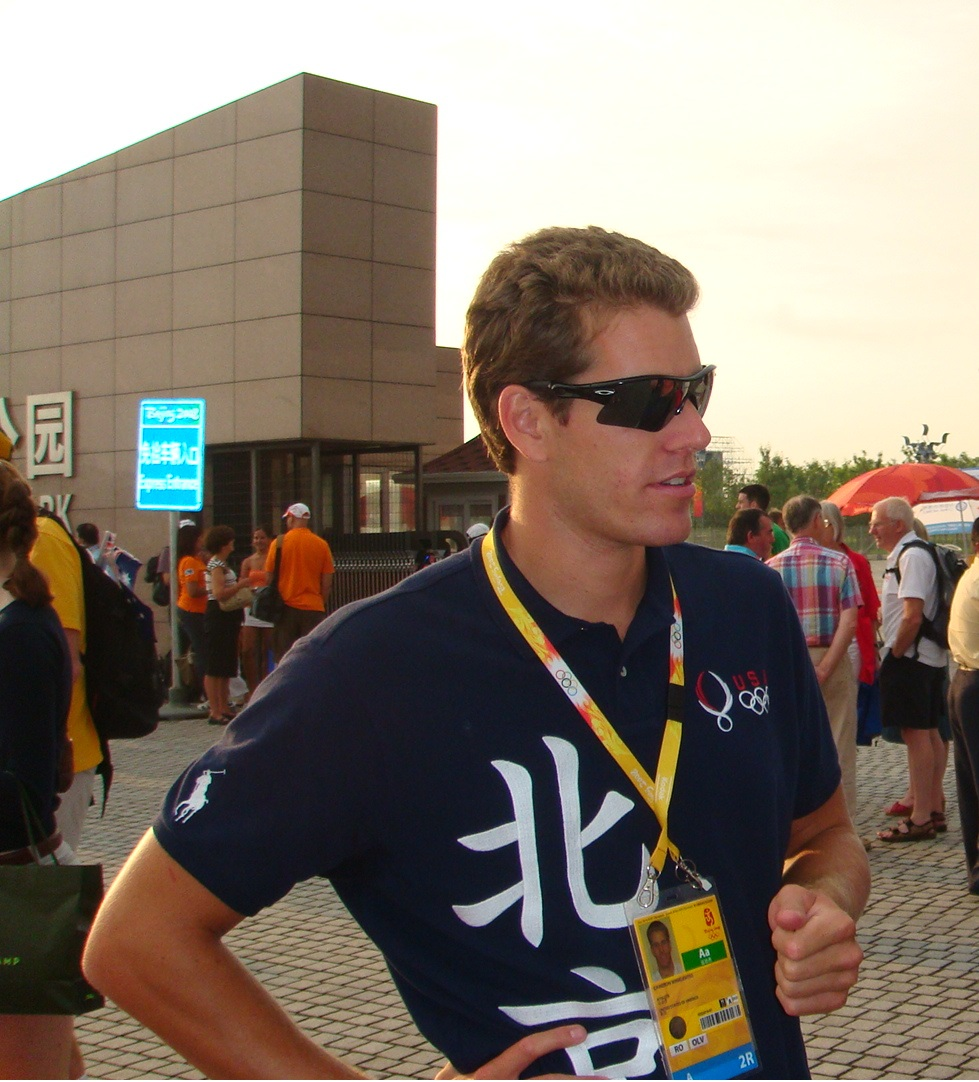
Winklevoss at the 2008 Beijing Olympics

Winklevoss began rowing at the age of 15, encouraged by family friends and the example of next-door neighbor Ethan Ayer who rowed at Harvard University and Cambridge University. Winklevoss began rowing at the Saugatuck Rowing Club on the Saugatuck River in 1997. Winklevoss' high school did not have crew; in his junior year, he and his brother co-founded a crew program. In the summer of 1999, he made the United States Junior National Rowing Team, competing in the coxed pair event with his brother at the World Rowing Junior Championships in Plovdiv, Bulgaria.

Cameron's rowing discipline is sweep rowing.

=== Harvard ===
Winklevoss rowed at Harvard University for four years under coach Harry Parker, while completing his undergraduate studies. In 2004, he sat 6-seat in the "engine room" of the Harvard men's varsity heavyweight eight boat. The 2004 crew was nicknamed the "God Squad" because, according to his brother, some of them believed in God while the rest believed they were God. As a Harvard Crimson in 2004, he helped the "God Squad" win the Eastern Sprints, the Intercollegiate Rowing Association Championship, and the Harvard–Yale Regatta as part of an undefeated collegiate racing season.

In the summer of 2004, Winklevoss and the God Squad traveled to Lucerne, Switzerland, to compete in the Lucerne Rowing World Cup. They defeated the 2004 British and French Olympic eight boats in the semi-final to earn a spot in the grand final, in which they placed 6th. The team then traveled to the Henley Royal Regatta where they competed in the Grand Challenge Cup. Winklevoss helped his team defeat the Cambridge University Blue Boat in the semi-final before they fell to the Dutch Olympic eight boat team (of the Hollandia Roeiclub) in the final by 2/3 of a boat length. The Dutch team went on to win the Olympic silver medal at the Athens Olympic Games a month later.

=== 2007 Pan American Games ===
In 2007, Winklevoss was named to the United States Pan American Team and competed at the 2007 Pan American Games in Rio de Janeiro, Brazil. He won a silver medal in the men's coxless four event and a gold medal in the men's eight event on the Lagoa Rodrigo de Freitas.

=== 2008 Olympic Games ===
In 2008, Winklevoss was named to the United States Olympic Team and competed at the 2008 Olympic Games in Beijing, China. He rowed with his brother in the men's coxless pair event that took place at the Shunyi Olympic Rowing-Canoeing Park. The brothers were coached by Ted Nash. In their first heat, they failed to finish in the top three and did not qualify for the Semifinals. In the Repechage (a last chance to make the Semifinals), they took first, advancing them to the Semifinals. A strong finish in Semifinal 2 put them in the Final. They ended up finishing sixth out of the fourteen countries that had qualified for the Olympics.

=== 2009 World Cup ===
In 2009, Winklevoss won a bronze medal at the Rowing World Cup in Lucerne, Switzerland, in the men's coxless four event.

== Winklevoss Capital Management ==
In 2012, Winklevoss and his brother Tyler founded Winklevoss Capital Management, a firm which invests across multiple asset classes with an emphasis on providing seed funding and infrastructure to early-stage startups. The company is headquartered in New York's Flatiron District.

== Political donations ==
In the first half of 2025, Winklevoss and his brother Tyler each donated around $500,000 to MAGA Inc., a super PAC that supports Donald Trump.

In October 2025, Winklevoss and his brother Tyler were named by the White House as donors to the construction of the White House State Ballroom, a proposed 90,000-square-foot expansion of the East Wing.

== Popular culture ==
Cameron and his brother Tyler are both played by actor Armie Hammer in The Social Network (2010), a film directed by David Fincher about the founding of Facebook. Actor Josh Pence was the body double for Tyler with Hammer's face superimposed.

The twins were depicted on the cartoon comedy show The Simpsons in the eleventh episode of Season 23 in the episode called "The D'oh-cial Network" which aired on January 15, 2012. The Winklevoss twins are seen rowing in the 2012 Olympic Games against Marge Simpson's sisters Patty and Selma. There is a reference made to the $65 million Facebook settlement.

Cameron and Tyler are featured as the main protagonists in the 2019 book Bitcoin Billionaires: A True Story of Genius, Betrayal, and Redemption.

== See also ==
- America PAC
