= Divya Narendra =

American businessman (born 1982)

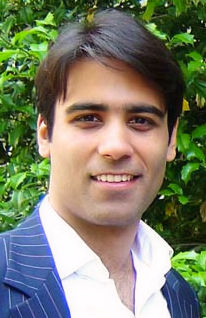
- Narendra in 2011
- Born: March 18, 1982 (age 44); New York City, U.S.
- Education: Harvard University (AB); Northwestern University (JD–MBA)
- Occupation: Businessman
- Known for: ConnectU
- Spouse: Phoebe White

Divya Narendra (/nəˈrɛndrə/; born March 18, 1982) is an American businessman. He is the CEO and co-founder of SumZero along with Harvard classmate Aalap Mahadevia. He also co-founded HarvardConnection (later renamed ConnectU) with Harvard University classmates Cameron Winklevoss and Tyler Winklevoss.

== Early life and education ==
Divya Narendra was born in the Bronx, New York and raised in Bayside, Queens, the eldest son of immigrant doctors from India, Sudhanshu Narendra and Dharamjit Narendra Kumar, of Sands Point, New York. Narendra graduated from Townsend Harris High School in Kew Gardens Hills, Queens before attending Harvard University in 2000, from which he graduated in applied mathematics in 2004.

== SumZero ==
SumZero is an investment community founded by Divya Narendra and Aalap Mahadevia.

== ConnectU ==
ConnectU (originally Harvard Connection) was a social networking website launched on May 21, 2004, that was founded by Harvard students Cameron Winklevoss, Tyler Winklevoss, and Narendra in December 2002. Users could add people as friends, send them messages, and update their personal profiles to notify friends about themselves. In November 2003, the Winklevosses and Narendra approached Mark Zuckerberg about joining the HarvardConnection team. Zuckerberg later founded Facebook, leading to several lawsuits.

On February 6, 2004, the Winklevosses and Narendra first learned of thefacebook.com while reading a press release in the Harvard student newspaper The Harvard Crimson. According to Victor Gao, who looked at the HarvardConnection code afterward, Zuckerberg had left the HarvardConnection code incomplete and non-functional, with a registration that did not connect with the back-end connections. On February 10, 2004, the Winklevosses and Narendra sent Zuckerberg a cease and desist letter. They also asked the Harvard administration to act on what they viewed as a violation of the university’s honor code and student handbook. They lodged a complaint with the Harvard Administrative Board and university president Larry Summers; however, both viewed the matter to be outside the university's jurisdiction. President Summers advised the HarvardConnection team to take their matter to the courts.

== In popular culture ==
Narendra is portrayed by Max Minghella in The Social Network (2010), a film directed by David Fincher about the founding of Facebook. Narendra is of Indian ancestry, while Minghella is of Italian and Chinese ancestry. Narendra said that he was "initially surprised" to see himself portrayed by a non-Indian actor but also said that "Max did a good job in pushing the dialogue forward and creating a sense of urgency in what was a very frustrating period."
