= Winklevoss Capital Management =

American venture capital firm and family office

Winklevoss Capital
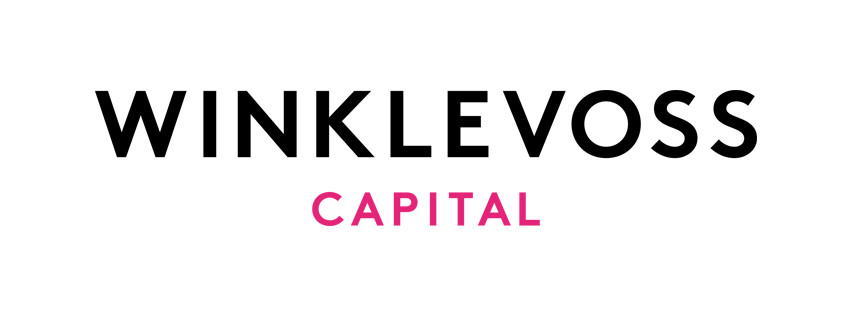
- Type: Private
- Industry: Venture Capital
- Founded: 2012
- Founders: Tyler Winklevoss and Cameron Winklevoss
- Headquarters: Flatiron District, New York City, United States
- Key people: Sterling Witzke, Partner
- Website: winklevosscapital.com

Winklevoss Capital is a family office founded in 2012 by Tyler Winklevoss and Cameron Winklevoss. The firm invests across multiple asset classes including seed funding and infrastructure to early-stage startups. The company is headquartered in New York's Flatiron District.

== Cryptocurrencies ==
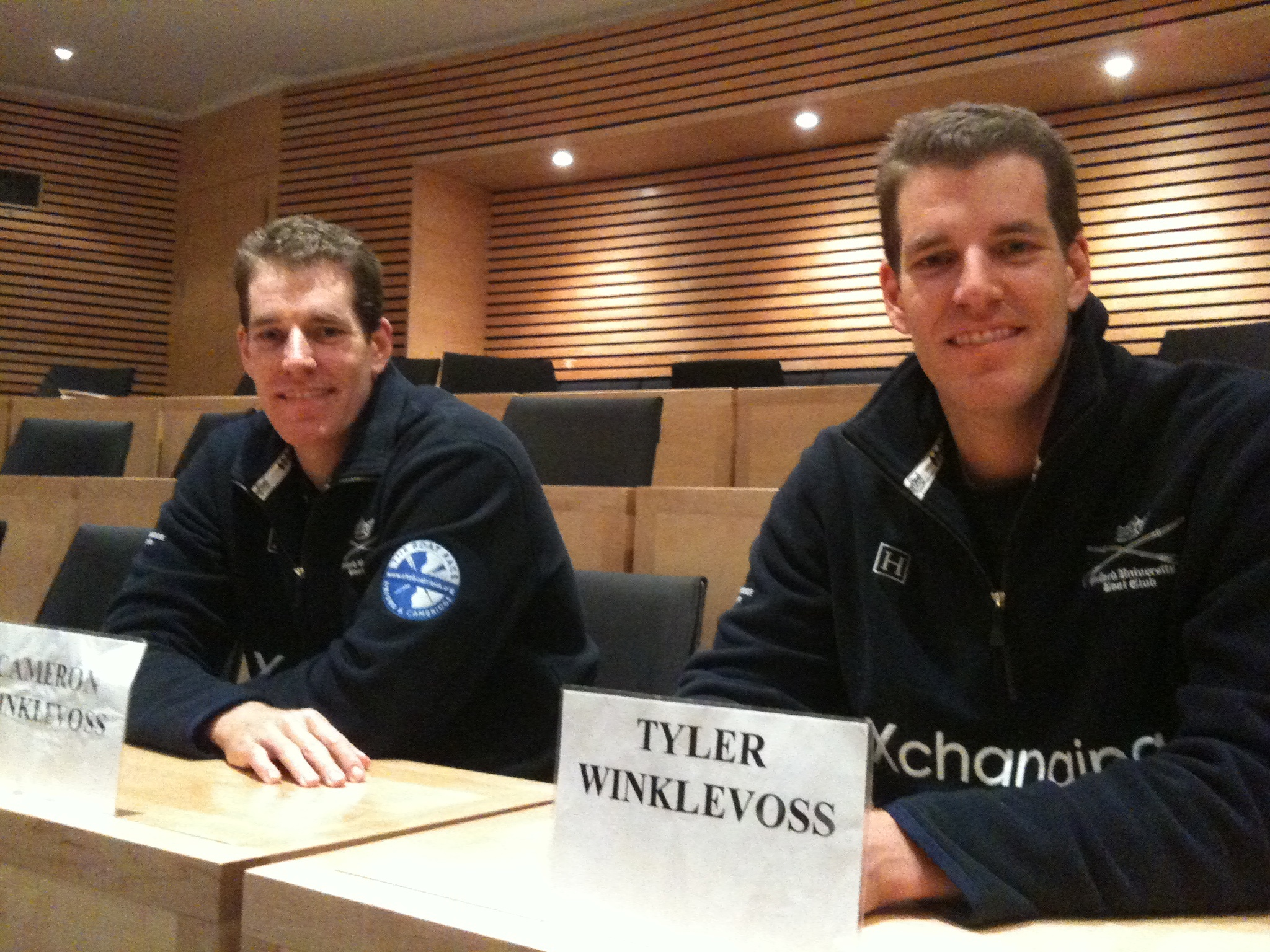
The Winklevoss twins

On April 11, 2013, Tyler Winklevoss and Cameron Winklevoss revealed ownership of approximately 1% of bitcoins in circulation, worth about $11 million, via Winklevoss Capital. The brothers began buying bitcoin when the value of a single coin was in the single digits.

On July 1, 2013, Digital Asset Services, LLC (wholly owned by Winklevoss Capital) filed a Form S-1 with the U.S. Securities and Exchange Commission to create the Winklevoss Bitcoin Trust, an exchange-traded fund for bitcoin.

In 2013, Winklevoss also led a funding round for BitInstant, a Bitcoin exchange start-up based in New York City. Winklevoss Capital, along with other investors, raised $1.5 million in seed funding to help BitInstant increase its staff and scale up its product. Since then, Winklevoss Capital has invested in a number of early-stage equity companies and token networks in the cryptocurrency space.

In 2014, Winklevoss Capital invested in Protocol Labs. The firm also participated in the fundraising for Filecoin in 2017.

== Venture capital activities ==
Winklevoss Capital actively invests in early-stage startups in fintech, direct-to-consumer brands, education, and gaming. The firm's investments include:

- Animoca Brands
- August Locks (alongside Bessemer Venture Partners, Comcast Ventures, and Qualcomm Ventures)
- Carbon38
- Cabify (alongside Rakuten)
- Caviar (acquired by Square, Andreessen Horowitz was also an investor)
- Flexport (alongside Founders Fund, Joe Lonsdale, SoftBank Vision Fund, and First Round Capital)
- FiscalNote (alongside Temasek)
- Kindbody (alongside Chelsea Clinton)
- L.
- Makespace (alongside Carmelo Anthony and Nas)
- MemeBox
- MeUndies
- Minibar
- Octane Security
- Real Bedford FC
- Rowing Blazers
- Shinesty
- Teachable (alongside Naval Ravikant)
- The Sandbox

== Medical cannabis ==
In 2017, Winklevoss was expected to buy up to $500,000 worth of shares in Eaze, a cannabis delivery startup. After the new Eaze CEO was named, Winklevoss backed out of the deal and in May 2016 was sued in Delaware court for reneging on the deal. Winklevoss is also an investor in Eaze and participated in its Series B financing round in 2016.
