= Convenience =

Ease accessibility, save resources, and decrease frustration

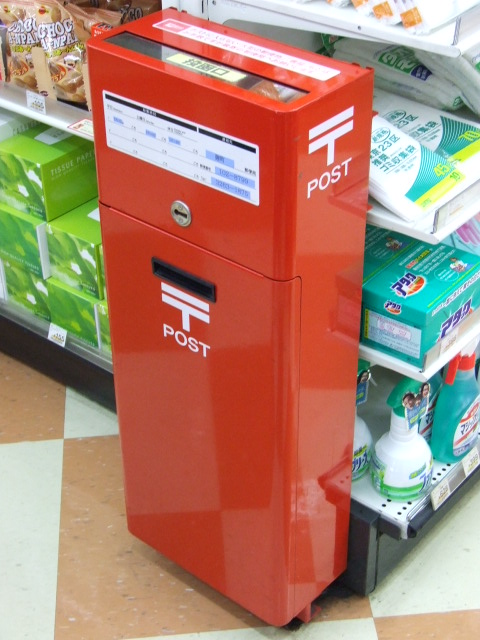
Japan Post Mailbox conveniently located inside a shopping mall

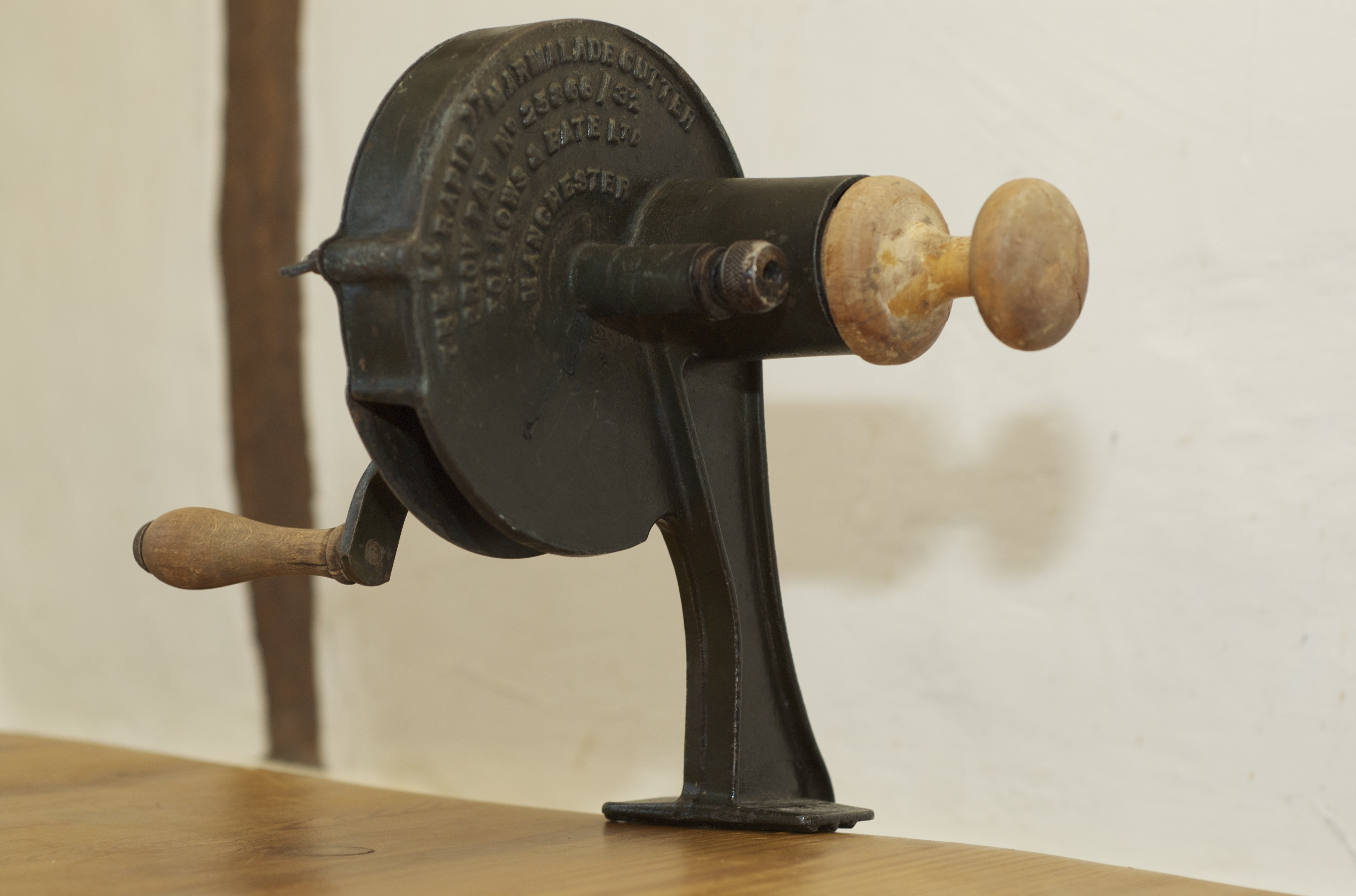
Home appliances such as this Follows & Bate Ltd 'Rapid Marmalade Cutter' increase the convenience of home food preparation

Convenient procedures, products and services are those intended to increase ease in accessibility, save resources (such as time, effort and energy) and decrease frustration. A modern convenience is a labor-saving device, service or substance which make a task easier or more efficient than a traditional method. Convenience is a relative concept, and depends on context. For example, automobiles were once considered a convenience, yet today are regarded as a normal part of life.

Because differences in lifestyles around the world, the term is a relative term based upon the conveniences previously available to a person or group. For instance, an American definition of 'modern convenience' is likely different from that of an individual living in a developing country. Most of the time, the term 'modern convenience' is used to express personal lifestyle and home life.

== Examples ==
Service conveniences are those that save shoppers time or effort, and includes variables such as credit availability and extended store hours. Service convenience pertains to the facilitation of selling both goods and services, and combinations of the two.

Convenience goods are widely distributed products that "require minimal time and physical and mental effort to purchase."

Ready meals and convenience cooking spare the consumer effort in preparation of a meal while providing high levels of energy and pronounced, if mostly artificial, flavour.

Filling stations sell items that have nothing to do with refuelling a motor vehicle, (e.g. milk, newspapers, cigarettes) but purchasing at that location can save the consumer time compared to making a separate journey to a supermarket. Conveniences such as direct deposit can save companies and consumers money, though this may or may not be passed along to the consumer.

Some conveniences can become nuisances when they break down or don't function correctly. It costs time and money to fix items of convenience when they break down, and may cause much greater costs if something else that depends on them cannot take place.

== History ==
=== Early 20th century ===
Household In 1911, architect and author Louis. H. Gibson defined modern conveniences as "those arrangements and appliances which make it possible for people to live comfort ably in a larger house, without seriously increasing the cares which they had in a smaller one". The supposition is that at that time if a family lived in a smaller home, they would have less furniture, appliances and other goods to take care of, and as a result the family's lifestyle and housekeeping would be relatively easy. If, on the other hand, a family moved into a larger home the increase area and furnishings would be much more difficult to manage without labor-saving devices.

Examples of modern conveniences at that time included:

- Kitchen sinks with tap water hot and cold running water and wastewater drainage
- The addition of bathrooms as separate rooms with sinks and toilets, also with waste water and sewage drainage
- A furnace, also identified as a significant cost savings
- Closets in bedrooms, bathrooms, hallway for linen, broom closets
- Gas lighting, stoves and fireplaces, where gas was available
- Icebox or refrigerator

=== 20th century ===
The homes of the 20th century are much bigger than the homes of our family members from the 19th century, both in terms of square footage and number of rooms. Homes built at the beginning of the 21st century have 2–3 times more rooms than homes at the turn of the 20th century. In terms of square footage, new homes built in 2000 are 50% larger than a home built in the 1960s.

The 20th century also enjoyed a proliferation of home appliances like washing machines, dryers, dishwashers, microwave ovens, frost-free refrigerators, water heaters, air conditioning, vacuum cleaners, and irons. Electricity and innovative electronics products including stereo equipment, color television, answering machine, and video cassette recorders also facilitated modern life.

=== 21st century ===
Comparison of modern conveniences in new housing construction

In his 2011 book America's Ticking Bankruptcy Bomb: How the Looming Debt Crisis Threatens the American Dream—and How We Can Turn the Tide Before It's Too Late, Peter Ferrara says that the residential access to modern convenience is markedly different in the 21st century compared to the beginning of the 20th century:

Modern conveniences	1900	1950	2011
Electricity	< 2%	Not stated	Not stated
Running water Flush toilets Vacuum cleaner Gas or electric heat	< 20%	Unknown	80–100%
Dishwasher; Microwave oven Air conditioner	None	< 20%	80–100%
Central air conditioning Decks and Patios; Swimming pools Ceiling fans	Extremely rare	Extremely rare	Prevalent

Upcoming technological advancements David Kirkpatrick, author of The Facebook Effect (2010), wrote in an article called Tech Targets the Third World projects that technological advancements in education and health care, mobile computing and broadband will empower the poor and provide economic opportunities that they would not otherwise have access. These technologies are relatively easy and cost-effective to implement because of technological advancements that have driven down the costs and because developing countries do not have expensive and outdated legacy systems to manage emerging technology.

== Religious groups ==
Religious groups that shun modern conveniences include Anabaptists (and their direct descendants, the Amish, Hutterites, and Mennonites) and Judaism.

=== Anabaptists ===
Key beliefs that determine an Anabaptist community's position on use of modern conveniences are:

- The belief that in order to enter the Kingdom of God, they must live apart from the "world", or the unreformed.
- Avoiding "worldly" behaviors that pull their attention and intentions away from their religious community.

Religion	General position	Electricity	Comments on modern conveniences
Amish	Generally, the Amish avoid use of modern conveniences to limit their contact with the outside world. In recent years, there has been greater openness to strategically select certain modern conveniences to support their businesses, while keeping the spirit of the separateness. Per Donald Kraybill and Steven Nolt: "If it enhances the welfare of the community, new technology is welcomed. Only when it peels away community cohesion does technology face the frown of the church."	Generally, Amish avoid electricity lines coming directly in their homes, but they may use battery, generators, or pneumatic or hydraulic power, such as for machinery and tools.	In most cases the Amish do not have cars, telephone lines coming into their home, or farm equipment that they would ride, all of which increase contact with the outside world or be significant advantages from worldly capabilities. There are exceptions, such as use of voicemail and mobile phones for people who own businesses or are in a progressive order, with guidance provided by their church.
Mennonite	There is wide disparity among the Mennonite, from those most Progressive to the strictest Old Order about the use of modern conveniences. For instance, some Progressive Mennonites live in cities and enjoy many of the modern conveniences of their non-Mennonite neighbors. Each Mennonite community determines its right path, but always with the ideal of living "simply and humbly".	See general comment and Old Order information.	See general comment and Old Order information.
Old order Anabaptists: Hutterites, Mennonites, Amish and Brethren	Although there are some modern conveniences that Old Order members enjoy, they are the most reluctant of the Anabaptists to accept the use of technology, especially direct use. For many of them it is a slippery slope that leads to eternal damnation.	Use of telephone service and electricity lines brought into the home are generally discouraged, decisions are made by the individual religious communities. Like the Amish, they explore creative use of energy, like batteries, generators, etc.	It is difficult to provide one conclusion for four Old Order religions: Each religious community determines the use of modern conveniences based upon their specific circumstances.

=== Orthodox and Conservative Judaism ===
For Orthodox and Conservative Jews, Shabbat is the seventh day of the Jewish week and is a day of rest in Judaism. Shabbat is observed from a few minutes before sunset on Friday evening until a few minutes after the appearance of three stars in the sky on Saturday night. On Shabbat, Jews recall the Genesis creation narrative describing God creating the Heavens and the Earth in six days and resting on the seventh. It also recalls the giving of the Torah at Mount Sinai, when God commanded the Israelite nation to observe the seventh day and keep it holy. Shabbat is considered a festive day, when a Jew is freed from the regular labors of everyday life, can contemplate the spiritual aspects of life, and can spend time with family.

Orthodox and some Conservative authorities rule that there are 39 prohibited activities of work (referred to as "melakhot"), such as turning electric devices on or off, driving cars, and more, during the Shabbat, as listed in Mishnah Tractate Shabbat.

== Consequences ==
There are many ramifications of the development of modern conveniences for individuals and their families over the past 150 or more years. The many labor-saving devices have kept pace with growing houses and furnishings and allow for greater leisure. There are also some negative effects, some of which are also as the result of advancements in chemical technology in the food that we eat or products that we use. In these cases there are also conflicting opinions about the extent to which some of the products are harmful. Here are a few examples of positive and negative effects of modern conveniences.

=== Positive effects ===
==== Health care ====
Some of the major improvements over the past century has been in improved health care. For example, modern medicine has made leaps in preventing infectious diseases in part due to improved water and sewage treatment. This is obvious in the marked rises in life expectancy.

==== Technological advancement in underdeveloped countries ====
Some of the most dramatic technological benefits are seen in underdeveloped countries. For instance, cabling for landline telephone service is expensive and requires a lot of time to complete, especially in the most remote areas. Introduction of cellphone service, on the other hand, is much cheaper and dramatically improves individual's ability to be economically productive, often in microbusinesses. It is estimated that 80% of the world's population is now located within range of cellular towers, 1.5 billion cellular phones are in use in developing countries and, in India alone, five million customers sign up for cellular service each week. The Four Asian Tigers—i.e., Hong Kong, Singapore, Taiwan, and South Korea—are a few of the countries that have leveraged technology to become a presence in the global community.

Another example, led by Nicholas Negroponte of MIT's Media Lab in rural Asia, Latin America and Africa, provides $100 laptop computers to underdeveloped countries.

=== Negative effects ===
In 1905, the Journal of the American Medical Association published an article titled "Nervous Strain" about how "modern conveniences" make our lives busier and with less direct contact than the preceding generations. As an example, the author compared having a calming cup of tea with a person to the more distant practice of placing a telephone call. Labor-saving devices meant that people now spent more time sitting, breathed machine-generated smoke, and ate food, especially meat, fat and sugars, in greater abundance, changing peoples' diets. These activities were speculated to result in high blood pressure, obesity, and "nervous strain".

==== Meat consumption ====
Because of the enormous productivity growth in intensive agriculture and meat industry, meat has become a major part of the diet in most developed countries and is on the rise in developing countries. Red meat consumption has been linked to colon cancer; besides, growth hormone and antibiotics treatment of cattle and poultry has raised serious concerns about the adverse effects of those substances in industrially produced meat.

==== Processed food and food preparation ====
Processed foods, high-fructose corn syrup, and increased fat—the greater reliance on processed, packaged, microwaveable food has resulted in a rise in Type 2 diabetes, obesity, and other health concerns. Margarine, once seen as a great alternative to butter, does not help with absorption of nutrients and may contribute to heart disease.

==== Other ====
Styrofoam cups release styrene as the food or drink is consumed. Leaded fuel is another hazardous chemical. Although it has been outlawed in the United States, its use in developing countries impacts the health of local people and the global environment.

== See also ==
- Amish life in the modern world
- Appropriate technology
- Canadians of convenience
- Consumerism
- Convenience function (computing)
- Convenience store
  - Convenience store crime
- Convenience translation (finance)
- Critique of technology
- Flag of convenience
  - Flag of convenience (business)
- Gamaekjip
- List of convenience stores
- Marriage of convenience
- Modern technology
- Public convenience – term for a public toilet
- Social construction of technology
- Technology
- Technology and society
