= Techonomy Media =

Techonomy Media, Inc.
- Type: Privately held
- Industry: Internet, Media, Conferences
- Founded: New York, United States (2011)
- Founder: David Kirkpatrick
- Headquarters: New York, New York, U.S.
- Key people: David Kirkpatrick (CEO); Simone Ross (EVP, Chief Program Officer); Josh Kampel (President)
- Website: Techonomy Media, Inc.

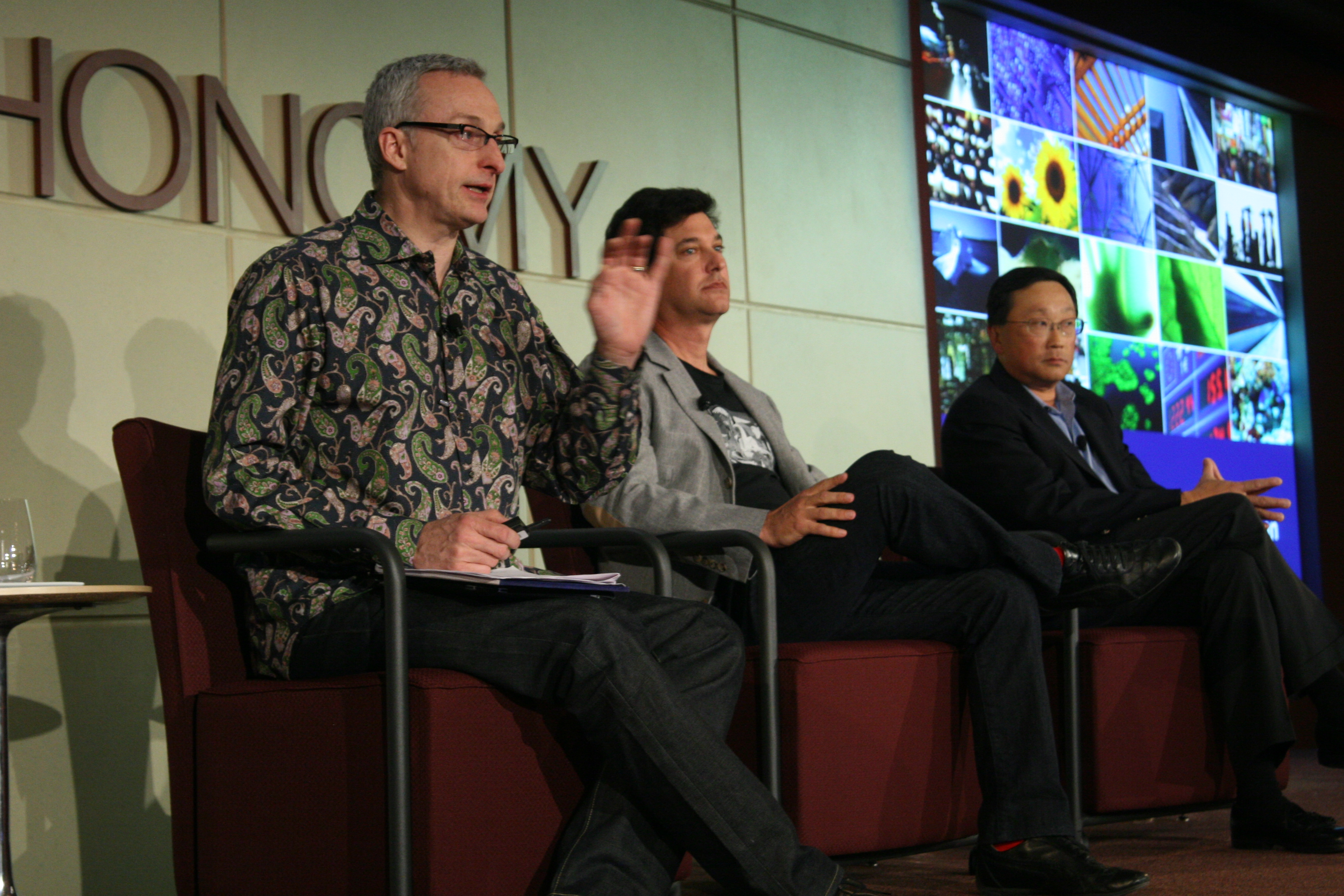
Techonomy 2010

Techonomy Media Inc. is an American conference and media company founded in 2011 and headquartered in New York. Techonomy organizes the annual invitation-only thought leadership Techonomy conference.

== Background ==
Techonomy's name is a portmanteau of the words "technology" and "economy". The company's conferences and publications focus on the relationship between technology, business, and society.

The first Techonomy conference, in 2010, was organized by a partnership that included Kirkpatrick along with former Fortune editors Peter Petre and Brent Schlender, as well as Michael Christman and Carrie Van Heyst. Techonomy Media was created in early 2011 to continue the annual conference and develop editorial content, including video journalism. Simone Ross, former program director for Fortune's conference division, served as program director for the initial Techonomy conference in 2010, and co-founded Techonomy Media as COO and Chief Program Officer for the company. Michael Federle also was a co-founder of the company. Forbes Media, which includes Forbes and Forbes.com, became a minority investor in the company in July 2011.

== Events ==
=== Techonomy Flagship Conferences ===
- 2010: Lake Tahoe in Truckee, California
- 2011: Tucson, Arizona
  - Revolutions in Progress — The growing mismatch between the desires and capabilities of technology-empowered individuals and the habits and practices of the institutions, corporations and governments that serve them.
- 2012: Tucson, Arizona
  - Insurgency and Opportunity: Companies, Countries, and Communities
- 2013: Tucson, Arizona
  - The Business of Revolution
- 2014: Half Moon Bay, California

=== Techonomy Detroit ===
- 2012: Detroit

Participants: Angela Benton, Steve Case, Jack Dorsey, Timothy C. Draper, Justin Fox, Dan Gilbert, Bruce J. Katz, David Kirkpatrick, Vivek Kundra, Josh Linkner, Carlo Ratti, Michael Teitelbaum

- 2013: Detroit
  - Competitiveness, Jobs, and the Urban Future in an Age of Technology — The national challenge of inadequate and inequitable education.

Participants: Jocelyn Benson, Rodney Brooks, Jean Case, Emily Chang, John Wm. Covington, Jack Dorsey, Keith Ferrazzi, Dan Gilbert, Bruce J. Katz, David Kirkpatrick, Josh Linkner, Edward Luce, Larry Morrissey, Marlin Page, Hector Ruiz, Rick Snyder, M. Roy Wilson

- 2014: Detroit

Participants: Jocelyn Benson, Jean Case, Susan P. Crawford, Dickson Despommier, Jack Dorsey, Justin Fox, Dan Gilbert, Andrew Keen, David Kirkpatrick, Josh Linkner, Arun Sundararajan, Philip D. Zelikow

=== Techonomy Lab ===
- 2013: Menlo Park

=== Techonomy Campus ===
- 2013: Tel Aviv

=== Techonomy Bio ===
- 2015: Mountain View, California

Participants: Marc Benioff, Walter De Brouwer, Drew Endy, Juan Enríquez, David Kirkpatrick, Terry Sejnowski

=== Techonomy Policy ===
- 2015: Washington, DC

Participants: Cory Booker, Julie Brill, Steve Case, Vint Cerf, Fadi Chehade, Michael R. Cote, Victoria Espinel, Deb Fischer, Brian Forde, Shane Harris, David Kirkpatrick, Jinyoung Lee Englund, Peter L. Levin, Craig Mundie, Nuala O'Connor, Michael O'Rielly, David O'Sullivan, Sean Parker, Andrew Rasiej, Jessica Rosenworcel, Miriam Sapiro, Arun Sundararajan, Philip D. Zelikow.
