= Hugo Teufel III =

American lawyer

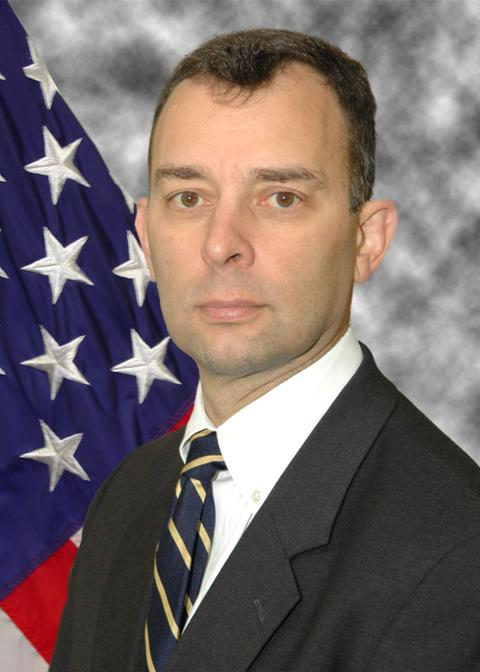

Chief Privacy Officer and Chief Freedom of Information Act (FOIA) Officer of the United States Department of Homeland Security
- In office July 21, 2006 – January 20, 2009
- Preceded by: Nuala O'Connor Kelly
- Succeeded by: Mary Ellen Callahan

Personal details
- Born: July 25, 1961 (age 64) Albuquerque, New Mexico, U.S.
- Party: Republican
- Spouse: Maritza
- Children: 3
- Education: Naval War College (MA); American University (JD); Metropolitan State College of Denver (BA)

Military service
- Branch/service: District of Columbia Army National Guard; United States Army
- Years of service: 2005-2018
- Unit: J.A.G. Corps

Hugo Teufel III (born July 25, 1961) is an American lawyer and former government official.

== Early life and education ==
Teufel was born in 1961 to Hugo Teufel, Jr. and the former Carmen Margarita Trujillo. Teufel's father, Dr. Hugo Teufel, Jr., was born in Philadelphia, Pennsylvania. Hugo Teufel Jr.'s father was a German national who had emigrated to the U.S. in 1923. Teufel Jr.'s mother was a U.S. citizen of German parents. Hugo Teufel Jr.'s first language was German and he grew up in Wichita, Kansas. Teufel Jr. graduated from the University of Kansas and served as an officer in the United States Air Force, stationed at Kirtland Air Force Base, before receiving a master's and a doctorate in mathematics from the University of New Mexico and becoming a mathematics professor at Wichita State University. Teufel Jr. was a chess champion as a teenager.

Teufel's mother grew up in rural northern New Mexico and Spanish was her first language. She is Hispanic. During the 1950s, she studied anthropology at the University of New Mexico and earned a bachelor's degree in that field.

Teufel spent much of his childhood in Wichita, Kansas, but also lived in Santa Fe, New Mexico, before moving to Colorado. He graduated from Denver Lutheran High School in Denver in 1979.

In 1984, Teufel participated in Georgetown University's Summer Program in Trier, Germany. In 1985, he graduated from Metropolitan State College of Denver with a degree in Economics and a minor in German.

In 1990, he graduated from the Washington College of Law at the American University, where he was an editor of The Administrative Law Journal (which has since merged with the American Bar Association's Administrative Law Review).

In 1998–99, while working at the Colorado Attorney General's Office, Teufel received law enforcement training at Arapahoe Community College in Littleton, Colorado, and received a certificate in law enforcement studies. He was P.O.S.T. certified (Peace Officer Standards and Training) in the state of Colorado.

== Employment ==
From 1990 to 1991, Teufel clerked for Chief Judge Loren Smith of the United States Claims Court.

From 1991 to 1996, he was an associate with McKenna & Cuneo, LLP, focusing on government contracts and litigation against the United States.

From 1997-99, Teufel served as deputy Solicitor General for the state of Colorado under Colorado Attorney General Gale Norton.

From 1999 until 2001, he was a special counsel with Hall & Evans, a law firm that focused on public policy and government contracts in the Rocky Mountain region. During this time, he also served as a special assistant attorney general for the State of Colorado, briefing and arguing criminal appeals before the Colorado Court of Appeals and Colorado Supreme Court.

From July 2001 to January 2004, he served as associate solicitor at the U.S. Department of the Interior. He provided legal advice on privacy and FOIA issues, employment and labor issues, government contracts matters, matters involving territories and possessions of the United States, and occasionally on matters involving Native Americans. Teufel and his staff also provided legal advice to management on personnel issues involving the former Chief of the Park Police, Teresa Chambers.

From January 2004 to July 2006, Teufel served as DHS' associate general counsel. He provided legal advice on privacy and FOIA issues, employment and labor issues, government contracts matters, and oversaw the staff of the U.S. Coast Guard's Board for Correction of Military Records. In 2005, Teufel helped Secretary Michael Chertoff with a "Second Stage Review" of the Department.

== DHS Chief Privacy Officer ==
The first person to be DHS' Chief Privacy Officer was Nuala O'Connor Kelly, appointed by Secretary Tom Ridge. After Kelly left, the position was left open for 10 months, during which Maureen C. Cooney was the acting CPO. Teufel was sworn in on July 21, 2006. Teufel also served as the Department's Chief Freedom Of Information Act Officer.

Some questioned Teufel's appointment on the basis of his privacy policy background.

Teufel was one of two DHS principals on the joint US/EU High Level Contact Group on information sharing and privacy and personal data protection. The HLCG, which formed in 2006 and completed its efforts in 2009, was composed of senior officials from the European Commission, the European Council Presidency, and the U.S. Departments of Homeland Security, Justice and State. The HLCG negotiated common principals underlying future information sharing between the U.S. and the European Union to fight terrorism and serious transnational crimes.

Teufel was involved with the Administration's Comprehensive National Cybersecurity Initiative (CNCI), meeting frequently with Congressional staff and reaching out to the privacy community on the Department's efforts with regard to CNCI. Teufel issued a privacy impact assessment of Einstein 2, a computer network intrusion detection system designed for deployment within federal executive agencies for the protection of their information technology. As well, Teufel headed the cyber subcommittee, part of the CIO Council's privacy committee. The subcommittee focuses on the privacy aspects of CNCI.

As part of his office's outreach and education mission, Teufel spoke frequently about the department and privacy at conferences at home and abroad, including the 2008 Iberoamerican Data Protection Network meeting in Cartagena de Indias, Colombia, and the November 2007 EU Conference on Public Security, Privacy and Technology in Brussels.

In June 2008, Teufel received a Master's degree in National Security and Strategic Studies from the Naval War College. Teufel attended the University of Virginia's 16th National Security Law Institute in June 2008.

He left the Department on January 20, 2009, with the change of administrations.

== After DHS ==
In April 2009, Teufel was hired by PricewaterhouseCoopers LLP as a director in the firm's advisory practice. Teufel's focus at PwC was on "helping organizations with issues involving the privacy and security of data, cyber crime and corruption." Matters include privacy compliance, security and identity theft assessment, privacy/security breach investigation and overall risk management strategies.

In November 2014, Teufel was the Senior Counsel for Global Privacy at Raytheon.

In December 2016, he was part of the incoming Trump administration's transition team at DHS.

== Personal ==
Teufel and his wife, Maritza, have three daughters and live in Broomfield, Colorado. Teufel is a member of the Lutheran Church–Missouri Synod.

Teufel has been a member of the American and Colorado Bar Associations. Teufel is a member of the Bars of Colorado and Maryland (inactive); United States Court of Appeals for the D.C. Circuit; United States Court of Appeals for the Federal Circuit; United States Court of Appeals for the Fifth Circuit; United States Court of Appeals for the Tenth Circuit; the United States District Court for the District of Colorado; and the United States Court of Federal Claims. Teufel also holds CIPP/G certification from the International Association of Privacy Professionals.

He is also a member of the Federalist Society and the National Rifle Association of America.

In 2008 and 2009, Teufel served as vice president for the American Society for Access Professionals.

Teufel also serves in the Army National Guard, as an officer in the Judge Advocate General's Corps.

== Publications ==
As Chief Privacy Officer, Teufel frequently contributed to DHS' Leadership Journal.

Other publications include:

- "Privacy and the Future of Cybersecurity", Homeland Defense Journal, December 2008.
- "Disarming Women: Comparing "Gun Control" to Self-Defense as Protection for Victims of Domestic Abuse and Violent Crime", with Richard W. Stevens and Matthew Y. Biscan, a chapter in Liberty for Women, a collection of pieces on individualist feminism published in 2002 by the Independent Institute.
- Two articles on the Columbine High School massacre for Soldier of Fortune Magazine in 2000, one with Harry Humphries. A number of Teufel's instructors from the law enforcement academy were police officers who responded to the situation at Columbine. Both Denver newspapers, the Rocky Mountain News and the Denver Post, referred to Teufel's writing on Columbine favorably.
- Teufel has written occasionally for the Washington Legal Foundation.

== Notes ==
Political offices
Preceded by Nuala O'Connor Kelly	Chief Privacy Officer, Department of Homeland Security; 2006-2009	Succeeded by Mary Ellen Callahan
