= Second Shot at Love =

2025 South Korean television series

- Promotional poster
- Hangul: 금주를 부탁해
- Hanja: 禁酒를 付託해
- Lit.: Please Take Care of Geum-joo
- RR: Geumjureul butakhae
- MR: Kŭmjurŭl put'akhae
- Genre: Romantic comedy
- Written by: Myung Soo-hyun; Jeon Ji-hyun
- Directed by: Chang Yoo-jung
- Starring: Choi Soo-young; Gong Myung
- Country of origin: South Korea
- Original language: Korean
- No. of episodes: 12

Production
- Running time: 60 minutes
- Production company: How Pictures

Original release
- Network: tvN
- Release: May 12 – June 17, 2025

Second Shot at Love (Korean: 금주를 부탁해) is a 2025 South Korean romantic comedy television series written by Myeong Su-hyun and Jeon Ji-hyeon, directed by Chang Yoo-jung, and starring Choi Soo-young and Gong Myung. The series follows the journey of Han Geum-joo and Seo Eui-joon as they navigate their contrasting views on alcohol and a second chance at love. It aired on tvN from May 12, to June 17, 2025, every Monday and Tuesday at 20:50 (KST). It is available for streaming on TVING in South Korea and on Viu and Viki in selected regions.

== Synopsis ==
Han Geum-joo is a skilled car mechanic with ten years of experience. She views herself as a "reasonable drinker" and values interacting with others. Nevertheless, she chooses to stop drinking after being classified as an alcoholic. Her life becomes more complicated when she meets up with her first love, Eui-joon, who left his position as a medical specialist in Seoul to become the director of Bocheon Health Center.

== Cast and characters ==
=== Main ===
- Choi Soo-young as Han Geum-joo

A highly skilled auto mechanic at the headquarters of MFH Automobile Service Center with 10 years of experience.

- Gong Myung as Seo Eui-joon

A psychiatrist and the head of Bocheon Health Center who hates alcohol.

- Kim Sung-ryung as Kim Gwang-ok

Geum-joo and Hyun-joo's mother as well as Jung-soo's wife. She is the only anti-alcoholic in the family and was a bank employee at Bocheon Village Credit Union.

- Kim Sang-ho as Han Jung-soo

Geum-joo and Hyun-joo's father and Gwang-ok's husband who is a heavy drinker and runs a pension in the village.

- Jo Yoon-hee as Han Hyun-joo

Geum-joo's eldest sister, a single mother raising her twin sons and a heavy drinker like her father.

- Kang Hyung-suk as Bong Sun-wook

A taekwondo instructor who runs the Bocheon Taekwondo Center and both Geum-joo and Eui-joon's high school classmate.

=== Supporting ===
==== Bocheon Health Center ====
- Bae Hae-sun as Baek Hye-mi

A nurse at Bocheon Health Center who worked as a head nurse at a university hospital in Seoul.

- Lee Tae-yul as Young-rong

A physical therapist at Bocheon Health Center.

==== Residents of Bocheon Lake Village ====
- Kim Bo-jung as Bong Sun-hwa

Sun-wook's older sister.

- Park Kang-sup as Lee Young-woong

A car center technician who is Sun-hwa's husband and Hwa-young's father.

- Kim Min-chae as Lee Hwa-young

Sun-hwa and Young-woong's daughter.

- Lee Joong-ok as Ki-bum's father who runs a galbi restaurant with his wife and Jung-soo's drinking buddy
- Kim Hyun-sook as Ki-bum's mother who runs a galbi restaurant with her husband and a representative of gossips in the village
- Son Sang-gyu as Young-woong's father who runs Young-woong Super Gamaekjip with his wife
- Joo In-young as Young-woong's mother who runs Young-woong Super Gamaekjip with her husband

==== Others ====
- Kim Tae-oh as Kim Sa-bum

An employee at Bocheon Taekwondo Center.

- Yeom Seung-yi as Choi Mi-yeon

Geum-joo's co-worker and best friend.

- Yoo Eui-tae as Kim Joo-yeop

Geum-joo's ex-boyfriend.

== Production ==
=== Development ===
The series was developed under the working title Extremely Senseful Alcoholic (Korean: 지극히 상식적인 알코올 중독자; RR: Jigeukhi sangsikjeogin alkool jungdokja). It is written by Myung Soo-hyun, who wrote Ugly Miss Young-ae series (2008–2015), Drinking Solo (2016), A Poem a Day (2018), and Monthly Magazine Home (2021) and Jeon Ji-hyun, and directed by Chang You-jeong, who directed the film series Honest Candidate and Honest Candidate 2. Planned by Studio Dragon and produced by How Pictures.

=== Casting ===
In August 2024, Choi Soo-young and Gong Myung were reportedly cast as the leads for the series. Jo Yoon-hee was reportedly cast the following month. In November 2024, Kim Sung-ryung said in an interview that she currently filming the series at that time. The next month, Kim Hyun-sook joined the cast in a supporting role.

In February 2025, Choi, Gong, Jo, and Kim – together with Kim Sang-ho – were officially confirmed to cast.

== Release ==
In December 2024, TVN announced Second Shot at Love as part of its 2025 drama line-up. In January 2025, the series was scheduled to broadcast in May. It was confirmed to premiere on May 12, 2025, and will air every Monday and Tuesday at 20:50 (KST). It will also be available for streaming on TVING in South Korea and on Viki in selected regions.

== Viewership ==
Second Shot at Love : South Korea viewers per episode (thousands)

Season	Episode number												Average
Season	1	2	3	4	5	6	7	8	9	10	11	12	Average
1	808	693	747	767	715	663	655	663	676	603	684	793	706

Source: Audience measurement performed nationwide by Nielsen Korea.

Average TV viewership ratings
Ep.	Original broadcast date	Average audience share (Nielsen Korea)	
Ep.	Original broadcast date	Nationwide	Seoul
1	May 12, 2025	3.351% (1st)	4.345% (1st)
2	May 13, 2025	2.982% (1st)	2.990% (1st)
3	May 19, 2025	3.181% (1st)	3.683% (1st)
4	May 20, 2025	3.682% (1st)	3.818% (1st)
5	May 26, 2025	3.191% (2nd)	3.918% (1st)
6	May 27, 2025	2.823% (2nd)	3.175% (1st)
7	June 2, 2025	3.063% (1st)	3.110% (1st)
8	June 3, 2025	2.697% (2nd)	2.352% (2nd)
9	June 9, 2025	3.117% (1st)	2.970% (1st)
10	June 10, 2025	3.008% (2nd)	3.110% (2nd)
11	June 16, 2025	3.088% (1st)	3.143% (1st)
12	June 17, 2025	3.618% (1st)	3.674% (1st)
Average		3.150%	3.357%
In the table above, the blue numbers represent the lowest ratings and the red numbers represent the highest ratings.; This drama aired on a cable channel/pay TV which normally has a relatively smaller audience compared to free-to-air TV/public broadcasters (KBS, SBS, MBC, and EBS).
