= Nuala O'Connor (technologist) =

American technologist (born 1968)

Chief Privacy Officer of the Department of Homeland Security
- In office 2003 – 2005
- Preceded by: First in Office
- Succeeded by: Hugo Teufel III

Personal details
- Born: Belfast, Northern Ireland
- Education: Princeton University, Harvard University, Georgetown Law Center
- Occupation: President and CEO of the Center for Democracy and Technology

Nuala O'Connor is Senior Vice President and Chief Counsel for Digital Citizenship for Walmart. From 2014 to 2019, O’Connor served as the president and CEO of the Center for Democracy and Technology (CDT). O'Connor is an expert on digital human rights and civil liberties, technology policy, privacy, and information governance. From 2003–2005, O'Connor served as the first Chief Privacy Officer for the US Department of Homeland Security.

== Early life and education ==
Nuala O'Connor was born in Belfast, Northern Ireland in 1968 and grew up in New York City. In 1985, O'Connor attended Princeton University, where she was a member of the Princeton Tigerlilies, Princeton Triangle Club, and Cloister Inn. O'Connor graduated from Princeton University in 1989 with an AB in American Studies and English. O'Connor has also earned an M.Ed in Administration, Planning & Social Policy from Harvard University and a J.D. from Georgetown University Law Center.

== Career ==
Civil and digital rights advocacy groups such as the Electronic Privacy Information Center and the ACLU praised O'Connor for protecting American's privacy rights as the first Chief Privacy Officer for the US Department of Homeland Security, a position in which she was responsible for evaluating the department for privacy impacts and "mak[ing] sure that privacy is considered and is codified". In the public sector, O'Connor has experience working on global technology policy for the US Department of Commerce as its Deputy Director of the Office of Policy & Strategic Planning, Chief Privacy Officer, and Chief Counsel for Technology.

O'Connor has held numerous positions in the private sector. At Amazon.com, O'Connor worked as the Vice President of Compliance & Customer Trust and Associate General Counsel for Privacy & Data Protection. At General Electric, O'Connor served as the Global Privacy Leader and was responsible for privacy policy and practices. O'Connor has also worked as legal counsel to DoubleClick, managing class actions and settlements.

CDT's former president and CEO, Leslie Harris, said of O'Connor, "Nuala is a brilliant choice to lead CDT. She is a passionate advocate for civil liberties, highly expert about the emerging global challenges and fully committed to CDT's mission. She is a bold leader who will guide CDT into its next chapter. I have had the honor of working with CDT's talented and thoughtful team for almost nine years. I am confident that they will thrive with Nuala at the helm."

== Awards and recognition ==
O'Connor is a recipient of numerous awards, including the 2005 IAPP Vanguard Award, the 2010 Executive Women's Forum's Woman of Influence award, and was named to the Federal 100. O'Connor has also been named "Geek of the Week" by the Minority Media & Telecom Council. She has served on numerous boards and advisory committees, including the Walmart President’s Inclusion Council; WALPAC; the Knight Commission on Trust, Media & Democracy; the Center for Democracy & Technology; the Data Quality Campaign, and the National Cyber Security Alliance/StaySafeOnline.

== See also ==
- Center for Democracy and Technology
