= Self service technologies =

Technological interfaces

Self-service technologies (SSTs) are technological interfaces allowing customers to produce services independent of involvement of direct service employee. Self service technologies are replacing many face-to-face service interactions with the intention to make service transactions more accurate, convenient and faster.

== Examples of SSTs ==
Automated teller machines (ATMs), self-pumping at gas stations, self-ticket purchasing on the Internet and self-check-out at hotels and libraries are typical examples of self service technologies. As users of self service technologies continue to become more accepting, additional solutions for making service transactions more convenient and faster will be developed.
