= Naval War College =

US staff college in Newport, Rhode Island

- Seal of the Naval War College
- Motto: Viribus mari victoria
- Motto in English: Victory by seapower
- Type: Federal staff college
- Established: 1884; 142 years ago
- Parent institution: Naval University System
- Location: Newport, Rhode Island, U.S.
- President: Darryl L. Walker
- Mascot: The Kraken
- Website: www.usnwc.edu
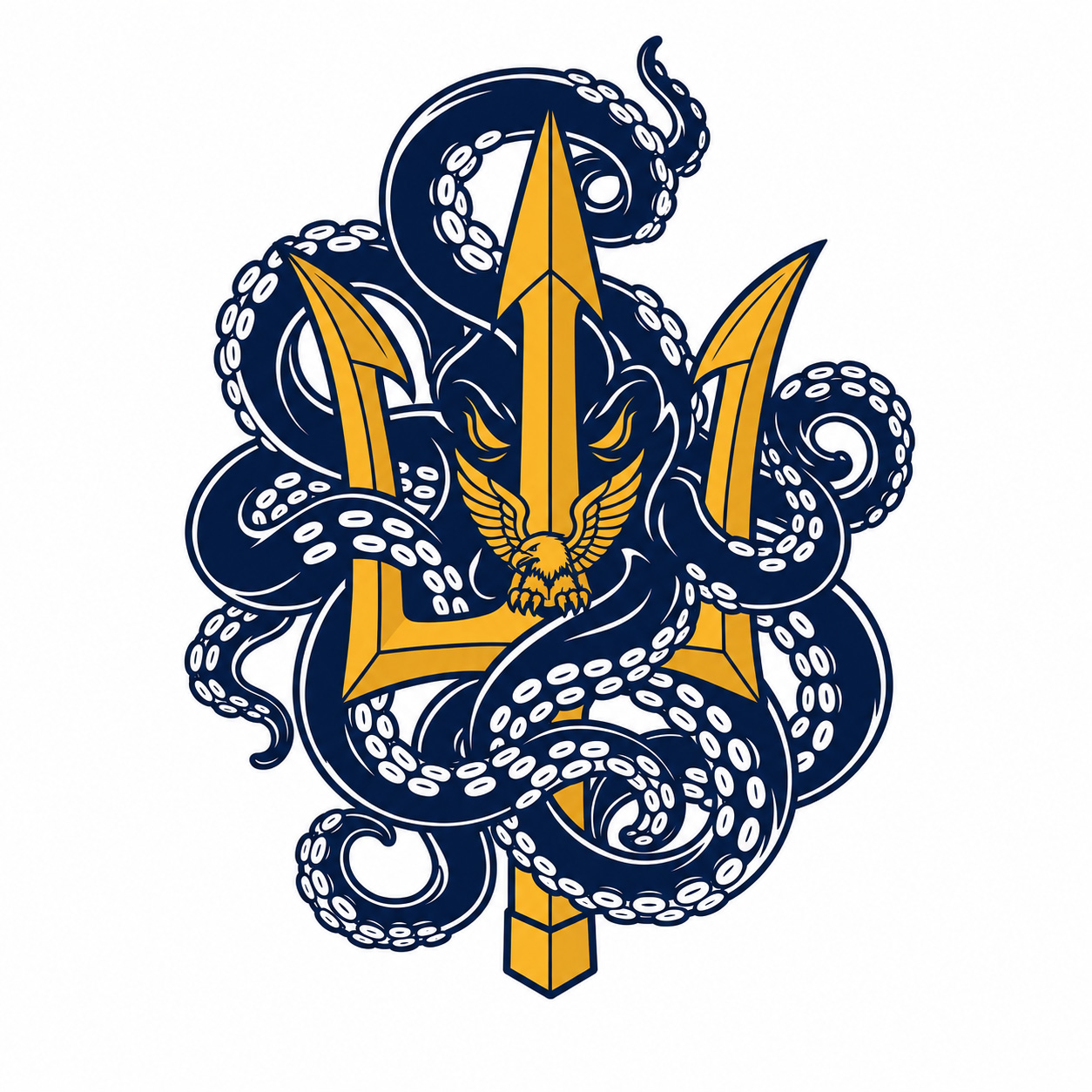
- U.S. Naval War College
- U.S. National Register of Historic Places
- U.S. National Historic Landmark District
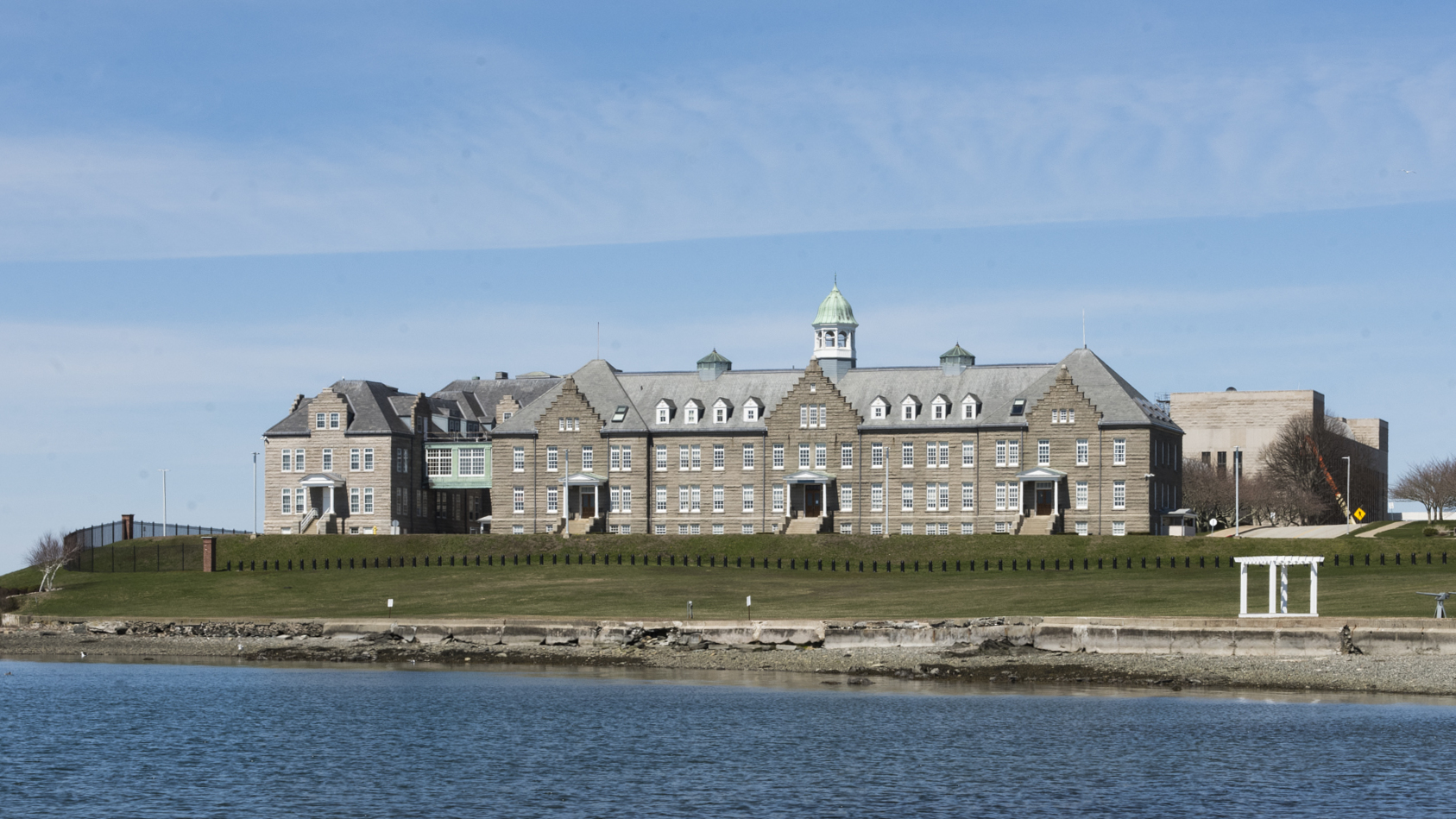
- Luce Hall

- Location within Rhode Island Location within the United States
- Location: Newport, Rhode Island
- Coordinates: 41°30′28″N 71°19′46″W
- Area: 4 acres (1.6 ha)
- Architect: George C. Mason & Son
- NRHP reference No.: 66000876

Significant dates
- Added to NRHP: October 15, 1966
- Designated NHLD: January 29, 1964

The Naval War College (NWC or NAVWARCOL) is the staff college and "Home of Thought" for the United States Navy at Naval Station Newport in Newport, Rhode Island. The NWC educates and develops leaders, supports defining the future Navy and associated roles and missions, supports combat readiness, and strengthens global maritime partnerships.

The Naval War College is one of the senior service colleges including the Army War College, the Marine Corps War College, and the USAF Air War College. Additionally, the U.S. Department of Defense operates the National War College.

== History ==
The college was established on October 6, 1884. Its president Commodore Stephen B. Luce was given the building that formerly housed the Newport Asylum for the Poor on Coasters Harbor Island in Narragansett Bay. Among the first four faculty members were Tasker H. Bliss, a future Army Chief of Staff; James R. Soley, the first civilian faculty member and a future assistant secretary of the Navy; and Captain Alfred Thayer Mahan, who became renowned for the scope of his strategic thinking and influence on naval leaders worldwide.

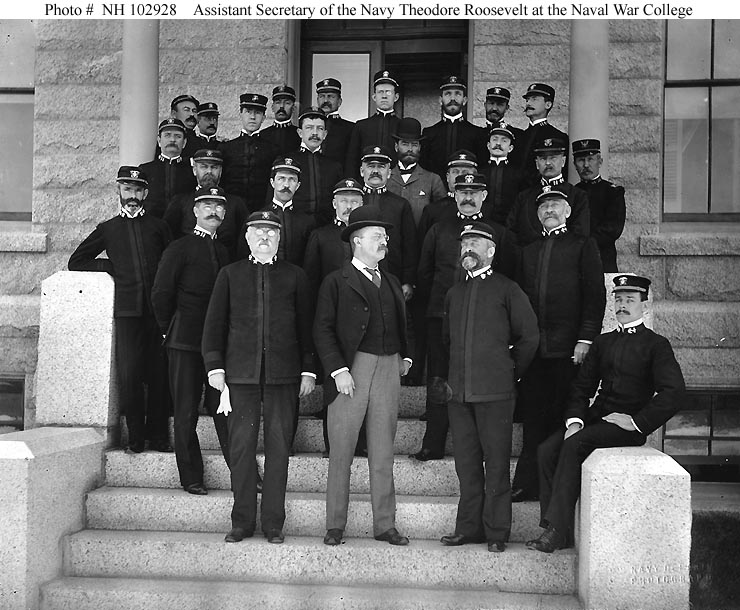
Assistant Secretary of the Navy Theodore Roosevelt on the steps of the Naval War College with faculty and students

The College engaged in wargaming various scenarios beginning in 1887, and it became a laboratory for the development of war plans. Nearly all of the U.S. naval operations of the twentieth century were originally designed and gamed at the NWC.

From its initial class of nine students in 1885, the college has grown to produce over 50,000 graduates. Its alumni network currently includes about 300 active-duty admirals, generals, and Senior Executive Service leaders. The institution's Joint Professional Military Education (JPME) programs focus on preparing these professionals for strategic and operational leadership, sharpening their skills as effective decision-makers and problem solvers.

== Academic programs ==
=== College of Naval Command and Staff ===
The College of Naval Command and Staff (CNCS) is a multidisciplinary program designed for U.S. Navy and U.S. Coast Guard officers in the grade of lieutenant commander, U.S. Marine Corps, U.S. Army, and U.S. Air Force officers in the grade of major, and civilians of equivalent seniority from various federal agencies. This intermediate level service college course provides an initial opportunity for joint professional military education wherein students prepare for increased responsibilities as commanders / lieutenant colonels, and as junior captains / colonels.

College of Naval Command and Staff students pursue studies in each of the Naval War College's three core subject areas in the following order of presentation: Strategy and War, Theater Security Decision Making, and Joint Maritime Operations. While this basic curriculum is essentially the same as that of the more senior students enrolled in the College of Naval Warfare, individual courses are tailored to the experience level and career needs of the CNCS's mid-grade officers. Each student in the College of Naval Command and Staff is also required to enroll in one Elective Program course of his or her choice per trimester. A limited number of students may, with selection committee approval, forego up to one trimester of the core curriculum to participate in the Center for Naval Warfare Studies' Advanced Research Program.

Beginning in 1914, NWC imparts its competent, executive-level programs beyond campus through its, now web-based, College of Distance Education (CDE). The three main CDE courses are Strategy and War, Theater Security Decision Making, and Joint Maritime Operations.

=== Maritime Advanced Warfighting School (MAWS) ===
Originally established in 1998 as the Naval Operational Planner Course, the Maritime Advanced Warfighting School (MAWS) is a 13-month program that educates U.S. officers of all services to:

- Be operational planners and ultimately, operational leaders
- Understand and apply maritime power effectively
- Form and lead Operational Planning Teams (OPTs)
- Think creatively and critically by developing solutions to complex, chaotic security problems

MAWS integrates the College of Naval Command and Staff core curriculum with specialized education and hands-on, real-world projects in the operational planning domain. MAWS is the U.S. Navy's peer school to the U.S. Army's School of Advanced Military Studies (SAMS), the U.S. Marine Corps' School of Advanced Warfighting (SAW), the U.S. Air Force's School of Advanced Air and Space Studies (SAASS), and the Joint Forces Staff College's Joint Advanced Warfighting School (JAWS).

=== National Security Affairs Department ===
The National Security Affairs Department (NSA) curricula provide military officers and federal government civilians a foundation in contemporary security studies to analyze how the U.S. government makes foreign policy decisions and the role the U.S. plays in the world. This includes: the ability to develop and communicate analyses of current and emerging security issues facing the U.S. and its international partners and allies, the understanding of U.S. decision making dynamics at the strategic level, and the ability to assess political, budgetary, bureaucratic, organizational, and leadership factors influencing decision making and implementation of U.S. foreign policy and strategy development. In support of the Naval Command and Staff College, it teaches Theater Security Decision Making and in support of the College of Naval Warfare, it teaches National Security Decision Making.

=== College of Naval Warfare ===
The College of Naval Warfare is a multidisciplinary program designed for U.S. Navy and U.S. Coast Guard officers in the grades of commander or captain, U.S. Marine Corps, U.S. Army and U.S. Air Force officers in the grades of lieutenant colonel or colonel, and civilians of equivalent seniority from various federal agencies. This senior level professional military education program provides students with executive-level preparation for higher responsibilities as senior captains / colonels and as junior flag officers / general officers.

College of Naval Warfare students pursue studies in each of the Naval War College's three core subject areas in the following order of presentation: Joint Military Operations, Strategy and Policy, and National Security Decision Making. During all trimesters, College of Naval Warfare students are joined in lectures and in seminars by international students of the Naval Command College. Each College of Naval Warfare student is also required to enroll in one Elective Program course of his or her choice per trimester. A limited number of students in each class may, with selection committee approval, forego up to one trimester of the core curriculum to participate in the Center for Naval Warfare Studies' Advanced Research Program.

== Accreditation and degrees ==
The Naval War College is accredited by the New England Commission of Higher Education (NECHE). It was accredited by the New England Association of Schools and Colleges from 1984 until 2018, when the Association's university accreditation body split off and became NECHE. In 1990 the Naval War College earned the authority to award to students in some of its programs a Master of Arts in National Security and Strategic Studies. Naval War College students are also permitted to transfer up to 18 credits to the Graduate Program in International Relations at Salve Regina University. The arrangement allows Naval War College students to complete a Master of Arts degree in International Relations from Salve Regina University by taking six additional courses.

== Publications ==
The Naval War College Press has published the scholarly quarterly journal the Naval War College Review since 1948. It also publishes the "Newport Papers", as well as an historical monograph series and occasional books.

== Research and instruction ==
The Henry E. Eccles Library, housed in Hewitt Hall, supports the Naval War College's mission by providing information literacy training, reference tutorials and assistance, electronic literature searches, and access to over 90 databases, and interlibrary loan services to Professional Military Education/Joint Professional Military Education, faculty research and analysis, and College of Distance Education.

The library also aids curricula development by assisting faculty research, publishing bibliographies and research guides covering a wide range of topics of interest for those studying international relations, foreign area studies, contemporary and historical military topics, and security studies.

The Naval Historical Collection (NHC) is the depository for the Naval War College archives, manuscripts, oral histories, and special collections relating to the history of naval warfare and the history of the U.S. Navy in Narragansett Bay. Established in 1969 and located in Mahan Hall, the NHC's primary source material are of interest to naval historians, scholars, and students of American military and diplomatic history, Naval War College students, faculty and staff, and the general public.

== Buildings and structures ==
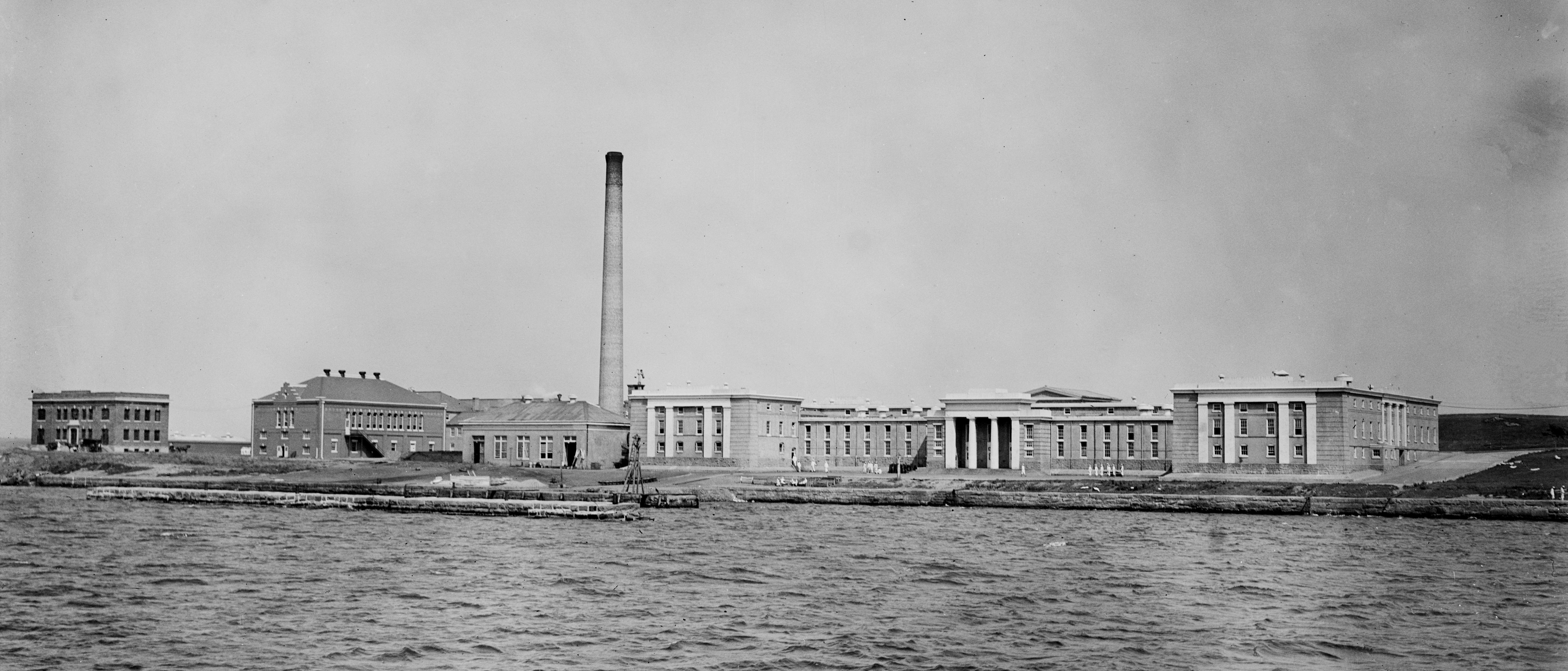
Photo of the early Naval War College from the east passage of Narragansett Bay

Over the years, the Naval War College has expanded greatly. The original building, the former Newport Asylum for the Poor, now serves as home to the Naval War College Museum. In 1892, Luce Hall was opened as the college's new home, at a cost of $100,000. At the time, the building housed lecture rooms and a library. Wings at either end provided two sets of quarters, occupied by the president of the College and members of the faculty. When the Naval War College was enlarged in 1932, this original building was renamed Luce Hall in honor of the institution's founder and first Superintendent (later President), Stephen B. Luce. This original pair of buildings was designated a National Historic Landmark in 1964, and listed on the National Register of Historic Places. Luce Hall was again listed on the National Register in 1972.

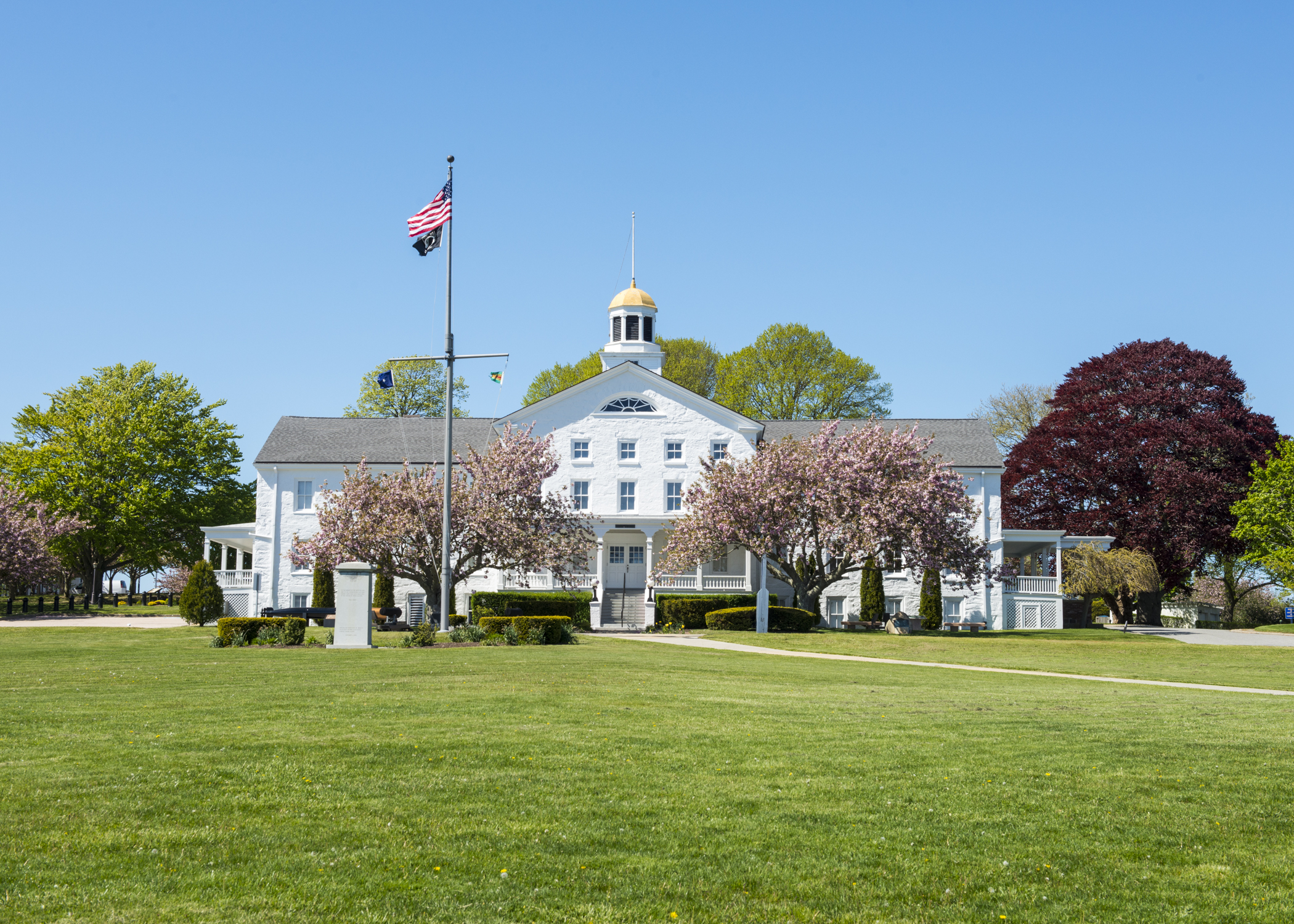
Founder's Hall, now the Naval War College Museum

Mahan Hall, named after Rear Admiral Alfred Thayer Mahan (NWC President from 1886–1889 and 1892–1893), was completed and opened in 1904, and encompasses the historic Mahan Rotunda and Reading Room, as well as student study areas. The Mahan Rotunda also serves as an impromptu museum of gifts and artifacts donated by graduating international students over the years.

Pringle Hall (named after Vice Admiral Joel R. P. Pringle, Naval War College President from 1927–1930) was opened in 1934, and was the principal site for war gaming from the time of its completion in 1934 until the Naval Electronic Warfare Simulator was built in Sims Hall in 1957. The exterior facing of the building is pink Milford granite, similar in appearance to the ashlar granite of Luce Hall, to which it is connected by two enclosed bridges. Pringle Hall contains a 432-seat auditorium, the Quinn Lecture Room, the Naval Staff College, the Graphic Arts Studio, the Photography Branch, and the Naval War College Press.

In 1947, the Naval War College acquired an existing barracks building and converted it to a secondary war gaming facility, naming it Sims Hall after former War College President Admiral William Sowden Sims (Naval War College President from February to April 1917 and again from 1919–1922). In 1957 Sims Hall became the primary center for the Naval War College's wargaming department, serving as such until 1999. Sims Hall is undergoing renovations that are expected to be completed in 2021.

The 1970s saw the War College's most active expansion, with the opening of three separate buildings. In 1972, Spruance Hall, named after former NWC President Admiral Raymond A. Spruance (March 1946 – July 1948), was completed, housing faculty offices and an 1,100 seat auditorium.

Spruance Hall subsequently became the primary venue for major lectures and cultural events on the Naval War College campus. On one notable occasion, St. Patrick's Day, March 17, 1975, Johnny Cash with The Tennessee Three along with June Carter Cash and Carl Lee Perkins performed a live concert at Spruance Auditorium. Before taking the stage, Cash also warmed up with June and Perkins under the historic rotunda in Mahan Hall. The recording of this "lost concert" of Johnny Cash show was donated by Captain Roy Cash, Jr., who later collaborated with Naval War College historian, David Kohnen, to write the account of the lost concert, which had previously remained undocumented in the official chronology of performances by Johnny Cash.

That same year, in 1974, Admiral Julien LeBourgeois organized a series of initiatives, which focused upon the cultural influence of the Naval War College upon civil-military policy. In conjunction with those efforts, LeBourgeois hosted several symposia to highlight the interrelationships between the American public and the future role of the navy in securing global peace. His efforts coincided with broader expansions in the Naval War College mission during the closing phases of operations in the Vietnam War.

At that time, Conolly Hall was opened and named in honor of Admiral Richard L. Conolly, Naval War College President 1950–1953. It houses the NWC Quarterdeck, Administrative and faculty offices, numerous class and conference rooms, and two underground parking garages.

1976 saw the opening of Hewitt Hall, one of two Naval War College buildings not named after a War College president, this time taking its name from Admiral Henry Kent Hewitt, an advisor to the Naval War College during his tenure as Commander, U.S. Naval Forces Europe, following World War II. Hewitt Hall is home to the Henry E. Eccles Library, the Trident Café, the bookstore and barbershop, and student study areas and lounge.

In 1999, the state-of-the-art McCarty Little Hall opened, replacing Sims Hall as the War College's primary wargaming facility. The other building named after a non-president is named after Captain William McCarty Little, an influential leader and key figure in refining the techniques of war gaming. This high-tech facility is used primarily by the Center for Naval Warfare Studies to conduct war games and major conferences, and for research and analysis. The building features the technology necessary to support a variety of multi-media needs essential during multiple and simultaneous war games.

== Partnership with Brown University ==
On June 6, 2014, NWC and Brown University's Watson Institute for International Studies signed a Research and Education Memorandum of Agreement (MOA) between the two institutions. The agreement promotes collaborative research and teaching between NWC and Brown, serves as an opportunity to establish and conduct programs to improve education in science-related fields to meet long-term national defense needs, and establishes cooperative education programs for undergraduate education at Brown and postgraduate education at both Brown and NWC.

== Notable U.S. graduates ==
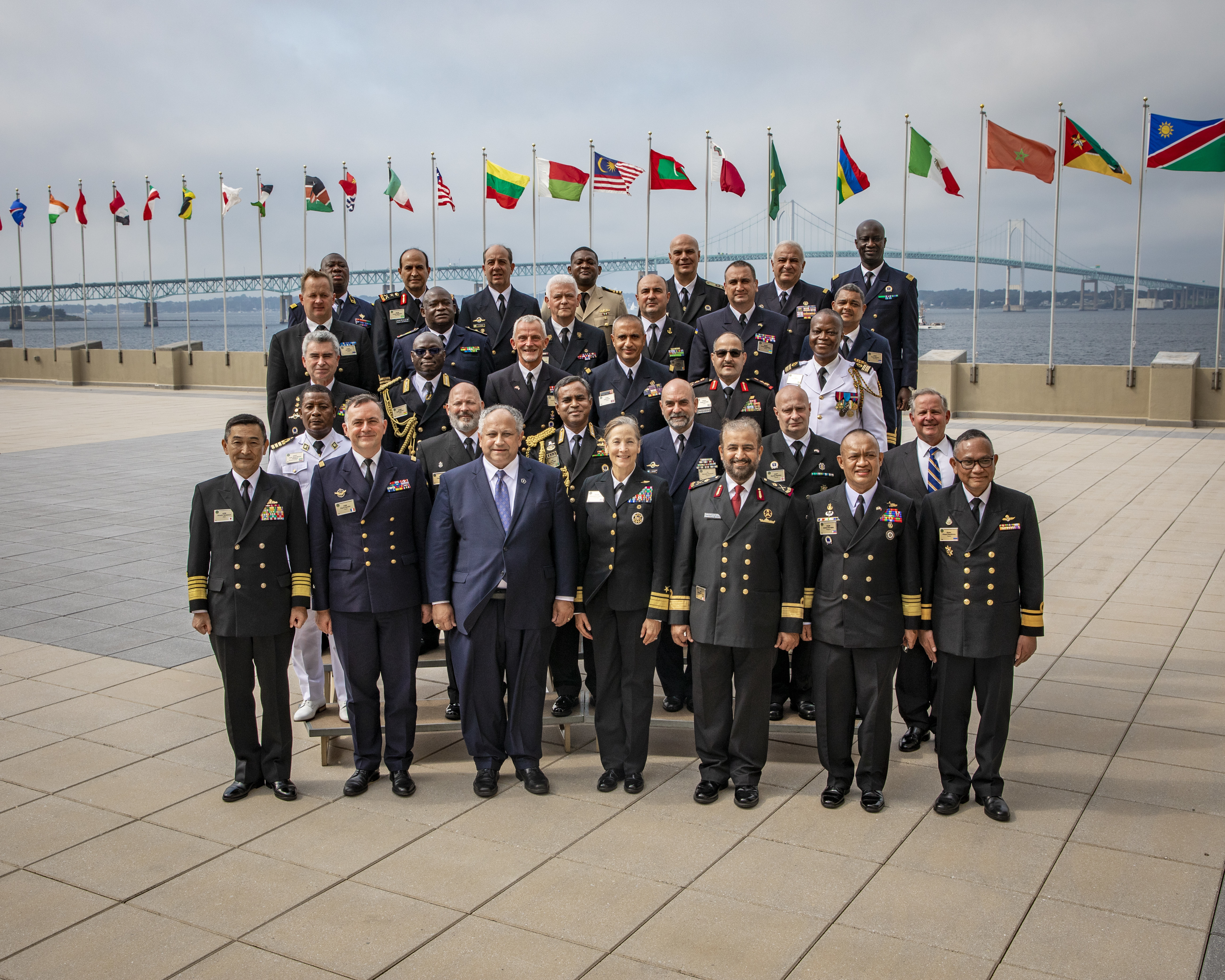
Alumni of the Naval War College pose for a photo during the 24th International Seapower Symposium (ISS) on September 15, 2021.

=== U.S. Navy ===
- Admiral Jeremy Michael Boorda, 25th Chief of Naval Operations, 1994–1996
- Admiral William J. Fallon, Commander, U.S. Pacific Command, 2005–2007; Commander, U.S. Central Command, 2007–2008
- Admiral Mark P. Fitzgerald, Commander, U.S. Naval Forces Europe and Allied Joint Force Command Naples, 2007–2010
- Admiral William E. Gortney, Commander, U.S. Fleet Forces Command, 2012–2014; Commander, U.S. Northern Command and Commander, North American Aerospace Defense Command, 2014–2016
- Fleet Admiral William F. Halsey Jr., Commander, 3rd Fleet during World War II
- Admiral Kent Hewitt, World War II decorated officer (two time recipient of the Navy Cross)
- Fleet Admiral Ernest J. King, first Commander in Chief, United States Fleet and 9th Chief of Naval Operations, 1942–1945
- Admiral George McMillin, 38th and final Naval Governor of Guam, one of the first WWII POWs at First Battle of Guam 1940–1941
- Admiral Thomas H. Moorer, 18th Chief of Naval Operations, 1967–1970; Chairman of the Joint Chiefs of Staff, 1970–1974
- Vice Admiral David C. Nichols Jr., Commander, U.S. Naval Forces Central Command / U.S. Fifth Fleet, 2003–2005; Deputy Commander, U.S. Central Command, 2005–2007
- Fleet Admiral Chester W. Nimitz, CINCPAC 1941–1945, 10th Chief of Naval Operations, 1945–1947
- Rear Admiral Alan Shepard, first American in space, 1961; fifth man on the Moon, 1971
- Admiral Raymond Spruance, Commander, 5th Fleet during World War II
- Admiral James G. Stavridis, Commander in Chief, Supreme Allied Commander Europe, 2009–2013
- Admiral Elmo Zumwalt, 19th Chief of Naval Operations, 1970–1974
- Commander (ret.) Carlos Del Toro, 78th U.S. Secretary of the Navy, 2021–2025

=== U.S. Coast Guard ===
- Admiral John B. Hayes, USCG, Commandant of the U.S. Coast Guard, 1978 - 1982
- Admiral Robert E. Kramek, USCG, Commandant of the U.S. Coast Guard, 1990–1994
- Admiral Robert J. Papp Jr., USCG, Commandant of the U.S. Coast Guard, 2010–2014
- Admiral Paul F. Zukunft, USCG, Commandant of the U.S. Coast Guard, 2014–2018

=== U.S. Marine Corps ===
- General Walter Boomer, USMC, Assistant Commandant, U.S. Marine Corps, 1992–1994
- General James E. Cartwright, USMC, Vice Chairman of the Joint Chiefs of Staff, 2007–2011
- General Michael Hagee, USMC, Commandant of the U.S. Marine Corps, 2003–2006

=== U.S. Army ===
- General Randy George, Chief of Staff of the U.S. Army, 2023–2026
- General Stanley McChrystal, Commander, International Security Assistance Force/United States Forces Afghanistan, 2009–2010
- General John Shalikashvili, Chairman of the Joint Chiefs of Staff, 1993–1997
- General Raymond T. Odierno, Chief of Staff of the U.S. Army, 2011–2015
- Lieutenant General Michael Flynn, Director of the Defense Intelligence Agency, 2012–2014
- General Mark A. Milley, Chairman of the Joint Chiefs of Staff, 2019–2023

=== U.S. Air Force ===
- General Bruce Carlson, USAF, Commander, Air Force Materiel Command, 2005–2008
- General John D. W. Corley, USAF, Commander, Air Combat Command, 2007–2009
- General Charles A. Gabriel, USAF, Chief of Staff of the U.S. Air Force, 1982–1986
- General John A. Gordon, USAF, Deputy Director, Central Intelligence Agency, 1997–2000
- General Richard E. Hawley, USAF, Commander, Air Combat Command, 1996–1999
- General C. Robert Kehler, USAF, Commander, Air Force Space Command, 2007–2011; Commander, U.S. Strategic Command, 2011–2013
- General Robert C. Oaks, USAF, Commander, Tactical Air Command, 1984–1985
- General Jerome F. O'Malley, USAF, Commander, United States Air Forces in Europe, 1990–1994

=== U.S. Space Force ===
- General John W. Raymond, USSF, Chief of Space Operations, 2019–2022
- Colonel Bree Fram, USSF

=== U.S. Foreign Service ===
- Ambassador Christopher R. Hill, U.S. Ambassador to Iraq, 2009–2010; Assistant Secretary of State for East Asian and Pacific Affairs, 2005–2009
- Ambassador James B. Smith, U.S. Ambassador to Saudi Arabia, 2009–2013

=== U.S. Civil Service ===
- Kat Cammack, U.S. Representative, Florida's 3rd congressional district, 2021-
- Frank Jimenez, former General Counsel, U.S. Department of the Navy, 2006–2009
- Hugo Teufel III, 2nd Chief Privacy Officer, Department of Homeland Security in the Government of the United States, 2006–2009
- Sean Spicer, 30th White House Press Secretary, 2017–2017

== Notable foreign graduates ==
- Vice Admiral Zahir Uddin Ahmed, Chief of Naval Staff, Bangladesh Navy, 2009–2013
- Vice Admiral Tomás Gomez Arroyo Spanish Navy, 1972–1973.
- Admiral Panagiotis Chinofotis, Chief of the Hellenic National Defense General Staff, 2005–?.
- Rear Admiral Benjamin Ohene-Kwapong Chief of the Naval Staff, Ghana Navy, 1985–1990.
- Admiral Arun Prakash, Chief of the Naval Staff, Indian Navy, and Chairman of the Chiefs of Staff Committee, India, 2004–2006.
- Vice Admiral Mohammed Farid Habib, Chief of Naval Staff, Bangladesh Navy, 2013–current
- Vice Admiral Kamal Habibollahi, Last Commander of the Imperial Iranian Navy 1975–1979.
- Rear-Admiral Lai Chung Han, Chief of the Republic of Singapore Navy, 2014–2017.
- Admiral Devendra Kumar Joshi, Chief of the Naval Staff, Indian Navy, 2012–2014.
- President Émile Lahoud, 15th President of Lebanon from November 1998 to November 2007.
- Admiral Radhakrishna Hariram Tahiliani, Chief of the Naval Staff, Indian Navy, 1984–1987.
- Vice Admiral Mateo M Mayuga AFP Flag Officer In Command, Philippine Navy 09 Dec 10 - 09 Dec 07
- Vice Admiral Mark Mellett, Chief of Staff of Defence Forces Ireland 2015–2021
- Admiral Nirmal Kumar Verma, Chief of the Naval Staff, Indian Navy, 2009–2012.
- Admiral Thisara Samarasinghe, Commander, Sri Lankan Navy (2009–2011) and Sri Lankan High Commissioner to Australia.
- Vice Admiral Russ Shalders, Chief of Navy, Australia, 2005–2008.
- Rear Admiral Predrag Stipanović, Commander of Croatian Navy (2015–present)
- General Håkan Syrén, Supreme Commander of the Swedish Armed Forces, 2003–2009; Chairman, European Union Military Committee, 2009–?.
- Vice Admiral Ko Tun-hwa former Vice Minister of Defense, Republic of China and is currently the National Policy Advisor to the President of the Republic of China (Taiwan).
- King Tupou VI of Tonga, ʻAhoʻeitu ʻUnuakiʻotonga Tukuʻaho
- Rear Admiral Mohan Wijewickrama, Governor of Eastern Province and former chief of staff, Sri Lanka Navy
- Admiral Dato' Seri Panglima Ahmad Kamarulzaman, Chief of Navy, Royal Malaysian Navy, Nov 18, 2015 – present
- Vice Admiral Edmundo Nestor Martin Felix Pimentel, Chief of Navy, Dominican Republic, Feb 2014-Feb. 2016. Currently President of the National Directorate for Drug Control (DNCD).
- Vice Admiral Miguel E. Peña Acosta, Chief of Navy, Dominican Republic, Feb 2016–Present.
- Rear Admiral Romulo Espaldon, first rear admiral of the Philippine Navy.
- Rear Admiral Sinsy Nghipandua second Namibian Navy Commander
- Vice Admiral Adeluis Bordado, Flag Officer in Command Philippine Navy
- Issah Adam Yakubu, Chief of Naval Staff (Ghana)

== Notable faculty ==
- Stephen E. Ambrose, historian and biographer
- Edward L. Beach Jr., author of Run Silent, Run Deep, inaugural holder of the Stephen B. Luce Chair of Naval Science
- Jessica D. Blankshain, Expert on civil-military relations and foreign policy analysis.
- Lindsay Cohn, Expert on military organizations, civil-military relations, international law of war, and foreign policy/public opinion.
- Yoram Dinstein (born 1936), Israeli President of Tel Aviv University
- Nikolas Gvosdev, international relations scholar.
- John B. Hattendorf, naval historian, Ernest J. King Professor of Maritime History
- Joan Johnson-Freese, emeritus Professor of National Security Affairs
- Stephen Knott, emeritus Professor of National Security Affairs
- Alfred Thayer Mahan, historian, author of The Influence of Sea Power upon History
- Tom Nichols, emeritus Professor of National Security Affairs, writer and academic specialist on international affairs.
- Sarah C. Paine, historian, author, and professor of strategy and policy
- Derek S. Reveron, expert on foreign policy and defense strategy.
- James R. Soley, naval historian and first civilian faculty member

== See also ==
- National War College
- Industrial College of the Armed Forces
- Marine Corps War College
- Army War College
- USAF Air War College
- List of National Historic Landmarks in Rhode Island
- National Register of Historic Places listings in Newport County, Rhode Island
- International Seapower Symposium
