= Mary Ellen Callahan =

American lawyer

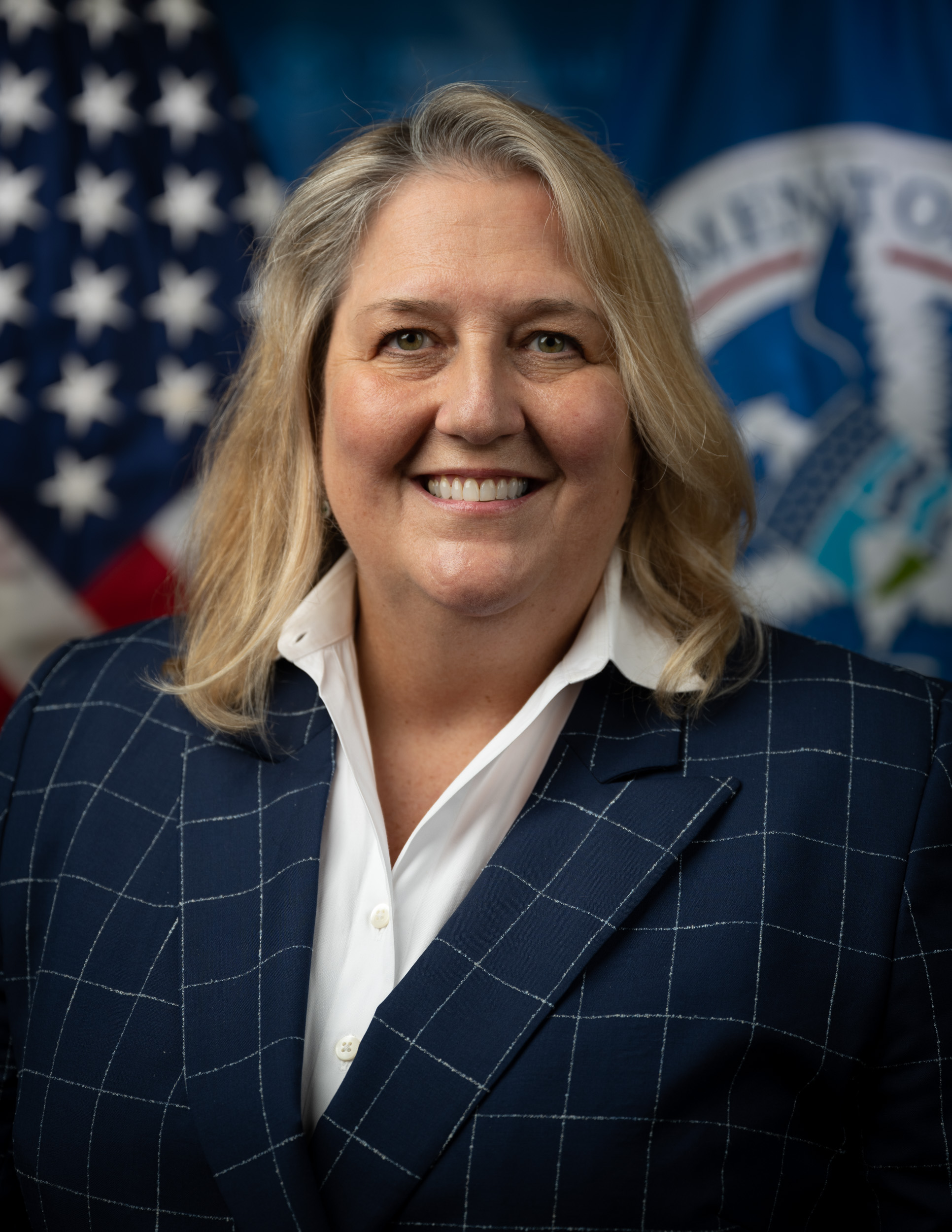

Assistant Secretary of Homeland Security for Countering Weapons of Mass Destruction
- Incumbent
- In office September 2023 – January 20, 2025
- President: Joe Biden

Personal details
- Education: University of Pittsburgh (BPhil); University of Chicago Law School (JD)

Mary Ellen Callahan is an American attorney who served as the Assistant Secretary for the DHS Countering Weapons of Mass Destruction (CWMD) Office from August 2023 to January 2025, and was the chief of staff to DHS Deputy Secretary John Tien in the Office of the Deputy Secretary at the U.S. Department of Homeland Security from 2021-2023. Callahan had also served as Chief Privacy Officer of the Department of Homeland Security from 2009-2012. She served as the General Counsel for the Lucas Museum of Narrative Art in Los Angeles, CA from 2025-2026.

== Early life and education ==
Callahan grew up in a large family in Kennett Square, Pennsylvania and graduated from Kennett High School. Callahan is a graduate of the University of Pittsburgh, she was a Trustee for the University of Pittsburgh from 2009 to 2022, including serving as the Vice Chair exercising the duties of the Chair of the Board of Trustees from 2021-2022. She is now a Trustee Emerita. Callahan is also a graduate of the University of Chicago Law School. Callahan was a student in Barack Obama's classes at the University of Chicago Law School and has spoken with the New York Times and the Washington Post about her impressions of him.

== Career ==
Callahan began her legal career with an immediate focus on public service and consumer protection, and quickly became a leading expert and advocate in the (then) emerging area of data privacy and cybersecurity law.

Callahan started her practice at Hogan & Hartson (now Hogan Lovells) from 1997 to 2009, where she counseled online companies, trade associations, and other corporations on privacy, consumer protection, and litigation matters. She represented them before government agencies on a wide range of antitrust, e-commerce, and privacy-related issues.

In 2009, Callahan was appointed by Secretary Janet Napolitano to serve as Chief Privacy Officer of the United States Department of Homeland Security (DHS). During her tenure in that role, Callahan led department-wide programs on privacy protections and information sharing, led all privacy initiatives in the DHS cybersecurity arena, served as the Department's Chief Freedom of Information Act (FOIA) Officer, and represented DHS in extensive outreach and negotiations with privacy counterparts in the European Union, Canada and other countries to explain and support the U.S. privacy framework.

From 2017 to 2021, Callahan worked as an Assistant General Counsel for the Walt Disney Company. At Disney, Callahan was a leader of the global Privacy-Legal team across all segments of the company's businesses and developed crucial and innovative privacy programs and frameworks to protect the company.

In 2021, Callahan returned to government work and to work under DHS Deputy Secretary John Tien. As Chief of Staff to the Deputy Secretary, Callahan was a key interlocutor and partner to Departments, Agencies, Office leaders, interagency partners, and the White House. Her stewardship of the Department's vital nation security interests was crucial to gains made in operations to counter-human smuggling, international multilateral relationships, and continuity of operations and government, including resilience.

In August 2023, she became the Assistant Secretary for the DHS Countering Weapons of Mass Destruction (CWMD) Office. CWMD leads the Department's efforts and coordinated with domestic and international partners to safeguard the United States against chemical, biological, radiological, and nuclear (CBRN) threats. She led CWMD through a termination threat in Autumn 2023 due to statutory requirements in the CWMD Act of 2018. After CWMD's authorization became tethered to its appropriations, CWMD redoubled its efforts to mature and strengthen the office, its strategic plan, and its relationships. In response to President Biden's Executive Order (E.O.) 14110 on Safe, Secure, and Trustworthy Development and Use of Artificial Intelligence CWMD also wrote and released a first-of-its kind report evaluating the potential for AI to be misused to enable the development of production of Chemical, Biological, Radiological, and Nuclear (CBRN) threats, while also considering the benefits and application of AI to counter them. Callahan resigned as Assistant Secretary on January 20, 2025. The CWMD Office was disbanded in May 2026.

At the Lucas Museum, Callahan led the Legal, Government Affairs, Civic Engagement, Rights and Reproductions, and Human Resources teams, and acted as the primary liaison with local and state officials regarding Exposition Park matters.

For Spring Semester 2025, Callahan was a Professor of Practice at the Georgia Institute of Technology’s School of Cybersecurity and Privacy.

Prior to law school, from 1991-1994, Callahan worked at the Library of Congress, Congressional Research Service as part of the Special Task Force on the Development of Parliamentary Institutions in Eastern Europe (a/k/a the Frost-Solomon Task Force).

== Personal life ==
Callahan was married to longtime entertainment executive Tony Lynn, who died of esophageal cancer on December 1, 2018. Callahan met Lynn while representing Playboy Entertainment Group in United States v. Playboy Entertainment Group, Inc., a successful First Amendment challenge to the Telecommunications Act of 1996.

== Awards and honors ==
Callahan is a Truman Scholar, a national scholarship for public service. She was awarded her scholarship for Pennsylvania in 1988. She serves on the Friends of Truman Foundation and the Truman Council, a leadership advisory group that meets quarterly and assists on all fronts with the Friends of Truman Foundation's fundraising and communication efforts. In May 2026, Callahan was awarded the Joseph E. Stevens Award for Public Service by the Harry S. Truman Scholarship Foundation.

Callahan is a member of the Council on Foreign Relations.

In 2011 Callahan received the Federal Computer Week's Federal 100 Award for her work on privacy and cybersecurity. In October 2013, Mary Ellen received the Privacy Vanguard Award, given by the International Association of Privacy Professionals, an annual award honoring the privacy professional who has demonstrated outstanding leadership, knowledge and creativity in privacy and data protection.

Callahan was named a Best Lawyer by the Washingtonian magazine twice: in 2013 in the field of National Security Law, and in 2015, Cybersecurity Law. In 2013, she was named a Tech Titan by Washingtonian.

In April 2022, she received an honorary Doctor of Laws degree from Pitt when she gave the (delayed) 2020 Commencement Address. (rescheduled as a result of the COVID-19 pandemic).

Callahan received the DHS Outstanding Service Medal from DHS Secretary Alejandro Mayorkas in August 2023, at the end of her tenure as the Chief of Staff to the Deputy Secretary, and another DHS Outstanding Service Medal at the end of her tenure as CWMD Assistant Secretary.

In 2024, she was named a Homeland Security Trailblazer by Homeland Security Today.

In 2025, she was awarded the Order of the Dragon, Legionnaire Award by the U.S. Army Chemical Corps Regimental Association. To qualify for the Order of the Dragon, civilians must have demonstrated the highest standards of integrity and moral character, and outstanding degree of professional competence, and have contributed to the promotion of the Chemical Corps in numerous ways over the course of their career.
