= Henry E. Eccles =

United States admiral (1898–1986)

Henry Effingham Eccles
- Born: December 31, 1898; Bayside, New York
- Died: May 14, 1986 (aged 87); Needham, Massachusetts
- Military career
- Allegiance: United States
- Branch: United States Navy
- Service years: 1922–1952
- Rank: Rear Admiral
- Commands: USS John D. Edwards; USS Washington
- Conflicts: World War II
- Awards: Navy Cross; Silver Star; Bronze Lion; Legion of Merit

Henry Effingham Eccles (December 31, 1898, Bayside, New York – May 14, 1986, Needham, Massachusetts) was a rear admiral in the United States Navy and a major figure at the Naval War College in Newport, Rhode Island, from the late 1940s through the 1970s, as a thinker and writer on naval logistics and military theory.

== Early life and education ==
The son of an Episcopal priest, the Reverend George Warrington Eccles, and his wife Lydia Lawrence, he was initially educated privately at home by his parents and later sent to Trinity School in New York City, before enrolling as an undergraduate at Columbia University. After one year at Columbia, he entered the U.S. Naval Academy, graduating with the class of 1922.

== Naval career ==
After his first assignments to battleships, Eccles attended Submarine School and served in two submarines before being ordered to Columbia University, where he earned a Master of Science degree in mechanical engineering in 1930. He commanded two submarines, then served as engineer and repair officer at the Submarine Base at New London, Connecticut; then served for nearly three years as engineer in the heavy cruiser USS Salt Lake City and two years in the Design Construction Division of the Bureau of Engineering in the Navy Department, Washington, D.C. In 1940, he was ordered to command the destroyer USS John D. Edwards on the Asiatic Station, based in the Philippines. He was in command when the Japanese simultaneously attacked Pearl Harbor as well as American and British positions in Southeast Asia on December 7, 1941. He and his ship participated in the battle of Badung Strait, and shortly after, while assigned to the American-British-Dutch-Australian Command (ABDA), the battle of the Java Sea. Wounded in action, Eccles was later awarded the Navy Cross, the Silver Star, and The Netherlands Order of the Bronze Lion.

After recovering from his wounds, Eccles served in the Base Maintenance Division in the Office of the Chief of Naval Operations in 1942-43, where he helped to coordinate logistics planning for all advanced bases. After attending the command course at the Naval War College, he was promoted to captain and assigned for the final two years of the war to be the Director of the Advance Base Section, Service Force at the headquarters of the U.S. Pacific Fleet in Hawaii. In this key position, Eccles coordinated the planning, construction, and support of advance bases in the Central Pacific, a critical aspect of the American island-hopping strategy in the war against Japan. For his service in this capacity, he received the Legion of Merit.

Immediately after the conclusion of the war, the Navy Department assigned Eccles to the Joint Operations Review Board, a group of officers from all services assigned to evaluate joint operations during World War II. From that posting, he went on to command the battleship USS Washington. In 1947, the President of the Naval War College, then Admiral Raymond A. Spruance, selected Eccles to be the first Chairman of the College’s newly established Logistics Department, an area that Spruance and others felt had been neglected in professional naval thinking during the period between the two world wars. While in that position from 1947 to 1951, Eccles wrote his first book, Operational Naval Logistics (1950), a manual for the United States Navy that was a pioneering work on the fundamentals of his subject. He left the Naval War College in 1951 with orders to be Assistant Chief of Staff for Logistics to the Commander-in-Chief, U.S. Naval Forces, Eastern Atlantic and Mediterranean (CINCNELM) with headquarters in London and, simultaneously, Assistant Chief of Staff for Logistics, to NATO’s Commander-in-Chief, Allied Forces Southern Europe (CINCSOUTH), with headquarters in Naples, Italy.

== Retirement Years ==
Eccles retired from active duty in the Navy on June 30, 1952, and was promoted to rear admiral on the retired list. Returning to his home in Newport, Rhode Island, he was closely associated with the Naval War College, where he served unofficially as a confidante and advisor to successive presidents of the College as well as an instructor for elective courses on military theory, principles of logistics, and international relations. During this period, he was also a stimulating force for the Naval War College faculty and wrote several major works. When he left Newport in 1985 to enter a retirement home in Needham, Massachusetts, the Naval War College honored him by naming its library in his honor. Henry Eccles died in Needham a year later on May 14, 1986.

== Awards ==

1st Row	Navy Cross	Silver Star	Legion of Merit
2nd Row	Purple Heart	World War I Victory Medal	American Defense Service Medal
3rd Row	American Campaign Medal	Asiatic-Pacific Campaign Medal	World War II Victory Medal

== Published works ==
- Operational Naval Logistics (1950)
- Logistics in the National Defense (1959, 1981, 1997)
- Military Concepts and Philosophy (1965)
- Military Power in a Free Society (1979)
