= Xrdb =

xrdb
- Original author: Jim Gettys
- Developers: Bob Scheifler, Phil Karlton
- Stable release: 1.2.2 / 3 June 2023; 2 years ago
- Written in: C
- Operating system: Unix-like
- Type: X Window System
- License: http://cgit.freedesktop.org/xorg/app/xrdb/tree/COPYING
- Repository: gitlab.freedesktop.org/xorg/app/xrdb

xrdb (X resource database manager) is a program used for accessing the X resources of a server. Its main use is to read a set of resources from a file and store them in the server at startup.

This program can access the resources in both read and write mode. In particular, it can read the resources stored in the server and can store a set of resources on the server, replacing or adding to the previous ones. It can operate either on the general display resources or on the ones specific to a screen. The main use of xrdb is however to load the resources when the X display server is started. For example, the instruction xrdb -load $HOME/.Xresources can be placed in scripts that are executed when the server is started to read the user preferences from the file .Xresources in his home directory.

The original version of xrdb was written by Jim Gettys and later rewritten by Bob Scheifler and Phil Karlton.

== See also ==
- X resources
- X Window System
