= David Kirkpatrick (author) =

American technology writer

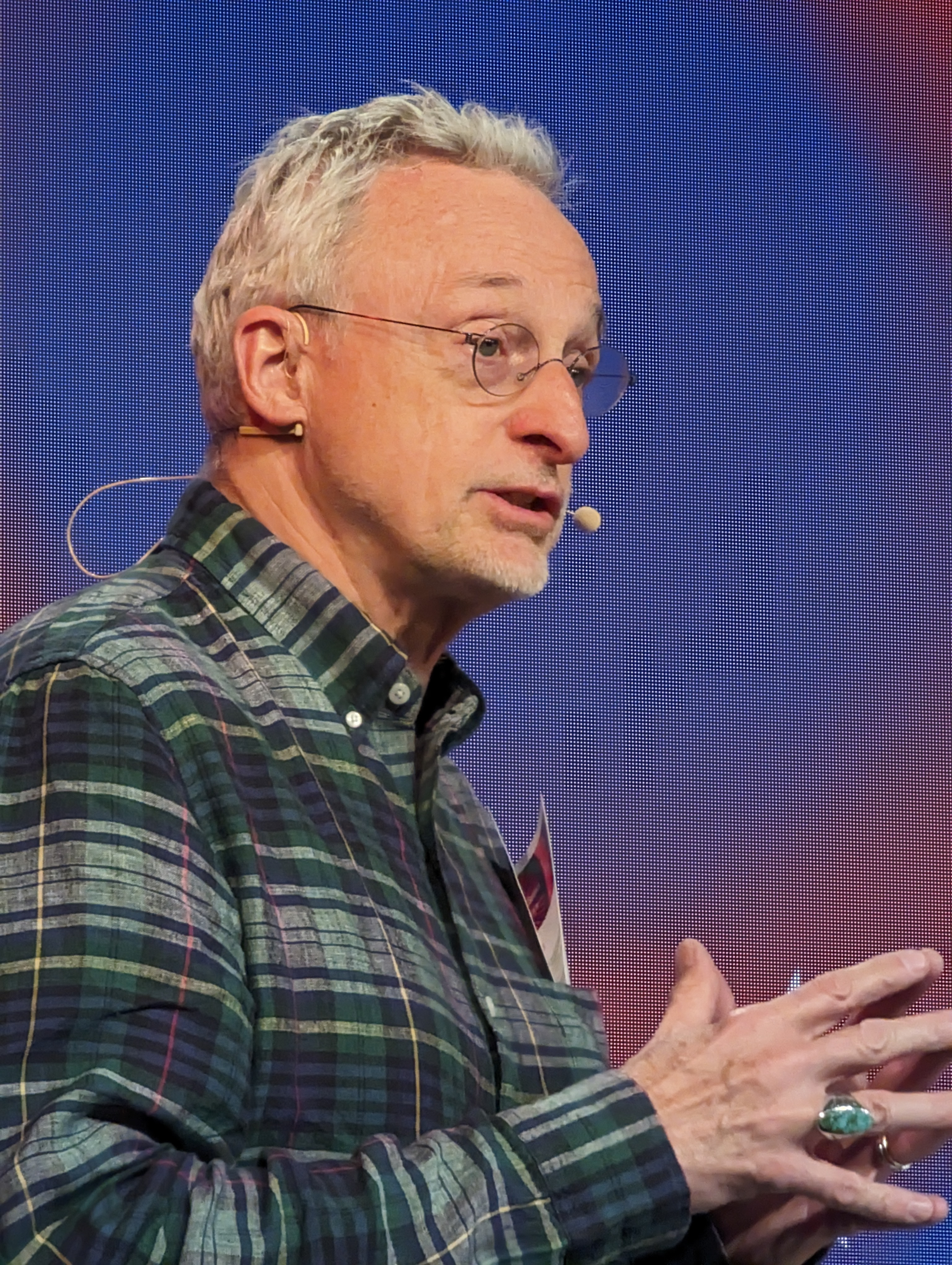
- Born: January 14, 1953 (age 73); St. Louis, Missouri
- Education: Amherst College
- Occupations: journalist, technology writer

David Kirkpatrick (born January 14, 1953) is a technology journalist, author, and organizer of technology-oriented conferences.

He is the author of The Facebook Effect: The Inside Story of the Company that is Connecting the World. Published in 2010, Kirkpatrick's book chronicles the history of the company since its inception in 2004 and documents Facebook's global impact.

Formerly Senior Editor of Internet and Technology at Fortune magazine, Kirkpatrick was until the end of 2022 the editor-in-chief of Techonomy Media Inc., a tech-focused conference company which he founded in 2011.

== Journalism career ==
Kirkpatrick graduated from Amherst College in 1975 with a degree in English, and also studied painting at the New York Studio School for Drawing, Painting and Sculpture for two years. He began his career with Time Inc. in 1978 as a copy clerk while working as a video artist. (A video artwork he co-produced was exhibited in New York's Museum of Modern Art in 1978). In 1983, he started at Fortune magazine as a reporter, becoming a writer in 1989, and then began writing exclusively about technology in January 1991. From 2002-2008, he wrote a weekly tech column called "Fast Forward." Kirkpatrick also developed and hosted Fortune's Brainstorm conference, an annual gathering in Aspen, Colorado, which began in August 2001. Brainstorm attendees during the conference's 5 years included President Bill Clinton (who attended and spoke at the conference three times), Google founders Larry Page and Sergei Brin, Sun Microsystems co-founder Bill Joy, Senator John McCain, FBI Director Robert Mueller, ecologists Paul Ehrlich and Amory Lovins, Under-Secretary of Defense Paul Wolfowitz, Former Supreme Court Justice Sandra Day O'Connor, and venture capitalist John Doerr.

Kirkpatrick has written profiles of Jack Dorsey and Sean Parker in Vanity Fair, and writes articles about technology and society for Forbes magazine. He is regularly ranked one of the world's top technology journalists, and has been a member of the World Economic Forum's International Media Council, consisting of 100 global media leaders, since 2006, as well as a member of the Council of Foreign Relations.

== The Facebook Effect ==
After meeting Facebook CEO Mark Zuckerberg in September 2006, Kirkpatrick began writing frequently about Facebook in Fortune. In January 2008 Zuckerberg agreed to cooperate on a book about the company. Kirkpatrick left Fortune in August that year to begin work on the book, which was published in June 2010. The New York Times best-selling book is the only profile on which Facebook and its CEO Mark Zuckerberg have officially cooperated, and is a best-seller in countries including Taiwan, Japan, and China. It has been published in 32 languages, including Vietnamese, Croatian, and Catalan.

== Techonomy ==
Since leaving Fortune, Kirkpatrick has continued to host and program conferences. He established Techonomy LLC in 2010, which segued into Techonomy Media in 2011. It focuses on the impact of technology on business, economics, and society. Forbes Media invested in Techonomy Media in July 2011. The company's mission is "to illuminate the connections between technology, innovation, economic growth, and social equity," and its annual Techonomy conference aims to provide a forum for leaders and innovators in tech and other industries to discuss the possibilities and implications of rapid technological acceleration. Participants at the conferences have included Bill Gates, Jack Dorsey, Jeffrey Katzenberg, Marissa Mayer, Sean Parker, Marc Benioff, and Dan Hesse.

Techonomy Media also publishes editorial content, including video journalism, on its website. Since 2012 the company has separately held an annual conference in Detroit to address competitiveness, jobs, and the urban future in an age of technology.
