= Bruce J. Katz =

American lawyer

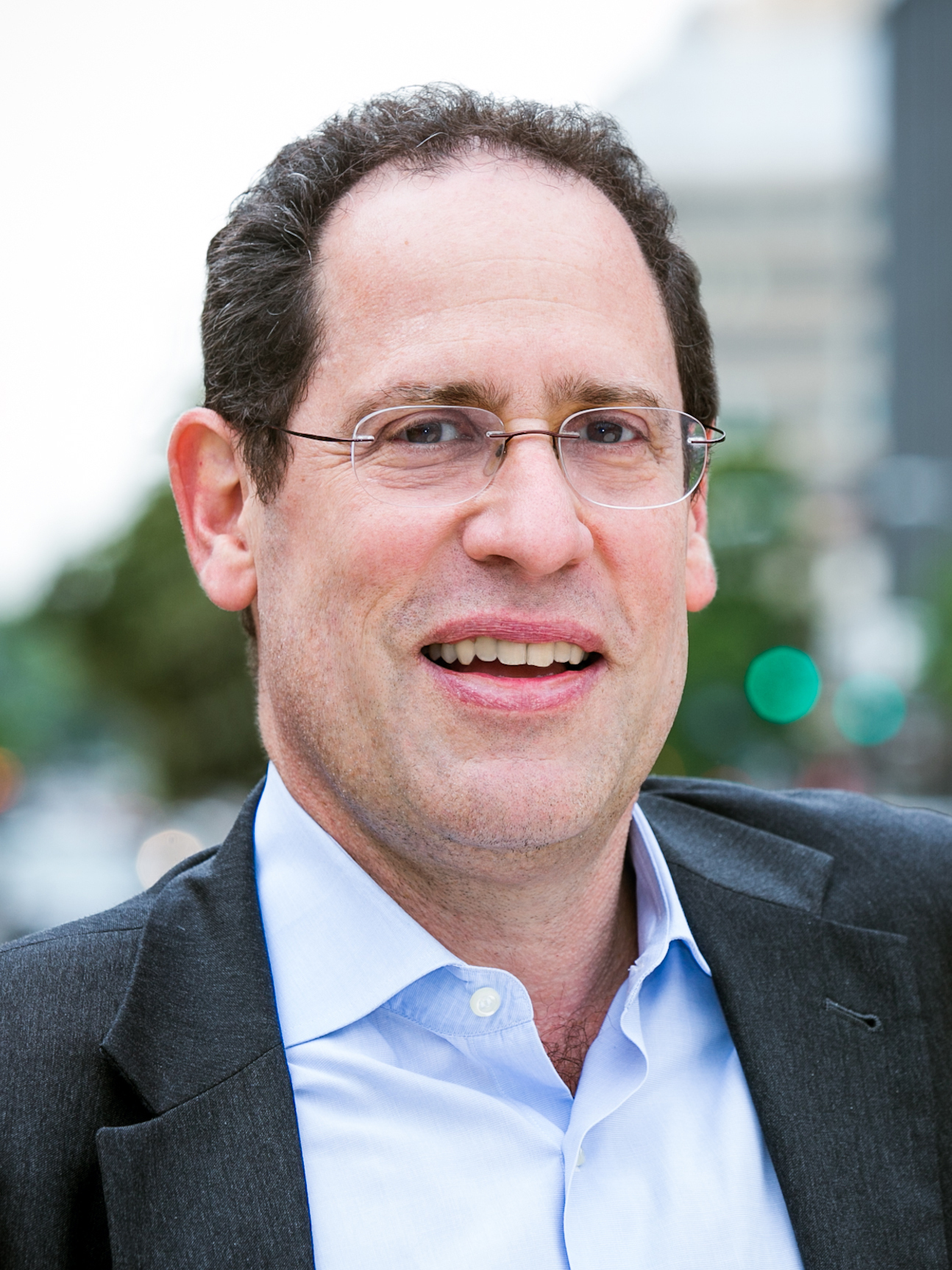
- Born: June 21, 1959 (age 66); Brooklyn, New York, U.S.
- Education: Brown University (BA); Yale University (JD)

Bruce J. Katz (born June 21, 1959) is an American lawyer, urban policy expert and author. He is currently the Director of the Nowak Metro Finance Lab at Drexel University, having formerly served as the inaugural Centennial Scholar and Vice President at the Brookings Institution.

== Education ==
Katz graduated magna cum laude with a B.A. from Brown University in 1981. At Brown, Katz received a Harvey A. Baker Fellowship and attended the London School of Economics from 1979 to 1980. He earned his J.D. from Yale Law School in 1985.

== Career ==
Katz advises federal, state, and local leaders on shifting demographic and market trends as well as on policies that are critical to metropolitan prosperity (e.g., innovation, human capital, infrastructure, housing) and new forms of metropolitan governance. After Barack Obama was elected president in 2008, Katz co-led the housing and urban transition team and served as a senior advisor to Shaun Donovan, the new Secretary of Housing and Urban Development, for the first 100 days of the Obama administration.

Katz has been a visiting professor at the London School of Economics and in 2006 won the 12th Annual Heinz Award for Public Policy. He was recognized for his work “re-imagining the function and value of cities and metropolitan areas and profoundly influencing their economic vitality, livability and sustainability”. In 2011, Katz was named a Senior Fellow of the Design Futures Council.

He served as chief of staff to Henry Cisneros, U.S. Secretary of Housing and Urban Development, from 1993 to 1996 and previously served as senior counsel and then Staff director of the United States Senate Committee on Banking, Housing, and Urban Affairs.

Katz was the inaugural Centennial Scholar at the Brookings Institution.

Katz founded and previously served as director of the Brookings Metropolitan Policy Program, which aims to provide decision makers in the public, corporate, and civic sectors with policy ideas for improving the health and prosperity of cities and metropolitan areas.

Katz is currently the Director of the Nowak Metro Finance Lab at Drexel University. He is the co-author with Jeremy Nowak of The New Localism.
