= Josh Linkner =

American entrepreneur, author, and venture capitalist

- Linkner in 2026
- Born: July 28, 1970 (age 56)
- Occupations: Entrepreneur, author, venture capitalist, keynote speaker
- Known for: ePrize, Detroit Venture Partners, Mudita Venture Partners, ImpactEleven, Disciplined Dreaming, Big Little Breakthroughs
- Website: JoshLinkner.com

Joshua M. "Josh" Linkner (born July 28, 1970) is an American entrepreneur, venture capitalist, author, and keynote speaker. He is the founder of several companies, including the interactive promotion agency ePrize, and the author of five books on innovation and creativity in business, including the 2021 release Big Little Breakthroughs."Author Talks: Josh Linkner on how everyday people can become everyday innovators". McKinsey & Company. April 26, 2021.

== Early life and education ==
Linkner was born and raised in Detroit, Michigan, and launched his first business at age 11. He was born to a Jewish family and has spoken about how his heritage shaped his values and resilience, stating that "being Jewish gives you a leg up....As Jews, we have a rich legacy of resiliency, a rich heritage of overcoming odds, We don’t make excuses." He is also an accomplished jazz guitarist, having studied at the Berklee College of Music and performed professionally from his teens. He earned a Bachelor of Science degree in advertising from the University of Florida."Meet Josh". JoshLinkner.com."Innovation Academy Featured Story". University of Florida News. May 3, 2021.

== Career ==
=== Entrepreneurship and Business Ventures ===
Linkner founded several companies, including ePrize, an interactive promotion agency, where he served as CEO and chairman. Bounds, Gwendolyn (September 6, 2005). "Building Buzz Online". The Wall Street Journal. In 2010, he became CEO and managing partner of Detroit Venture Partners, a venture capital firm focused on revitalizing Detroit through entrepreneurship and technology. Its portfolio has included Rockbot, Detroit Labs, and StockX. Linkner's efforts to foster innovation in Detroit during this time were profiled in a Microsoft feature highlighting entrepreneurs working to revive the city."Entrepreneurs help revive Detroit with heart and grit". Microsoft. November 17, 2014.$1"Detroit Venture Partners Investments". General partners have included Earvin "Magic" Johnson."Magic Johnson joins Detroit Venture Partners". Crain's Detroit. September 12, 2011.

On November 4, 2014, Linkner announced he would step down as CEO of Detroit Venture Partners to focus on writing and speaking."Linkner Steps Down from DVP". Detroit Business Journal. November 4, 2014. He later became a partner at High Level Marketing, a Michigan-based digital marketing agency."Josh Linkner joins High Level Marketing". Crain's Detroit. September 1, 2014.

In 2020, Linkner co-founded Mudita Venture Partners, a Midwest-focused early-stage venture capital firm dedicated to investing in purpose-driven startups in undercapitalized markets. The firm closed its debut fund at $40 million in October 2023 and announced a $125 million Fund II in June 2025 to expand its mission of supporting high-growth startups outside traditional tech hubs."Detroit-based Mudita Venture Partners launches $125 million Fund II". GlobeNewswire. June 25, 2025."Mudita Venture Partners closes $85 million raise". Crain's Detroit. October 3, 2023.

Linkner is also a co-founder and Chairman of Platypus Labs, a global innovation research, training, and consulting firm.

=== Public Speaking and Media Work ===
Linkner has written articles for Forbes, Inc. Magazine, Fast Company, and the Detroit Free Press. He has delivered keynotes to organizations across multiple countries and is a multiple-time TEDx speaker.

He has been featured in:

- McKinsey & Company Author Talks – “How everyday people can become everyday innovators” (2021)
- Forbes – “Driving Innovation In Customer Experience With Josh Linkner,” by Blake Morgan (2019)
- Microsoft – “Entrepreneurs help revive Detroit with heart and grit” (2014)
- The Innovator – “Interview Of The Week: Josh Linkner, Innovation Expert”
- Harvard Business Review – “Disarming Landmines Through Strategic Innovation"
- Mind Tools – Expert interview on Big Little Breakthroughs

Notable speaking appearances include:

- TEDxDetroit (2011) – “How To Overcome Natural Forces”
- TEDxFlint (2011) – “Passion”
- TEDxAlvaPark – “The Embrace of Failure” (with Paul Czarnik)
- Business of Software Conference – “How to Make the World More Creative”

== Publications ==
Linkner is the author of five books on creativity, leadership, and innovation:

Disciplined Dreaming: A Proven System to Drive Breakthrough Creativity (2011), ISBN 978-0470922224 – a New York Times bestseller, translated into multiple languages.

The Road to Reinvention: How to Drive Disruption and Accelerate Transformation (2014), ISBN 978-0470923436 – also a New York Times bestseller.

Hacking Innovation: The New Growth Model from the Sinister World of Hackers (2017), ISBN 978-1499902297

Big Little Breakthroughs: How Small, Everyday Innovations Drive Oversized Results (2021), ISBN 978-1642936773

He is also the co-author of a self-published guide on innovation:

The Find A Way Field Guide: A Practical Workbook for Unlocking Creative Capacity (2026, co-authored with Kaiser Yang)

These works have been featured in major outlets including Forbes, Harvard Business Review, and Fast Company, and have received coverage in major business media.

== Recognition ==
Linkner was named a Champion of Change by President Barack Obama in 2011 for his work in fostering youth entrepreneurship."Caught in the Act of Doing Things Right". The White House. August 24, 2011.

Linkner was named the EY Entrepreneur of the Year in 2004 and again in 2014.

Additional sources documenting Linkner’s work and public recognition include:

"Library of Congress Name Authority File: Josh Linkner". Library of Congress.

"Interactive Promotions Agency ePrize Leaps to No. 185 Among the 2006 Inc. 500". The Free Library. August 23, 2006.

"EPrize's Linkner to discuss creative solutions at Lawrence Tech May 1". Lawrence Technological University. April 27, 2012.

"Noted businessman and best-selling author Josh Linkner joins University of Michigan-Dearborn". University of Michigan-Dearborn. May 23, 2011.

Wattrick, Jeff T. (August 17, 2011). "White House to honor Detroiters Torya Blanchard, Josh Linkner as 'champions of change'". MLive.com.

"Entrepreneur Of The Year Hall of Fame". Ernst & Young.
