= Convenience translation =

A convenience translation is either when an entity displays its financial statements or other financial information in a currency that is different from either its functional currency or its presentation currency simply by translating all amounts at end-of-period exchange rates. A result of making a convenience translation is that the resulting financial information does not comply with all Generally Accepted Accounting Principles.

It is also referred to as a convenience translation when a (language) translation is rendered for the convenience of reading a text in a different from the original language; however, the original text remains the only legally binding text.

== Disclosure practice ==
Companies that present convenience translations typically state that the translated amounts are provided solely for the convenience of readers and do not represent financial statements prepared in accordance with applicable accounting standards. Such translations are commonly included in filings with the U.S. Securities and Exchange Commission (SEC) when financial information is translated into U.S. dollars from another currency.

SEC filings frequently clarify that convenience translations are not prepared in accordance with U.S. GAAP and are based on exchange rates as of a specified date, usually the closing rate at period end.
