= The Facebook Effect =

Book by David Kirkpatrick

- Cover
- Author: David Kirkpatrick
- Language: English
- Genre: Technology
- Published: June 8th 2010
- Publisher: Simon & Schuster
- Pages: 384
- ISBN: 1-439-10211-2

The Facebook Effect is a book by David Kirkpatrick and published by Simon & Schuster. It describes the history of Facebook and its social implications.

The book was shortlisted for the 2010 Financial Times and Goldman Sachs Business Book of the Year Award.

It describes how Facebook went from a dorm-room novelty to a company with 500 million users, and how Mark Zuckerberg stayed focused on growth even when it meant to raise money from investors selling the company equity.
