= Convenience function =

A convenience function is a non-essential subroutine in a programming library or framework which is intended to ease commonly performed tasks. These convenience functions may be added arbitrarily based on the creator's perception of what these menial tasks will be, or they may be the result of a process of refactoring by the developers and community feedback on what could be made into a convenience function. A convenience function's task may almost always be expressed in terms of other operations, though this will likely have increased verbiage and reduced abstraction and possibly maintainability. From this perspective, any programming language above assembly language is a 'convenience language' to avoid writing machine code.
