= Gamaekjip =

Convenience store concept

A gamaekjip, (Korean: 가맥집; lit. 'shop beer house') is a concept of convenience store originally from the city of Jeonju, South Korea. Though technically shops, it is possible to drink alcoholic beverages on the premises. Dried pollack (hwangtae - 황태) are commonly served, and a range of typical convenience store snacks are available, too. Few meals are cooked on site, and this among other reasons leads to low overheads and thus the possibility to charge lower prices than in bars. Gamaekjip first became popular in Jeonju, though they are now in decline there; they are, however, beginning to appear across the country.
