= Chief privacy officer, Department of Homeland Security =

Chief Privacy Officer Chief Freedom of Information Act (FOIA) Officer
Agency overview
- Agency executives: Roman Jankowski, Chief privacy officer Chief Freedom of Information Act (FOIA) officer; [ 2025 - Present]
- Parent agency: Department of Homeland Security
- Website: DHS Official site

Chief privacy officer, Department of Homeland Security is an appointed position within the United States Department of Homeland Security, which is part of the federal government of the United States. The chief privacy officer also serves as the chief Freedom of Information Act (FOIA) officer at the Privacy Office of the U.S. Department of Homeland Security.

== Purpose of position ==
Pursuant to Section 222 of the Homeland Security Act of 2002, The chief privacy officer has primary responsibility for privacy policy at the Department of Homeland Security. Their responsibilities include:

- Assuring that the technologies used by the department to protect the United States sustain, and do not erode privacy protections relating to the use, collection, and disclosure of personal information
- Assuring that the department complies with fair information practices as set out in the Privacy Act of 1974
- Conducting privacy impact assessments of proposed rules at the department
- Evaluating legislative and regulatory proposals involving collection, use, and disclosure of personal information by the federal government
- Preparing an annual report to Congress on the activities of the department that affect privacy.

The chief privacy officer oversees the Privacy Office, an agency staffed by over fifty privacy and data security professionals including a deputy chief privacy officer, a chief counsel, and advisors who maintain liaison with the DHS Data Privacy and Integrity Advisory Committee.

The chief privacy officer is a position mandated by statute and appointed by the United States Secretary of Homeland Security. In 2003, Secretary Tom Ridge appointed the department's first chief privacy officer, Nuala O'Connor Kelly, who held a similar post at the Department of Commerce. Hugo Teufel, III, former associate general counsel and chief counsel for privacy at DHS, was appointed as its second chief privacy officer in 2006 by Secretary Michael Chertoff. In 2009, Secretary Janet Napalitano appointed Mary Ellen Callahan to the post.

== See also ==
- Freedom of Information Act
- Privacy Office of the U.S. Department of Homeland Security
