= Christopher Wylie =

Canadian data consultant (born 1989)

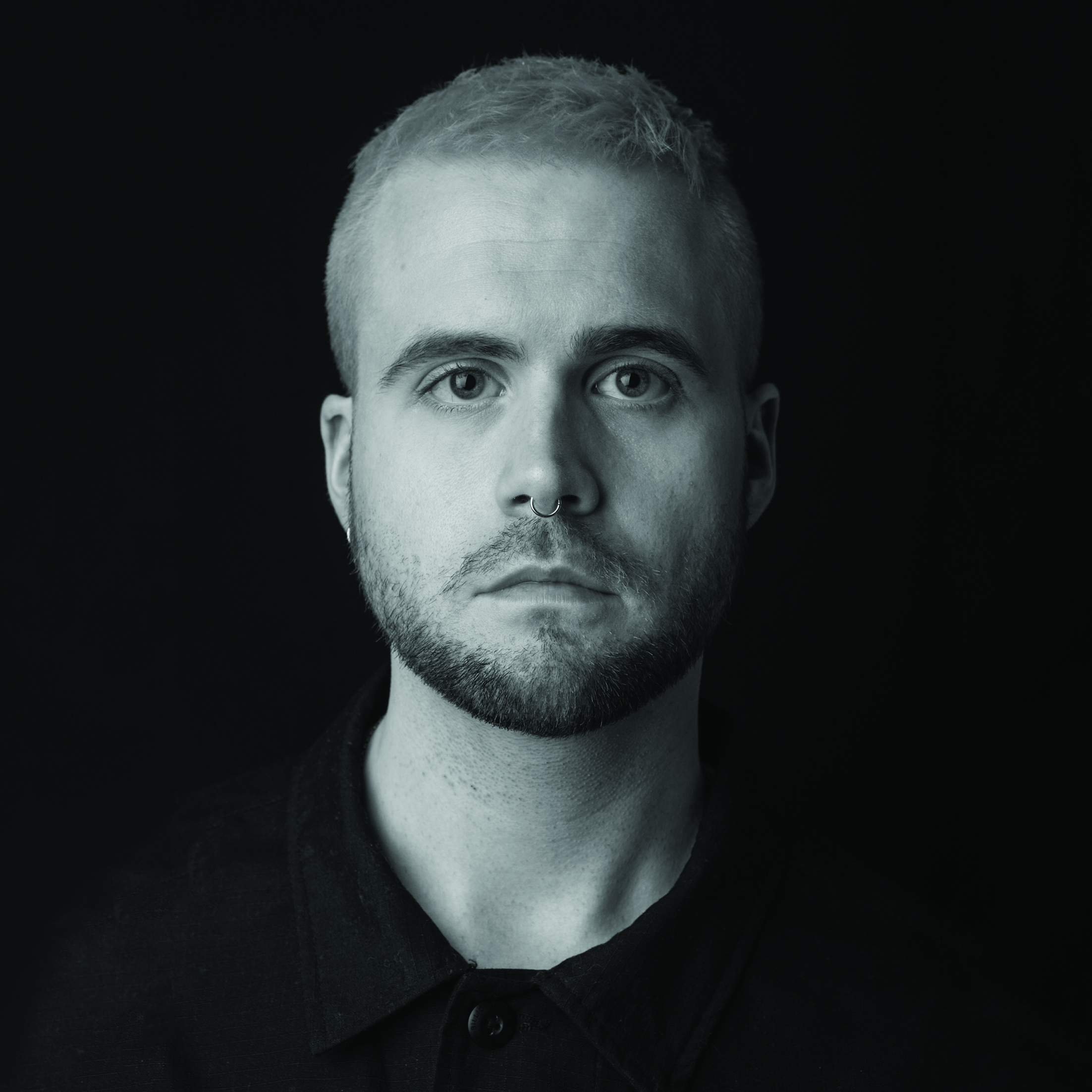
- A portrait of Wylie in 2019
- Born: 19 June 1989 (age 37); Victoria, British Columbia, Canada
- Citizenship: Canada; British (since 2024)
- Education: London School of Economics (LLB); University of the Arts London (PhD)
- Occupation: Data consultant
- Employer: H&M (since 2018)

Christopher Wylie (born 19 June 1989) is a British-Canadian data consultant. He is noted as the whistleblower who released a cache of documents to The Guardian he obtained while he worked at Cambridge Analytica. This prompted the Facebook–Cambridge Analytica data scandal, which triggered multiple government investigations and raised wider concerns about privacy, the unchecked power of Big Tech, and Western democracy's vulnerability to disinformation. Wylie was included in Time magazine's 100 Most Influential People of 2018. He appeared in the 2019 documentary The Great Hack. He is the head of insight and emerging technologies at H&M.

== Early life and education ==
Wylie was born to parents Kevin Wylie and Joan Carruthers, both physicians. He was raised in Victoria, British Columbia. As a child he was diagnosed with dyslexia and ADHD. After being abused at the age of 6 at the British Columbia Ministry of Education, which the school had tried to conceal, he sued. After a six-year legal battle, winning a settlement of $290,000 at the age of 14. The agency was also forced to overhaul its policies on inclusion and bullying. He left school in 2005 at the age of 16 without a qualification, and when asked about his "probable destiny" on his school leaver's yearbook page, he stated "just another dissociative smear merchant peddling backroom hackery in its purest Machiavellian form".

He taught himself to code at age 19.

In 2010, at the age of 20, he began studying law at the London School of Economics, graduating with a Bachelor of Laws in 2013, specialising in technology, media and IP law, and being awarded the Dechert Prize for Property Law.

Wylie has a PhD in predicting fashions trends from the University of the Arts London.

== Career ==
=== 2005–2012 ===
After leaving school, Wylie moved to Ottawa, where he began volunteering for "a short stint" in the parliamentary office of his Member of Parliament, Keith Martin. During his time in Martin's office, he overlapped with Martin's executive assistant Jeff Silvester, who was later commissioned by Wylie to set up AggregateIQ. The following year, he got a job as a contractor in the office of the Canadian opposition leader, Michael Ignatieff, at the age of 19. During his contract, Wylie begun developing strategies on how to capitalize data harvested through social media for political gain. The party officials did not renew Wylie's contract in 2009, and a senior insider said it was largely because his ideas were seen as "too invasive." Of Wylie, the colleague said, "Let's say he had boundary issues on data even back then. He effectively pitched an earlier version of [the Cambridge Analytica data-harvesting operation] to us back in 2009 and we said, 'No.'"

In 2008, he volunteered on the presidential campaign of Barack Obama, learning about microtargeting from Obama campaign adviser Ken Strasma. There has been some dispute over whether his volunteer role was a senior or a junior-level data entry role.

In 2012, Wylie worked for the Liberal Democrats in the UK on voter targeting.

=== SCL Elections and Cambridge Analytica, 2013–14 ===
In 2013, Wylie discovered some research on psychological profiling using social data funded by DARPA and used that knowledge when he began working for SCL Elections, formerly Strategic Communication Laboratories, and its offshoot for American elections (later renamed Cambridge Analytica), an international consultancy specialising in data-driven psychographic targeting in elections. Alexander Nix recruited Wylie for his small team in SCL and Wylie assembled the core of what would later become Cambridge Analytica, made up of psychologists and data scientists. His role at Cambridge Analytica was reported by the Parliament of the United Kingdom as its "director of research" and by Time as a "founder," but a Queen's Counsel (QC) report by Julian Malins disputed those titles, documenting that his employment contract stated he was hired as a part-time "intern" on a student visa, limited to 19 hours of work a week.

Wylie's role at SCL was first revealed in May 2017 by The Observer journalist Carole Cadwalladr, who wrote that "He’s the one who brought data and micro-targeting [individualised political messages] to Cambridge Analytica". He said that traditional analytics around voter profiling used voting records and purchase histories to predict voter behavior, but that it was useless for learning if a voter was "a neurotic introvert, a religious extrovert, a fair-minded liberal or a fan of the occult," which were among the traits Wylie and his team determined were uniquely susceptible to political messaging. Wylie found research done at Cambridge University which mapped Facebook likes to personality traits, research that was done by paying users to take a quiz and download an app that scraped private information from the profiles of the participants and their friends. Academic Aleksandr Kogan was commissioned by Wylie's team to build a similar application, which illegally scraped the personal data of 87 million people from their Facebook profiles, and the data was used to develop new forms of psychographic microtargeting. Facebook denied any knowledge of Kogan's program, citing that he had said he was "collecting information for academic purposes," and agreed that it would not be used for "commercial purposes." Kogan declined to comment on the matter, citing Non-disclosure agreements with both Facebook and Cambridge Analytica, beyond the statements that his application was "a very standard vanilla Facebook app," that Wylie's team assured him that their usage was legal, and that he did not personally profit from the work. Cambridge Analytica has repeatedly denied obtaining or using Facebook data, and further denied they influenced the outcome of the 2016 United States presidential election.

Wylie worked for American Republican candidates affiliated with the party's "Tea Party" wing in the 2014 United States elections; and on disinformation campaigns for political parties in Nigeria, Kenya, Ghana and the Caribbean.

Prior to his departure, Wylie had shared his profiling tool with Robert Mercer, the billionaire who funded Cambridge Analytica and later became one of Donald Trump's mega-donors, and with Steve Bannon, who effectively ran the company from 2014 onward and later went on to become Trump's campaign manager. Wylie's research work included message-testing work for Steve Bannon on building a wall on the American-Mexican border. He later recounted, "My ears perked up when I [later] started hearing some of these things like 'drain the swamp' or 'build the wall' or 'the deep state' because these were all narratives that had come out from the research that we were doing," and that the wall "is not really about stopping immigrants. It's to embody separation. If you can embody that separation and you can further distance in the minds of Americans us here in America and them elsewhere, even if it is just across a river, or just across a desert, then you have won that culture war."

Wylie has said he did not realize the "potential misuse" of his research at the time, referring to it as his "real failure," and to the work he did as, "political hackery." He said that if he had taken a job offer with Deloitte, Cambridge Analytica would not exist. He resigned in 2014.

=== Eunoia Technologies, 2014–17 ===
In 2014, Wylie co-founded Eunoia Technologies along with former SCL/Cambridge Analytica senior staff Brent Clickard, Mark Gettleson and Tadas Jucikas. In describing his ambitions for developing Eunoia, Wylie stated "I want to build the NSA’s wet dream". Eunoia Technologies has been criticized for the similar psychographic profiling tactics used by Cambridge Analytica, using the same dataset shared by Kogan.

In December 2014, Wylie registered Eunoia Technologies Inc in the tax haven of Delaware. In May 2015, a wholly owned UK subsidiary of Eunoia was registered in the UK as Eunoia Technologies Ltd. The name "Eunoia" meant "beautiful thinking" in ancient Greek, and the company offered election-related consultancy services including "psychographic microtargeting", "multi-agent system voter behaviour simulation", and "data & communications management".

Wylie's lawyer subsequently assured journalists that Eunoia had no data, but parliamentary testimony from Kogan later revealed that Eunoia had possessed Kogan's full data set of 87 million Facebook users; and that SCL/Cambridge Analytica had only ever had access to some 4% of the scraped data, "in contrast with the contract with Mr. Wylie’s entity Eunoia, where Eunoia received all of the page like data as well as dyads", and that unlike SCL/Cambridge Analytica, Wylie's company had been the only organization Kogan granted complete access to the dataset.

During the Easter of 2015, two of Wylie's Eunoia colleagues who had joined him from SCL, Tadas Jucikas and Mark Gettleson, flew to New York to meet Donald Trump's then-campaign manager on his 2016 presidential bid, Corey Lewandowski, for a meeting in a Central Park hotel. They pitched for Eunoia to work on the 2016 Trump presidential campaign, but were ultimately unsuccessful. The approach to the Trump campaign was made with Wylie's knowledge as CEO of Eunoia, and reportedly had his blessing.

In November 2015, Eunoia Technologies pitched Facebook data-mining techniques to the Liberal Party of Canada, securing a $100,000 contract in January 2016 for "a short-lived pilot project" with the Liberal Caucus Research Bureau. However, the contract was not renewed beyond the pilot.

From 2015, Wylie and Gettleson became embroiled in litigation with SCL, alleging that Eunoia had infringed SCL's intellectual property, had misappropriated SCL's data, had attempted to 'poach' other SCL contractors, and had attempted to 'poach' SCL's clients. Wylie elaborated on the Eunoia allegations when denying them: "They tried to sue me over their claims that I was somehow trying to steal their clients, or to somehow try to interfere with their contractual relations with other employees, or what have you." SCL later claimed that Eunoia had been "the subject of restraining undertakings to prevent the misuse of the company's intellectual property". A QC's report noted:

"On 21 May 2015, SCL discovered that Eunoia Technologies Limited had approached at least one of SCL’s existing clients in the USA, following confirmation from a US political client that they had received a proposal from Eunoia Technologies, which purported to deliver exactly the same services as SCL. Consequently, SCL’s lawyers wrote to Wylie and others at Eunoia Technologies Limited regarding suspected breaches of covenants on intellectual property, client solicitation, staff solicitation and non-competition."

Eunoia Technologies Ltd was voluntarily wound up in October 2017, with accounts running up to 31 May 2016.

=== 2018–present ===
On 1 December 2018, Wylie was hired by H&M as its consulting director of research, eventually being promoted to its head of insight and emerging technologies.

In November 2018, Wylie spoke at the Web Summit in Lisbon, where he called for stronger regulation of social media and online advertising, and a professional code of ethics for data scientists. Later that month, at The Business of Fashion's VOICES event in Oxfordshire, he discussed the use of artificial intelligence to reduce waste in the fashion industry and announced his forthcoming role at H&M. In March 2019, he spoke at the Marketing Festival in Prague, warning that technology companies' control over digital infrastructure could threaten personal freedom.

== EU Referendum campaign ==
Wylie has repeatedly denied having had any involvement in the 2016 United Kingdom European Union referendum, describing himself as "A Eurosceptic, but I wouldn’t call myself a Brexiteer", and pointing to his having been abroad at the time of the referendum. He has conceded that most of the key personnel involved in the Vote Leave campaign's digital and campaign financing controversies were all friends or colleagues of his, including BeLeave founder Darren Grimes, BeLeave Treasurer Shahmir Sanni, AggregateIQ founders Zack Massingham and Jeff Silvester (a company set up at Wylie's instigation when he was SCL's director of research), and Vote Leave HQ staffer Mark Gettleson (who recruited AggregateIQ to work for Vote Leave), with Sanni and Gettleson later becoming witnesses in criminal investigations of the Vote Leave campaign.

It subsequently emerged that in January 2016, Wylie and Gettleson wrote a joint proposal, on behalf of Eunoia, to Vote Leave campaign Director Dominic Cummings, to pitch for a pilot providing microtargeting services to the Leave campaign in the 2016 United Kingdom European Union membership referendum. The pitch was ultimately unsuccessful, with Cummings later describing them as "charlatans". Gettleson subsequently admitted that they had only made the pitch to Vote Leave after first making a pitch to the opposing Remain campaign in November 2015.

It was subsequently reported that on the morning of the referendum result, Wylie posted the "Brexit butterfly" graphic to his social media in support of Brexit, along with the caption "We did it", tagging four individuals: Conservative MP Nigel Evans of the Vote Leave campaign board; BeLeave founder Darren Grimes, later found guilty by the Electoral Commission of using BeLeave as a vehicle for illegally breaking campaign spending limits; and Leave campaigners Luis Lopez and Shahmir Sanni, with the latter later becoming a "whistleblower" on Vote Leave's campaign finance breaches.

== Whistleblowing ==
In March 2018, Wylie released a cache of documents to The Guardian centered around Cambridge Analytica's alleged unauthorized possession of personal private data from up to 87 million Facebook user accounts, which was obtained for the purpose of creating targeted digital advertising campaigns. The campaigns were based on psychological and personality profiles mined from the Facebook data which Wylie had commissioned in a mass-data scraping exercise.

On the 18 March 2018, Wylie gave a series of detailed interviews to The Observer with revelations about his time at SCL/Cambridge Analytica, presenting himself as a whistleblower. He subsequently provided testimony and materials to a range of inquiries and legislatures around the world, and his revelations were instrumental in the May 2018 collapse of Cambridge Analytica. Wylie admitted to having been the principal anonymous source for a May 2017 The Observer article by Carole Cadwalladr, which first drew attention to Cambridge Analytica. Cadwalladr subsequently related how she had tracked Wylie down via LinkedIn in early 2017, and after finding him "fascinating, funny and brilliant", had spent a year persuading him to go public with his allegations.

On March 27, 2018, Wylie provided evidence to the Digital, Culture, Media and Sport Committee of the UK Parliament that contained further revelations about the practices at Cambridge Analytica and its associated companies.

Wylie said that as a result of his whistleblowing, Facebook suspended his account, along with his accounts on the platforms its subsidiaries, Instagram and WhatsApp, although WhatsApp denied that any action was taken on Wylie's account.

Wylie authored a book about the subject matter: Wylie, Christopher (October 2019). Mindf*ck: inside Cambridge Analytica's plot to break the world. London, United Kingdom: Profile Books. ISBN 978-178816-506-8.

== Personal life ==
Wylie is self-described as gay and vegan. He lives in London, England.

Wylie became a British citizen on 24 January 2024.

== See also ==
- Sophie Zhang
- Frances Haugen
- Brittany Kaiser
