= Alexander Oakes =

British businessman and co-founder of SCL Group

Alexander Waddington Oakes
- Born: Alexander Waddington Oakes; November 1968 (age 57)
- Education: Eton
- Occupation: Businessman
- Known for: Cambridge Analytica scandal
- Title: Co-founder and executive of SCL Group
- Parent: Major John Waddington Oakes
- Relatives: Nigel John Oakes (brother)

Alexander Waddington Oakes (born November 1968) is a British businessman and the co-founder and an executive of Behavioural Dynamics Institute and SCL Group (formerly Strategic Communication Laboratories), the parent company of Cambridge Analytica and her sister AggregateIQ; the companies became known to a wider audience as a result of the Facebook–Cambridge Analytica data scandal involving the misuse of data. From the early 1990s, Oakes' companies, operating under succession of names, were contracted to assist political campaigns and governments in a variety of countries.

== Early life ==
Alexander Oakes' brother Nigel John Oakes was also an executive (CEO) with SCL Group/Cambridge Analytica.

== Career ==
In 2005, Oakes co-founded the London-based SCL Group (formerly Strategic Communication Laboratories), along with his older brother Nigel Oakes and Alexander Nix, described as a polo playboy whose father Paul David Ashburner Nix also became an investor in the company.

In 2013, SCL established Cambridge Analytica, a subsidiary aiming to target the American elections market and led by fellow Old Etonian Alexander Nix, a director of SCL for 14 years. The company was engaged by the Ted Cruz and Donald Trump campaigns during the 2016 US presidential election, and reportedly also worked on dozens of other elections in the U.S. during its existence. The company went bankrupt in 2018 following the Facebook–Cambridge Analytica data scandal. Cambridge Analytica claimed to use honey traps, bribery stings, and prostitutes, among other tactics, to influence more than 200 elections globally for its clients.
