= The Great Hack =

2019 documentary film

- Official release poster
- Directed by: Karim Amer; Jehane Noujaim
- Written by: Karim Amer; Erin Barnett; Pedro Kos
- Produced by: Karim Amer; Geralyn White Dreyfous; Judy Korin; Pedro Kos
- Starring: Carole Cadwalladr; David Carroll; Brittany Kaiser
- Edited by: Erin Barnett; Carlos Rojas
- Production company: The Othrs
- Distributed by: Netflix
- Release dates: January 26, 2019 (Sundance); July 24, 2019 (United States)
- Running time: 113 minutes
- Country: United States

The Great Hack is a 2019 documentary film about the Facebook–Cambridge Analytica data scandal, produced and directed by Jehane Noujaim and Karim Amer, both previous documentary Academy Award nominees for The Square. The film's music was composed by Emmy-nominated film composer Gil Talmi. The Great Hack premiered at the 2019 Sundance Film Festival in the Documentary Premieres section and was released by Netflix on July 24, 2019.

The documentary focuses on David Carroll of Parsons and The New School, Brittany Kaiser (former business development director for Cambridge Analytica), and British investigative journalist Carole Cadwalladr. Their stories interweave to expose the work of Cambridge Analytica in the politics of various countries, including the United Kingdom's Brexit campaign and the 2016 United States elections.

== Background ==
The SCL Group was a private research and strategic communications company interested in studying and influencing mass behavior. With alleged expertise in psychological operations (psyops), the company worked in military and political operations around the world in the late 1990s, including electioneering in the developing world throughout the early 2000s. To do business involving US elections, the subsidiary Cambridge Analytica was formed in 2012.

In 2015, Cambridge Analytica, a UK-based political consulting firm, began working on behalf of Ted Cruz's presidential campaign to attempt to win the 2016 US Republican nomination. It used Facebook as a means for "political-voter surveillance" through the collection of user data points. Independent investigations into data mining, along with whistle-blower accounts of the firm's impact on Brexit, led to a scandal over the influence of social media in political elections.

In the film, the Cambridge Analytica scandal is examined through the eyes of several involved persons.

== Scandal ==
Cambridge Analytica, the firm responsible for the scandal, was dedicated to big data. The data collected was meant to be used as part of a sales strategy that involved creating massive campaigns that approached users in a personal manner. The results of this campaign ended up disrupting US and UK politics and led to claims of complicity of social media enterprises such as Facebook. The illicit harvesting of personal data by Cambridge Analytica was first reported in December 2015 by Harry Davies, a journalist for The Guardian. He reported that Cambridge Analytica was working for United States senator Ted Cruz and used data harvested from millions of people's Facebook accounts without their consent.

Facebook refused to comment on the story other than to say it was investigating. Further reports followed in the Swiss publication Das Magazin by Hannes Grassegger and Mikael Krogerus (December 2016), (later translated and published by Vice), Carole Cadwalladr in The Guardian (starting in February 2017) and Mattathias Schwartz in The Intercept (March 2017). Brittany Kaiser, former director of Business Development at Cambridge Analytica, revealed that everything published involving Cambridge Analytica in the Brexit campaign and Ted Cruz's campaign was true. The scandal reached a point where even Mark Zuckerberg, Facebook's founder, had to testify officially in front of several committees of the United States Congress.

== Synopsis ==
When Cambridge Analytica's former CEO Alexander Nix was exposed on Channel 4 as claiming to have 5,000 data points on every American voter, Professor David Carroll took notice. He undertook a legal journey to try to reclaim his data with the help of lawyer Ravi Naik of ITN Solicitors, an expert on data privacy in the United Kingdom. Because Cambridge Analytica processed user data via SCL in Britain, Carroll's complaints fell under British jurisdiction. On July 4, 2017, Carroll filed a complaint with the Information Commissioner's Office of the UK. As a result, SCL was fined £15,000 for a lack of compliance with the ICO. Also, as a result, Facebook paid £500,000 for a "lack of transparency and security issues relating to the harvesting of data constituting" in the related scandal.

During the proceedings, SCL filed for bankruptcy. The ICO concluded that Cambridge Analytica's operations had violated UK privacy laws, stating: "Had SCLE still existed in its original form, our intention would have been to issue the company with a substantial fine for severe breaches of principle one of the DPA1998 for unfairly processing people's data for political purposes including purposes connected with the 2016 U.S. Presidential campaigns."

While David Carroll's journey unfolds, the investigative journalist Carole Cadwalladr continues her work into the influence of Cambridge Analytica. This work leads her to a whistle-blower, Christopher Wylie, who explains how microtargeting, combined with mass-harvesting of data, was used to influence elections. Cadwalladr's exclusive interviews with Wylie in The Observer reveal how psychographic profiling tactics were carried out with user data scraped from Facebook with the help of Cambridge University researcher Aleksandr Kogan. These allegations take the Cambridge Analytica scandal public and lead Wylie to testifying in the UK Parliament and mentioning the name of a former director at Cambridge Analytica, Brittany Kaiser. A polarizing yet essential part of the Cambridge Analytica scandal, Wylie penned a tell-all called Mindf*ck in 2019.

The filmmakers track down Brittany Kaiser in Thailand, where she considers becoming a whistle-blower and making information about Cambridge Analytica public, or dodging press inquiries and questions. With the help of British-born social entrepreneur, writer, and organizer Paul Hilder, she decides to go back to Washington DC, to come clean. With the help of specific documents from her personal Cambridge Analytica archives, Kaiser explains the effective micro-targeting of unsuspecting individuals, particularly those she calls "persuadables", by Cambridge Analytica in the 2016 United States elections.

== Cast ==
- Carole Cadwalladr, British investigative journalist and feature writer for The Observer.
- David Carroll, associate professor of media design at the Parsons School of Design at The New School who filed a formal complaint against Cambridge Analytica under the UK Data Protection Act 1998 to obtain his data, profile and score.
- Brittany Kaiser, former business development director of SCL Group, the parent company of Cambridge Analytica.
- Julian Wheatland, last CEO and former COO and CFO of Cambridge Analytica, chairman of SCL.
- Roger McNamee, fund manager and venture capitalist, an early investor in Facebook.
- Christopher Wylie, former director of research at Cambridge Analytica, and whistle-blower.
- Ravi Naik, solicitor specialising in data rights.
- Paul Hilder, writer and political technologist.
- Paul-Olivier Dehaye, data and privacy researcher.

== Reception ==
The Great Hack holds an 85% rating on Rotten Tomatoes, based on 54 reviews with an average rating of 7.1/10. The review aggregator's consensus reads: "The Great Hack offers an alarming glimpse of the way data is being weaponized for political gain—and what it might mean for future elections."

On Metacritic, the film has a weighted average score of 67 out of 100, based on 18 critic reviews.

Peter Bradshaw writing in The Guardian said the film concerned "the biggest scandal of our time: the gigantic question mark over the legality of the Brexit vote", and awarded it five stars. Calling the film "a terrifying warning" and "the most important doc this year", Refinery29 wrote: "The Great Hack makes clear just how deep that shady surveillance can – and does – go."

It was nominated for an Emmy for Outstanding Documentary or Nonfiction Special by the Academy of Television Arts & Sciences, nominated for Best Documentary by the British Academy of Film and Television Arts, nominated for Best Writing by the International Documentary Association, and was shortlisted for the Academy Award for Best Documentary Feature Film. The film received an Outstanding Achievement in Graphic Design or Animation Award from Cinema Eye Honors.

== See also ==
- Cambridge Analytica
- Facebook
- Facebook–Cambridge Analytica data scandal
- The Social Dilemma
