= Emerdata Limited =

Political consulting company based in London

Emerdata Limited is a political consulting company based in London, formed in 2017 after filing for insolvency of Cambridge Analytica. Emerdata is accused by privacy advocates as its rebranded form and is headed by several of its executives.

== Background ==
Former employees of Cambridge Analytica and SCL moved to successor firms, these companies dissolved with acquisition by holding company Emerdata Limited. The company now appears to be largely owned by Rebekah Mercer and Jennifer Mercer, according to Cambridge Analytica's bankruptcy filing in New York. Cambridge Analytica was before partially owned by their family, including their father Robert Mercer, a computer scientist who made contributions to brown clustering.

In July 2018 the Emerdata director was Jacquelyn James-Varga. Rebekah and Jennifer Mercer were appointed as directors of the company in the same year. The Federal Trade Commission of the United States has imposed to sue Cambridge Analytica after misusing data scraped from 87 million unwitting social media users. Emerdata Limited soon acquired the company after the news on misappropriation of digital assets was publicized.

== Activities ==
The internal administrators (during the David Carroll case) of Emerdata Limited have been accused of misleading an adjudicator according to the High Court of England and Wales. Adjudicator Robert Hildyard, who had earlier granted Cambridge Analytica a legal motion to be put into administration, "wasn't told" that administrators of High Court (Vincent Green and Mark Newman of liquidator Crowe LLP) were, allegedly, not "independent" of Cambridge Analytica.

The High Court of Justice of England and Wales affirms Emerdata's subsidiaries or daughter companies are the SCL Group Ltd and SCL Analytics Ltd. The trading subsidiaries of SCL Analytics Ltd are SCL Commercial Limited which provided data analysis to commercial customers, SCL Social Limited which provided campaign management and communications services to political customers, and SCL Elections Limited. In April 2019, 21% of Emerdata's shares were held by three individuals, Alexander Nix, Julian Wheatland and Nigel Oakes. Julian Wheatland is now its sole director.

== See also ==
- Cambridge Analytica
- Aggregate IQ
- SCL Group
- Alexander Nix
- Facebook–Cambridge Analytica data scandal
- BeLeave
- The Great Hack, 2019 documentary film
