= Michal Kosinski =

American-Polish computational psychologist

- (Michał Kosiński)
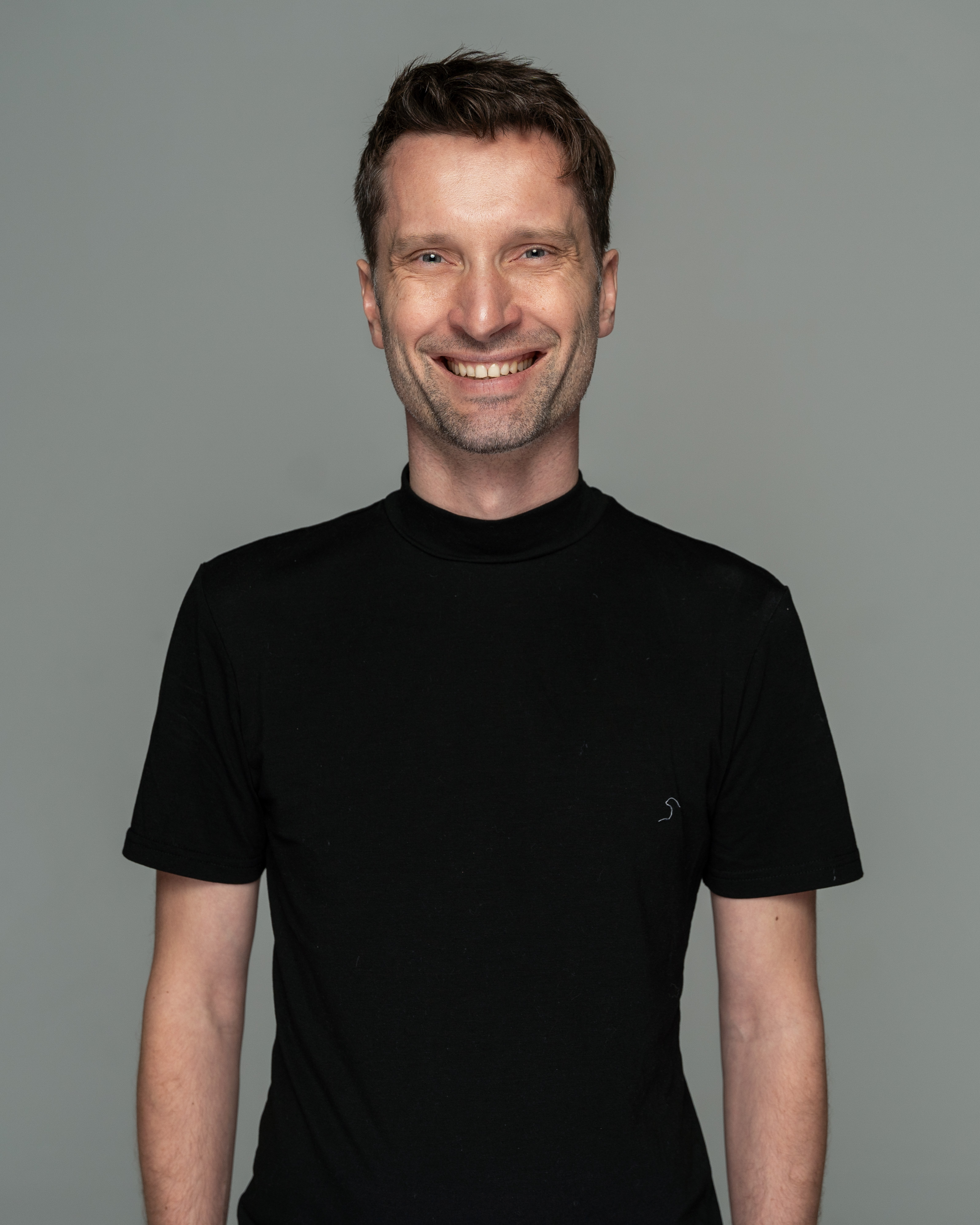
- Born: May 8, 1982 (age 44); Warsaw, Poland
- Citizenship: American, Polish
- Education: University of Cambridge (MPhil, PhD); University of Social Sciences and Humanities in Warsaw (MSc)
- Occupation: Professor
- Years active: 1999-present
- Employer: Stanford University
- Known for: Research on predicting psychological traits from digital footprints; First article warning against Cambridge Analytica
- Title: Associate professor, Stanford University
- Website: michalkosinski.com

Michal Kosinski is an associate professor of Organizational Behavior at Stanford University, a computational psychologist, and a psychometrician. His research spans computational psychometrics, the privacy risks of digital footprints, facial recognition, and the psychology of artificial intelligence.

He has co-authored the textbook Modern Psychometrics and published over 80 peer-reviewed papers in journals including Nature Computational Science, Scientific Reports, Proceedings of the National Academy of Sciences, Psychological Science, Journal of Personality and Social Psychology, and Machine Learning, that have been cited over 28,000 times according to Google Scholar.

He is among the top 1% of Highly Cited Researchers according to Clarivate. His research inspired a cover of The Economist, a 2014 theatre play "Privacy", and was discussed in thousands of books, press articles, podcasts, and documentaries. Kosinski was behind the first press article warning against Cambridge Analytica published in The Guardian. His research demonstrated the privacy risks of digital footprints and showed that personality-based targeting can increase the effectiveness of mass persuasion.

Kosinski appeared in the documentaries iHuman (2019) and Do You Trust This Computer (2018).

== Education ==
Kosinski holds a doctorate in psychology from the University of Cambridge and master's degrees in psychometrics and in social psychology. He previously served as a post-doctoral scholar at Stanford's Computer Science Department, as the deputy director of the University of Cambridge Psychometrics Centre, and as a researcher at Microsoft Research (Machine Learning Group).

== Research ==
In 2013, Kosinski and David Stillwell published a paper entitled "Private Traits and Attributes Are Predictable from Digital Records of Human Behavior". They claimed that Facebook Likes reveal personal traits and sensitive attributes, from sexual and political orientation to mental health. "Individual traits and attributes can be predicted to a high degree of accuracy based on records of users' Likes," they wrote. In 2012, Facebook patented a method doing precisely what Kosinski and Stillwell did, "Determining user personality characteristics from social networking system communications and characteristics".

In 2015, Kosinski, Youyou, and Stillwell published a study in PNAS reporting that computer-based personality judgments derived from Facebook Likes were more accurate than judgments made by friends, family members, and spouses.

In 2017, Kosinski, Matz, Nave, and Stillwell published a PNAS study reporting that psychologically tailored advertising messages could increase the effectiveness of digital mass persuasion.

In 2017, Kosinski co-published a paper showing that modern artificial intelligence can predict someone's sexual orientation based on facial images. The research was conducted on over 130,000 pictures and used existing facial recognition systems and AI algorithm. Their AI could predict the sexual orientation of gay men 81% of the time, while a human would be right 61% of the time.

In 2021, Kosinski published a study in Scientific Reports demonstrating that facial recognition technology can predict political orientation from naturalistic facial images with 72% accuracy, substantially better than chance or conventional methods such as personality questionnaires.

Since 2023, Kosinski's research has increasingly focused on the cognitive and social capacities of large language models. In a 2023 study in Scientific Reports, Digutsch and Kosinski compared semantic activation in GPT-3 with human lexical decision data, reporting that GPT-3's semantic activation broadly mirrored human patterns but was more strongly driven by semantic similarity than by associative relatedness. In Nature Computational Science, Hagendorff, Fabi, and Kosinski tested OpenAI language models on cognitive-reflection and semantic-illusion tasks, reporting that human-like intuitive errors emerged in larger pre-ChatGPT models but were reduced in ChatGPT. In 2024, Kosinski published a study in PNAS evaluating eleven large language models on false-belief tasks used to study theory of mind, reporting that older models solved no tasks while GPT-4 solved 75% of the tasks, matching the performance of six-year-old children reported in previous studies. Related work examined language-model agency through negotiation games and the extent to which large language models encode public perceptions of public figures' personalities.

== Mypersonality database ==
Kosinski and David Stillwell co-created the myPersonality Facebook application and database, which became a major research resource for social scientists. A 2015 article in American Psychologist stated that the myPersonality application was owned by Stillwell and Kosinski, and that their Facebook-based psychological studies had attracted over 10 million participants.

== Controversies ==
His research on facial recognition systems raised controversy. Kosinski and Wang stated that their findings were intended to expose the risks posed by existing computer-vision technologies, writing that such systems could threaten the privacy and safety of gay men and women. Some scholars have labeled his work "pseudoscience."

While Deputy Director of the University of Cambridge Psychometrics Centre, Kosinski was approached by departmental colleague Aleksandr Kogan about a potential collaboration with SCL Group, Cambridge Analytica's parent company. The Centre's co-director David Stillwell first declined to share its data, as it had been collected for academic purposes; an alternative was proposed in which Kogan would collect new data and pass it through the Centre's prediction models. Kogan testified that he calculated a price of $500,000 for the Centre's models ("I thought, all right, maybe we will give the Psychometrics Centre $500,000 for the modelling aspect"); SCL considered the price too high and "instructed [Kogan] to remove them from the project." Kogan subsequently built his own Facebook app independently; he confirmed in 2017 that "no data or models from the psychometrics centre were ever used for anything with SCL." Kosinski raised a formal complaint with university authorities, calling Kogan's approach "highly unethical," leading to legal undertakings prohibiting any use of the Centre's work in the project. In November 2014, Kosinski contacted The Guardian and provided documents about the Kogan-SCL connection; the newspaper's resulting December 2015 article was the first press report about Cambridge Analytica's data practices. No official investigation, including those by the FTC, UK ICO, and UK Parliament, has identified Kosinski as involved with Cambridge Analytica.

== See also ==
- Ethics of artificial intelligence
- AI takeover
