= John Waddington Oakes =

British military officer (1932–2021)

- Born: 23 September 1932
- Died: 23 May 2021 (aged 88)
- Occupation(s): Military officer and High Sheriff of Warwickshire
- Relatives: Nigel Oakes (son), Alexander Waddington Oakes (son)

John Waddington Oakes (23 September 1932 – 23 May 2021) was a British military officer and public official who served as High Sheriff of Warwickshire in 1996. In the 1980s, he bought Whichford House, a grade II* listed house in the village of Whichford, Warwickshire. His grandfather Beilby Porteus Oakes was a descendant of Beilby Porteus. He married Annette Christine Swire; they had three children, among them two sons, businessmen Nigel Oakes and Alexander Waddington Oakes, both of whom were involved with the controversial companies SCL Group and Cambridge Analytica.

He was also an alpine skier and competed in two events at the 1960 Winter Olympics. Oakes died in May 2021, at the age of 88.
