= Data Propria =

Behavioral data science company

Data Propria, Inc.
- Type: Subsidiary
- Predecessor: Cambridge Analytica
- Founded: February 2018
- Headquarters: San Antonio, Texas
- Key people: Matt Oczkowski (president); Brad Parscale (director and part owner of parent company CloudCommerce, Inc.)
- Parent: CloudCommerce, Inc.
- Website: DataPropria.com

Data Propria is a company formed in 2018. It is managed by Cambridge Analytica's former head of product, Matt Oczkowski, and employs at least three other former Cambridge Analytica staffers including Cambridge Analytica's former chief data scientist, David Wilkinson. It reportedly worked on the 2020 Donald Trump presidential campaign.

== Notable clients ==
In May 2018, Bruce Rauner, the Governor of Illinois, was reported to be using Data Propria in his re-election campaign.

Circa May–June 2018, Data Propria was reported to be electioneering for Donald Trump's 2020 re-election campaign. Company president Matt Oczkowski and parent company part-owner Brad Parscale denied the accuracy of these reports, despite having claimed, in front of reporters, that Data Propria was working on that campaign. An anonymous source additionally confirmed Data Propria's involvement with the campaign.

In June 2018, Oczkowski and Parscale confirmed that Data Propria had signed a contract with the Republican Party's governing body (the RNC), to assist the party in the 2018 midterm US elections.

== Data sources ==
In June 2018, Data Propria was sent an open letter by U.S. Representatives Michael F. Doyle, Frank Pallone, and Jan Schakowsky. The letter asked Data Propria to confirm the provenance of its datasets, and especially whether they contain material improperly acquired from Facebook by Aleksandr Kogan or Cambridge Analytica.

== See also ==
- Emerdata
- Facebook–Cambridge Analytica data scandal
- 2020 United States presidential election
