= Jonathan Marland, Baron Marland =

British businessman (born 1956)

The Right Honourable The Lord Marland
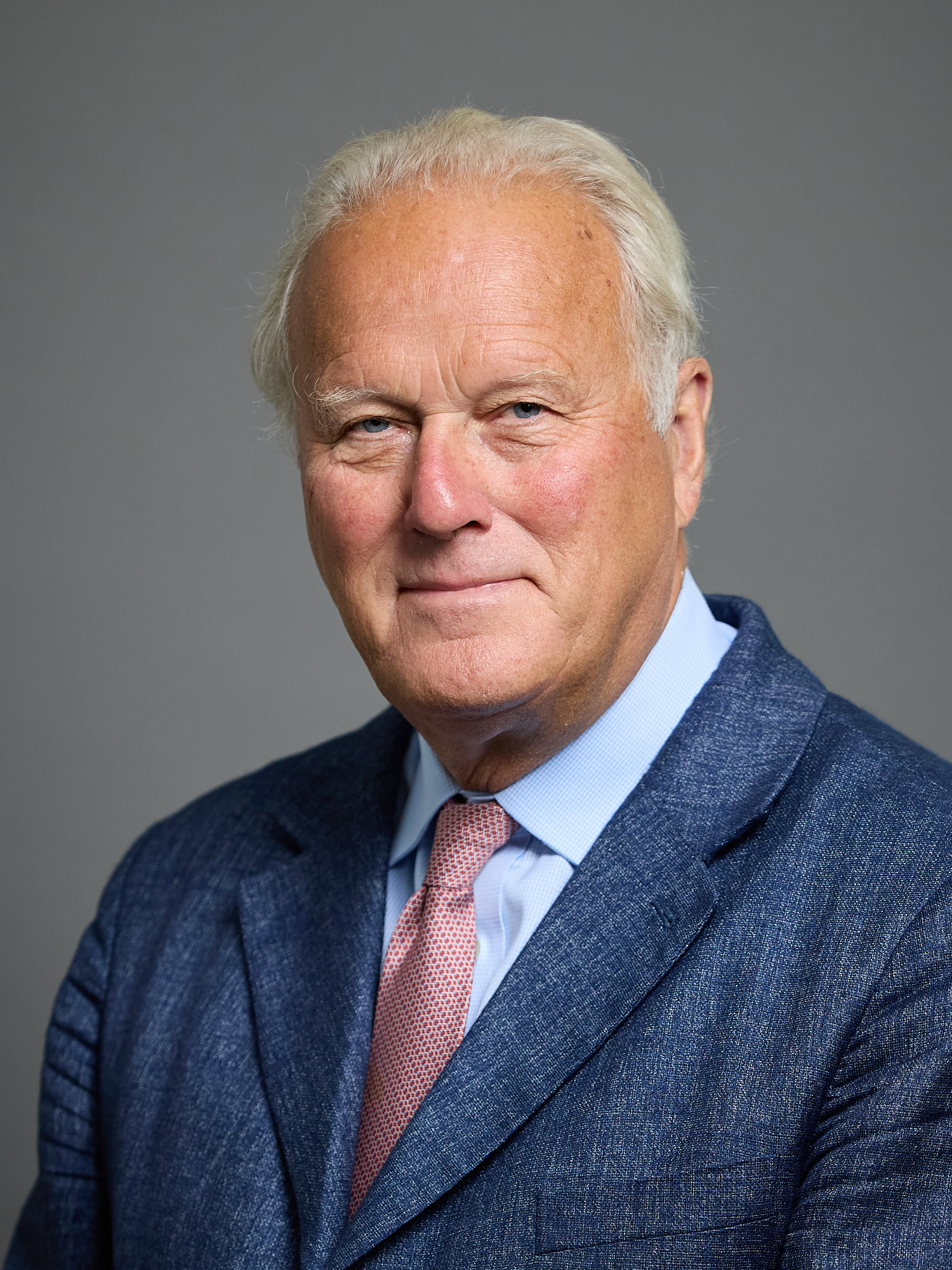
- Official portrait, 2025

Chairman of Commonwealth Enterprise and Investment Council
- Incumbent
- Assumed office 1 July 2014
- Prime Minister: David Cameron; Theresa May; Boris Johnson; Liz Truss; Rishi Sunak; Keir Starmer

Member of the House of Lords
- Lord Temporal
- Life peerage 8 June 2006

Personal details
- Born: Jonathan Peter Marland; 14 August 1956 (age 70)
- Party: Conservative

Jonathan Peter Marland, Baron Marland (born 14 August 1956) is a British businessman and politician, having served as Prime Minister's Trade Envoy, Minister for Energy and Climate Change and Business, Innovation and Skills, and Treasurer of the Conservative Party.

Marland is currently the Chairman of the Commonwealth Enterprise and Investment Council which is a membership organisation which promotes trade, investment, and the role of the private sector across the 56 Commonwealth member states.

== Education ==
Marland was educated at Shrewsbury School.

== Business career ==
Marland was one of the founding directors of Jardine Lloyd Thompson, a multinational insurance business, where he led the acquisitions and bespoke underwriting of companies including Hunter Boot Ltd (2006), and backed the online news magazine The World Weekly (2013). He also founded the Jubilee insurance company at Lloyd's of London.

He continues his involvement in the business world, and is the chairman at Bspoke Insurance Group Ltd, Insurance Capital Partners Ltd., and EcoWorld Management and Advisory Services (UK) Ltd. He is a member of the Investment Advisory Committee of the Kuwait Investment Authority. He currently serves as co-chair of the International Advisory Council for the World Digital Chamber. He was one of the owners of SCL Group and Cambridge Analytica, having been convinced by Nigel Oakes to invest in a company that should focus on "security and military advice".

== Political career ==
=== Government posts ===
In 2010, Marland was made a Minister at the Department of Energy and Climate Change.

In May 2011 he was appointed as the Chairman of the British Business Ambassadors by UK Trade & Investment (UKTI).

In 2012, Marland was made a Minister for Intellectual property in the Department for Business, Innovation and Skills. He was the Prime Minister's Trade Envoy between 2011 and 2014.

In 2014 he became Chairman of the Commonwealth Enterprise and Investment Council.

=== Party and parliamentary roles ===
Marland was the Conservative candidate for the target seat of Somerton and Frome at the 2001 general election, coming second to the incumbent Liberal Democrat MP, David Heath.

He was Treasurer to the Conservative Party from 2003 to 2007, and subsequently became a key part of the team which saw the election of Boris Johnson as Mayor of London.

=== Opposition posts ===
In 2009, Marland was made an opposition Whip in the House of Lords, as well as an opposition spokesman for the Cabinet Office, and the Department of Energy and Climate Change.

=== Other ===
Lord Marland frequently provides commentary on British Politics. He initiated the Peer Review Podcast, featuring interviews with a curated selection of House of Lords Peers in 2023.

== Other interests ==
Away from business and politics, Marland has interests in the arts and sport.

In December 2021, the Prime Minister appointed Lord Marland as a Trustee of the British Museum.

He is the chairman of Tickets for Troops. He was the former Chairman of the International Churchill Society, formerly known as The Churchill Centre UK. He is a Founding Trustee of the Atlantic Partnership.

He is a former trustee of the Holburne Museum in Bath, and Development Board Member of the Royal Academy of Arts.

He was the president of The Commonwealth Youth Orchestra and Choir, and served as chairman and trustee for the Guggenheim UK Charitable Trust for 20 years. He was a member of the Peggy Guggenheim Museum Executive Board.

=== Sport ===
He is a patron of Salisbury and South Wiltshire Cricket and Hockey Club. He was chairman of The Sports Nexus Trust and Harnham Water Meadows Trust. He was president of Salisbury City F.C. and is a member of the MCC. In January 2009 he challenged Giles Clarke for the chairmanship of the ECB but was unsuccessful, despite having pledged to raise a £100m capital fund for development across all 18 counties if elected as chairman.

== Personal life ==
Lord Marland was born in Windsor and has four children.

== Honours and awards ==
He was awarded a life peerage on 8 June 2006 as Baron Marland, of Odstock in the County of Wiltshire. In recognition of his longstanding contributions to the advancement of commercial and bilateral relations with Malta, he was honoured with the Maltese Order of Merit in 2015.

In May 2024, Marland was awarded the Bangabandhu-Edward Heath Friendship Award 2023 for his extraordinary contributions to promote trade and business relations between the UK and Bangladesh.

== Arms ==
Coat of arms of Jonathan Marland, Baron Marland
Adopted 2007 Coronet Coronet of a Baron Crest A lion sejant erect Or gorged with a plain collar attached thereto a line terminating in a ring Sable and holding between the forefeet a bobbin also Sable the yarn Or. Escutcheon Azure on each of three bars wavy Or two martlets respectant Sable. Supporters On either side a Labrador Sable gorged with a plain collar Or and holding in the interior forepaw three bulrushes Sable slipped and leaved Or. Motto Fortior Leone Justus (A Just Man Is Stronger Than A Lion) Badge Two martlets respectant that on the dexter quarterly Sable and Or and that on the sinister quarterly Or and Sable. Symbolism The Arms are a variation on those hitherto borne by the family without proper authority. Black labradors have been increasingly popular in heraldry; and in this instance they are shown holding bullrushes as the grantee is Chairman of a marshland environmental project. The bobbin in the Crest refers to the grantee's wife Penelope. The classical Penelope was associated with weaving a winding sheet during the absence of her husband Odysseus.

Orders of precedence in the United Kingdom
Preceded by The Lord Morris of Handsworth	Gentlemen; Baron Marland	Followed by The Lord Patel of Bradford
