= AIQ =

AIQ may refer to:

- AggregateIQ, a Canadian political consultancy and technology company
- Aimaq dialect, a dialect of the Persian language (ISO 639-3 code "aiq")
- Thai AirAsia, a low-cost airline of Thailand (ICAO airline code AIQ)
- Artificial intelligence quotient, the IQ of an AI
