= Hannes Grassegger =

German journalist and economist

Hannes Grassegger (born 1980) is a Swiss economist, investigative journalist, and technologist known for his in-depth reporting on the intersection of technology, economics, and society. His work primarily explores how networked technology influences our economy and daily lives, with a focus on issues such as disinformation, microtargeting, and digital campaigning.

== Early life and education ==
Hannes Grassegger earned a Bachelor of Arts in economics from Humboldt University of Berlin and a Master of Arts from the University of Zürich.

== Career ==
As an investigative tech-journalist, Grassegger has covered topics including targeting technologies, information warfare, blockchain, the emergence of anti-tech movements, and the governance of social media companies like Facebook and TikTok. His articles and essays have been published and translated globally in outlets such as The Guardian, Die Zeit, Der Spiegel, Internazionale, Süddeutsche Zeitung, ProPublica, Buzzfeed, Das Magazin (CH), Neue Zürcher Zeitung, and the Financial Times Deutschland.

He serves as the technology reporter for Das Magazin (Zürich), Switzerland's leading weekly, and has served as a staff writer for Reportagen, a leading long-form magazine.

== Notable works ==
In 2014, Grassegger published his first book, "Das Kapital bin Ich" ("I Am Capital"), arguing that individuals should become the sole owners of their data.

He gained international recognition for his investigations into Cambridge Analytica and Facebook's content moderation system.

== Awards and recognitions ==
Grassegger's work has earned him several awards and scholarships, including:

- Fellow at the Wilson Center Washington D.C. (2018)
- Gerald Loeb Award for Beat Reporting (2018)
- Swiss Media Prize for Financial Journalism (2018)
- Wächterpreis der Tagespresse (2018)
- Deutscher Journalistenpreis (German Journalism Prize) (2017)
- Helmut-Schmidt Preis (2017)
- Zürcher Journalistenpreis (2016)
- Dr. Georg Schreiber Preis (2012)

== Current projects ==
Grassegger is a member of the World Economic Forum's Global Experts Community and served on the Global Future Council on Media, Sports and Entertainment for 2020/2021. He has appeared in several documentaries and commented on tech, campaigning, and disinformation on platforms including BBC, CNN, and Al Jazeera.
