= Auspex International =

Data analytics company formed in London in 2018

- Founded: May 2018; 8 years ago in London
- Headquarters: London
- Key people: Mark Turnbull (M.D.); Ahmad Al Khatib
- Services: data analytics
- Website: Official website

Auspex International is a company founded in London in 2018, by former Cambridge Analytica staff members Mark Turnbull and Ahmad Al Khatib. It is one of several companies founded by people formerly affiliated with Cambridge Analytica following its downfall in the aftermath of the Facebook–Cambridge Analytica data scandal involving the misuse of data.

The company is in the field of data analytics and works in Africa and the Middle East.
