= Alexander Nix =

British businessman

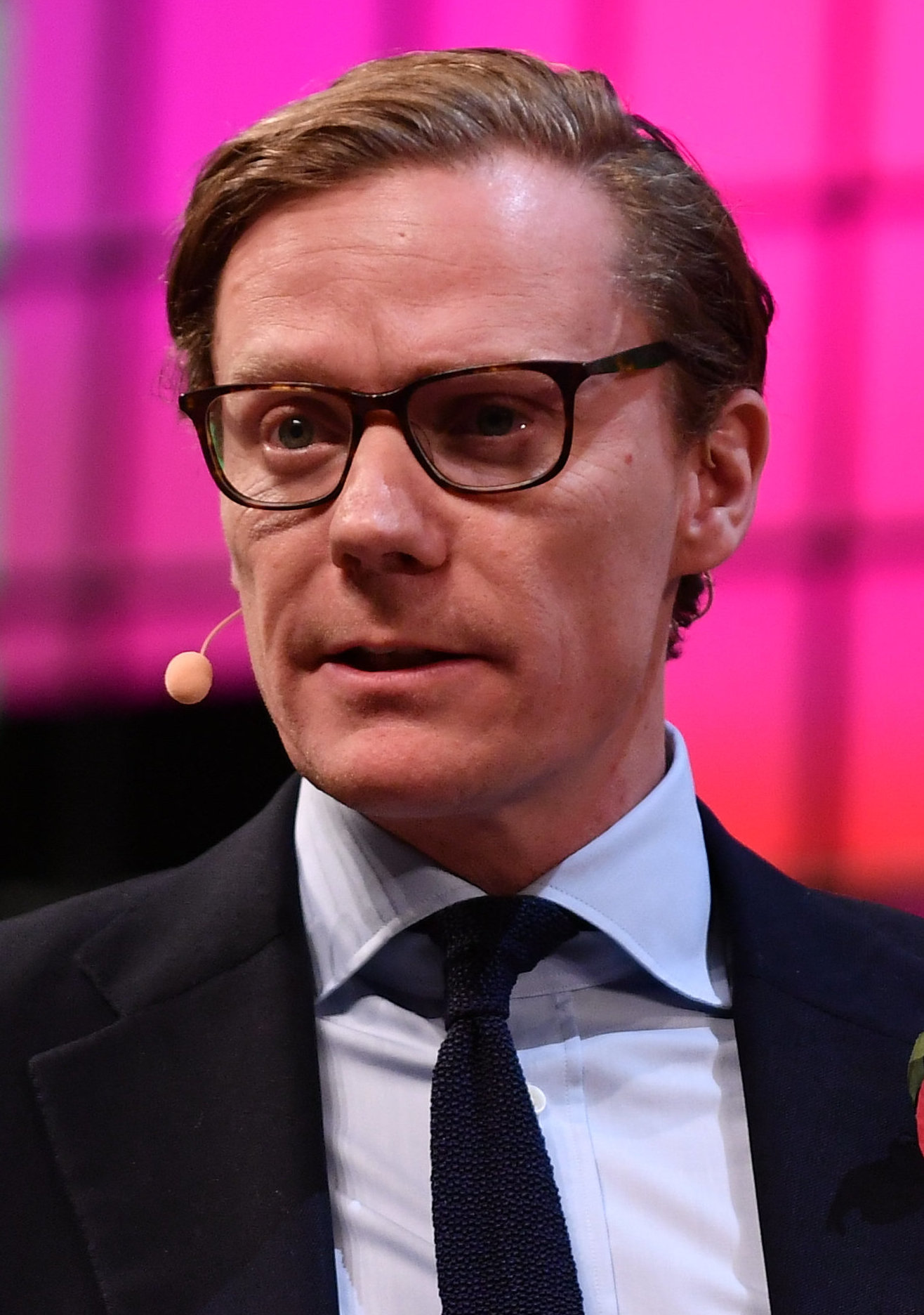
- Alexander Nix at Web Summit 2017 in Lisbon
- Born: Alexander James Ashburner Nix; 1 May 1975 (age 51)
- Education: Eton College
- Alma mater: University of Manchester
- Occupations: Director (formerly), Emerdata; Director (formerly), SCL Group; CEO (formerly), Cambridge Analytica
- Spouse: Olympia Paus
- Children: 3
- Family: Nix family

Alexander James Ashburner Nix (born 1 May 1975) is a British businessman best known as the former chief executive of Cambridge Analytica and a director of SCL Group. He led SCL's elections division and, in 2013, helped establish Cambridge Analytica to offer data-driven political consulting in the United States and overseas, including work during the 2016 U.S. presidential cycle and many campaigns around world.

Nix came to wider public attention during the Facebook–Cambridge Analytica data scandal. In March 2018, reporting alleged that the firm had obtained Facebook user data via an academic app without adequate consent. Channel 4 News then aired undercover footage in which Nix described the company's aggressive opposition-research tactics. He was suspended as chief executive, and in May 2018 the company announced it would cease operations and enter insolvency. In 2020 Nix accepted a seven-year director-disqualification undertaking in the United Kingdom.

== Early life ==
Nix was born into the Ashburner–Nix family and grew up in Notting Hill, West London. He was educated at Eton College and studied art history at the University of Manchester.

His father, Paul David Ashburner Nix (1944–2006), was an investment manager who spent twenty-seven years with M&G Group before joining Consulta in 1995. He later held shares in SCL Group, a British behavioural research and strategic communications company founded in 1993.

Nix began his career as a financial analyst with Baring Securities in Mexico City and subsequently worked at Robert Fraser & Partners LLP, a tax and corporate finance firm. In 2003 he moved from finance into strategic communications, joining SCL Group.

=== Family and personal life ===
Nix is married to Olympia Paus, a Norwegian businesswoman and member of the Wilhelmsen family, which controls the Wilh. Wilhelmsen shipping group. Their engagement was announced in 2010. They have three children.

== Career ==
=== Cambridge Analytica ===
After joining SCL Group in 2003, Nix spent a decade in its strategic communications arm. In 2013 he established Cambridge Analytica (CA) as a political communications affiliate of SCL and became its chief executive. CA promoted data-driven voter targeting based on large datasets and behavioural segmentation, and it opened offices in London, New York and Washington DC. Outside the United States, the firm worked across Africa, Asia, Europe, and Latin America. Company materials claimed work on "more than 40" political campaigns in these regions.

In the United States, CA was active in the 2014 midterm elections and in the 2016 presidential cycle. Backed by funding linked to the Mercer family, major Republican donors with long-standing ties to U.S. conservative causes, the firm first supported the Ted Cruz campaign and later worked with the Donald Trump campaign. Its voter targeting aimed to identify persuadable or undecided audiences and deliver tailored digital messaging to those segments rather than to the broader electorate. Claims about the scope and effectiveness of CA's "psychographics" later drew scrutiny in the press and academia, and several reports disputed that such techniques uniquely determined outcomes in 2016.

In the United Kingdom, CA pitched services to the Leave.EU campaign in 2015–2016. Official inquiries later reported no evidence of a formal contract or paid engagement in the EU referendum. Public statements by Leave.EU figures and former CA staff described informal contacts. Andy Wigmore later said the firm's interest was pro bono because Nigel Farage was close to the Mercer family and Robert Mercer had introduced CA to Leave.EU. During the same period the Foreign Office sought advice from the firm, and Nix met Foreign Secretary Boris Johnson in 2016.

In February 2018 Nix told the Digital, Culture, Media and Sport Committee that CA had not received Facebook data. In March 2018 The New York Times and The Observer reported that CA had obtained Facebook user data from an external researcher who had told Facebook the collection was for academic purposes. Shortly afterwards Channel 4 News aired undercover footage in which Nix discussed potential opposition-research tactics, including bribery and "honey-trap" stings, and said the company "ran all of [Donald Trump's] digital campaign". Facebook said it had been deceived and suspended CA from advertising on its platform. CA suspended Nix the day after the Channel 4 broadcast and appointed Julian Wheatland as acting chief executive. On 23 March 2018 the UK Information Commissioner obtained a High Court warrant to search the company's London offices. In May 2018 the company announced that it would cease operations and enter insolvency.

=== Emerdata ===
Emerdata Ltd was incorporated on 11 August 2017 as a UK company linked to the SCL/Cambridge Analytica group. In 2018, Emerdata was reported as a potential holding or rebranding vehicle. In an April 2019 High Court judgment, it was identified as the group's ultimate holding company, with a majority stake held by the Delaware-registered Cambridge Analytica Holdings LLC and 21% held collectively by Alexander Nix, Julian Wheatland and Nigel Oakes. Nix joined the board on 23 January 2018 alongside SCL chair Julian Wheatland and Cambridge Analytica chief data officer Alexander Tayler; Rebekah and Jennifer Mercer were appointed on 16 March 2018. Nix resigned on 28 March 2018. It later entered administration, a UK insolvency process.

=== Regulatory actions ===
In the United States, the Federal Trade Commission in 2019 announced and later granted final approval to a settlement with Alexander Nix and Aleksandr Kogan that imposed conduct restrictions and required the deletion of data collected for Cambridge Analytica.

In the United Kingdom, SCL Elections Ltd, Cambridge Analytica's UK affiliate, was fined in January 2019 for failing to comply with an ICO enforcement notice issued after a subject access request by U.S. academic David Carroll. The following year, the Secretary of State accepted Nix's disqualification undertaking (effective 5 October 2020), imposing a seven-year ban on acting as a director or, without court permission, taking part in the promotion, formation or management of any UK company. The Insolvency Service said that, within the undertaking, Nix did not dispute that SCL Elections or associated companies marketed "potentially unethical services", and its chief investigator, Mark Bruce, said the agency had concluded that SCL Elections had "repeatedly offered shady political services to potential clients over a number of years." Nix said he made no admission of wrongdoing.

== In popular culture ==
Nix appears in the Netflix documentary The Great Hack (2019) through archival news footage and public testimony. The film was nominated for the Primetime Emmy Award for Outstanding Documentary or Nonfiction Special (2020).

In March 2020, it was reported that Paul Bettany was set to portray Nix in a planned feature film about the Cambridge Analytica affair, to be produced by Joe and Anthony Russo with a script by Christopher Markus and Stephen McFeely. The project, later linked to director Peter Farrelly, did not move forward and remains unproduced.

== See also ==
- Foreign electoral intervention
- Facebook–Cambridge Analytica data scandal
