= Nigel Oakes =

British businessman (born 1962)

- Born: Nigel John Oakes; July 1962 (age 63)
- Education: Eton
- Occupation: Businessman
- Title: Founder and CEO of SCL Group
- Parent: Major John Waddington Oakes
- Relatives: Alexander Waddington Oakes

Nigel John Oakes (born July 1962) is a British businessman, and the founder and CEO of Behavioural Dynamics Institute and SCL Group (formerly Strategic Communication Laboratories), the parent company of Cambridge Analytica and her sister AggregateIQ; the companies became known to a wider audience as a result of the Facebook–Cambridge Analytica data scandal involving the misuse of data. From the early 1990s, Oakes' companies, operating under succession of names, were involved in influencing elections in developing countries with Oakes leaving Indonesia in 2000 amidst a controversy over his work for the Indonesian government. Oakes first became known as the boyfriend of Lady Helen Windsor in the 1980s.

== Early life ==
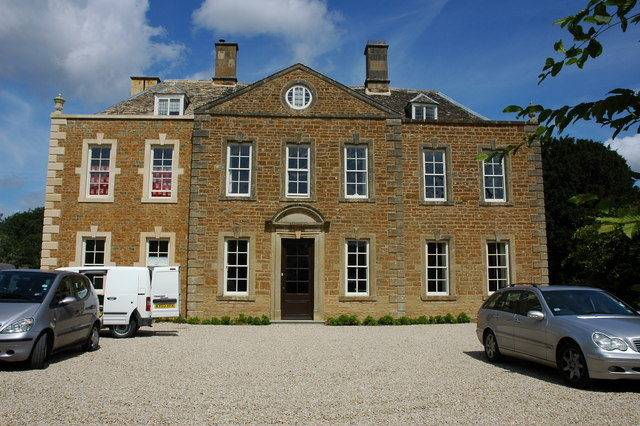
Whichford House, a grade II* listed house bought by his father John Waddington Oakes in the 1980s

Nigel Oakes was born in July 1962, the son of Major John Waddington Oakes, who was High Sheriff of Warwickshire in 1996. His father bought Whichford House in Whichford, Warwickshire in the 1980s. His great-grandfather was the Reverend Beilby Porteus Oakes, a descendant of the bishop Beilby Porteus. The family belonged to the English landed gentry. He attended Eton College. He claimed on the now defunct SCL website to have studied psychology at University College London (UCL), but a university spokesman said they have no record of this, and Alexander Nix (a director of SCL) said Oakes attended UCL "in a private capacity."

Nigel Oakes' brother Alexander Waddington Oakes was also an executive with SCL Group/Cambridge Analytica.

== Career ==
Oakes ran a mobile disco, before working in advertising for Saatchi & Saatchi.

In 1992, Oakes talked to a trade journal about his work: "We use the same techniques as Aristotle and Hitler ... We appeal to people on an emotional level to get them to agree on a functional level."

In 2000, his company Behavioural Dynamics Institute was based in Jakarta, Indonesia, where he worked as an image consultant to President Abdurrahman Wahid, who was facing financial misconduct allegations.

In 2005, Oakes co-founded the London-based SCL Group (formerly Strategic Communication Laboratories), along with his younger brother Alexander Oakes and Alexander Nix, described as a polo playboy whose father Paul David Ashburner Nix also became an investor in the company.

In 2013, SCL established Cambridge Analytica, a subsidiary aiming to target the American elections market and led by fellow Old Etonian Alexander Nix, a director of SCL for 14 years. The company was engaged by the Ted Cruz and Donald Trump campaigns during the 2016 US presidential election, and reportedly also worked on dozens of other elections in the U.S. during its existence. The company went bankrupt in 2018 following the Facebook–Cambridge Analytica data scandal. Cambridge Analytica claimed to use honey traps, bribery stings, and prostitutes, among other tactics, to influence more than 200 elections globally for its clients.

== Personal life ==
Oakes was the second "serious boyfriend" of Lady Helen Windsor, and "appalled the Queen" after she smuggled him into her parents' grace-and-favour home, York House, St James's Palace.
