= Caucus services bureau =

A caucus services bureau is a quasi-partisan legislative office of the Legislative Assembly of Ontario that services members of Provincial Parliament (MPPs). Each officially recognized political party in the legislature has a similar service bureau. Appropriations for caucuses are set out in section 73 of the Legislative Assembly Act.

== Role ==
Legislative office service bureaus are unique within the Ontario Government in that they operate as quasi-partisan entities, distributing communications material with their party's respective logos (Pursuant to the Government Advertising Act, 2004, a government office cannot publish, display, broadcast, or distribute a reviewable item that is deemed to be partisan). Although service bureaus are not required to brand their communications material with partisan logos they are expressly forbidden from using a Government of Ontario logo on material that could be considered to promote the party in power, or its members or negatively depict those who oppose the government.

== Funding ==
Caucus appropriations are distributed to government and opposition parties proportionate to how many seats in the legislature they hold, and are intended for research, communication and administrative services. Payments to an individual or company that total more than $50,000 in any given fiscal year are listed with Ontario's public accounts. Service bureaus are not subject to freedom-of-information rules.

== Current caucus service bureaus ==
Party	Party status	
Progressive Conservative	Government	https://www.pccaucusservices.ca
New Democratic	Official Opposition	https://www.ondpcaucus.com/
Liberal	Third party	https://ontarioliberal.ca/liberal-mpps/
