= Cambridge Analytica =

2013–2018 British political consulting firm

Cambridge Analytica Ltd.
- Type: Subsidiary
- Founded: 2013; 13 years ago
- Founder: Nigel Oakes; Alexander Nix; Alexander Oakes
- Defunct: May 1, 2018; 8 years ago
- Successor: Emerdata
- Headquarters: London, England
- Key people: Alexander Nix (CEO); Julian Wheatland (CEO); Robert Mercer (investor); Rebekah Mercer (investor); Steve Bannon (vice president, former)
- Parent: SCL Group
- Website: cambridgeanalytica.org at the Wayback Machine (archived 2017-07-10)

Cambridge Analytica Ltd. (CA), previously known as SCL USA, was a British political consulting firm that came to prominence through the Facebook–Cambridge Analytica data scandal. It was founded in 2013, as a subsidiary of the private intelligence company and self-described "global election management agency" SCL Group by long-time SCL executives Nigel Oakes, Alexander Nix and Alexander Oakes, with Nix as CEO.

Cambridge Analytica was hired by a variety of political actors, including the Trinidadian government in 2010 and the 2016 presidential campaigns of Ted Cruz and Donald Trump. The firm maintained offices in London, New York City, and Washington, D.C. The company closed operations in 2018 due to backlash from the data scandal. Some firms related to both Cambridge Analytica and its parent firm SCL still exist, although the UK firm Cambridge Analytica (UK) Limited is now dissolved.

== History ==
Cambridge Analytica was founded in 2013 as a subsidiary of the private intelligence company SCL Group, which describes itself as providing "data, analytics and strategy to governments and military organisations worldwide". The company was part of "an international web of companies" headed by the London-based SCL Group. Cambridge Analytica (SCL USA) was incorporated in January 2013 with its registered office being in Westferry Circus, London and consisting of just one staff member, director and CEO Alexander Nix (also appointed in January 2015). Nix was also the director of nine similar companies sharing the same registered offices in London, including Firecrest technologies, Emerdata and six SCL Group companies including "SCL elections limited".

Nigel Oakes, known as the former boyfriend of Lady Helen Windsor, had founded the predecessor SCL Group in the 1990s, and in 2005 Oakes established SCL Group together with his brother Alexander Oakes and Alexander Nix; SCL Group was the parent company of Cambridge Analytica. Former Conservative minister and MP Sir Geoffrey Pattie was the founding chairman of SCL; Lord Ivar Mountbatten also joined Oakes as a director of the company. As a result of the Facebook–Cambridge Analytica data scandal, Nix was removed as CEO and replaced by Julian Wheatland before the company closed. Several of the company's executives were Old Etonians.

The company's owners included several of the Conservative Party's largest donors such as billionaire Vincent Tchenguiz, former British Conservative minister Jonathan Marland, Baron Marland and the family of American hedge fund manager Robert Mercer. The company combined misappropriation of digital assets, data mining, data brokerage, and data analysis with strategic communication during electoral processes. While its parent SCL had focused on influencing elections in developing countries since the 1990s, Cambridge Analytica focused more on the western world, including the United Kingdom and the United States; CEO Alexander Nix has said CA was involved in 44 U.S. political races in 2014. In 2015, CA performed data analysis services for Ted Cruz's presidential campaign. In 2016, CA worked for Donald Trump's presidential campaign as well as for Leave.EU (one of the organisations campaigning in the United Kingdom's referendum on European Union membership). CA's role in those campaigns has been controversial and is the subject of ongoing inquiries in both countries. Political scientists question CA's claims about the effectiveness of its methods of targeting voters.

== Data scandal ==
In March 2018, media outlets broke news of Cambridge Analytica's business practices. The New York Times and The Observer reported that the company had acquired and used personal data about Facebook users from an external researcher who had told Facebook he was collecting it for academic purposes. Shortly afterwards, Channel 4 News aired undercover investigative videos showing Nix boasting about using prostitutes, bribery sting operations, and honey traps to discredit politicians on whom it had conducted opposition research, and saying that the company "ran all of (Donald Trump's) digital campaign". In response to the media reports, the Information Commissioner's Office (ICO) of the UK pursued a warrant to search the company's servers. Facebook banned Cambridge Analytica from advertising on its platform, saying that it had been deceived. On 23 March 2018, the British High Court granted the ICO a warrant to search Cambridge Analytica's London offices. As a result, Nix was suspended as CEO and replaced by Julian Wheatland.

The personal data of up to 87 million Facebook users were acquired via the 270,000 Facebook users who used a Facebook app created by Aleksandr Kogan called "This Is Your Digital Life". This was a personality profiling app and asked simple personality questions similar to other Facebook quizzes. Kogan was a scientist and psychologist employed as a lecturer at the University of Cambridge from 2012 to 2018. Alexander Nix claimed they had close to five thousand data points on each person who participated. They also gathered information through other data brokers ending with them acquiring millions of data points from American citizens.

Kogan's app used a feature of Facebook's Graph API (version 1.0), which permitted any third-party app to access not only the app user's data, but also the full profile data of all of that user's Facebook friends, without those friends' knowledge or consent. This platform-wide design was available to all developers and was used by tens of thousands of apps; Facebook CEO Mark Zuckerberg later told the House Energy and Commerce Committee that the company was auditing "tens of thousands" of apps that had had access to large amounts of user data. Because the average Facebook user at the time had approximately 300 friends, the 270,000 users who installed Kogan's app yielded data on up to 87 million people. Facebook deprecated the friends-data API in April 2014 and shut it down entirely in April 2015, but data already collected by apps remained in developers' possession. Kogan passed this data to Cambridge Analytica, breaching Facebook's terms of service.

On 1 May 2018, Cambridge Analytica and its parent company SCL filed for insolvency proceedings and closed operations. Alexander Tayler, a former director for Cambridge Analytica, was appointed director of Emerdata on 28 March 2018. Rebekah Mercer, Jennifer Mercer, Alexander Nix and Johnson Chun Shun Ko, who has links to American businessman Erik Prince, are in leadership positions at Emerdata. The Russo brothers are producing an upcoming film on Cambridge Analytica. In 2019 the Federal Trade Commission filed an administrative complaint against Cambridge Analytica for misuse of data. In 2020, the British Information Commissioner's Office closed a three-year inquiry into the company, concluded that Cambridge Analytica was "not involved" in the 2016 Brexit referendum and found no additional evidence for Russia's alleged interference during the campaign. US sensitive polling and election data, however, were passed to Russian Intelligence via a Cambridge Analytica contractor Sam Patten, Trump campaign manager Paul Manafort, and Russian agent Konstantin Kilimnik, who was indicted during the affair.

Publicly, parent company SCL Group called itself a "global election management agency", Politico reported it was known for involvement "in military disinformation campaigns to social media branding and voter targeting". SCL gained work on a large number of campaigns for the US and UK governments' war on terror advancing their model of behavioral conflict during the 2000s. SCL's involvement in the political world has been primarily in the developing world where it has been used by the military and politicians to study and manipulate public opinion and political will. Slate writer Sharon Weinberger compared one of SCL's hypothetical test scenarios to fomenting a coup.

Among the investors in Cambridge Analytica were some of the Conservative Party's largest donors such as billionaire Vincent Tchenguiz, former Conservative minister Jonathan Marland, Baron Marland, Roger Gabb, the family of American hedge fund manager Robert Mercer, and Steve Bannon. A minimum of 15 million dollars has been invested into the company by Mercer, according to The New York Times. Bannon's stake in the company was estimated at 1 to 5 million dollars, but he divested his holdings in April 2017 as required by his role as White House Chief Strategist. In March 2018, Jennifer Mercer and Rebekah Mercer became directors of Emerdata limited. In March 2018 it became public by Christopher Wylie, that Cambridge Analytica's first activities were founded on a data set, which its parent company SCL bought 2014 from a company named Global Science Research founded by Aleksandr Kogan and his team present across the world who worked as a psychologist at Cambridge. During Boris Johnson's tenure as foreign secretary, the Foreign Office sought advice from Cambridge Analytica and Johnson had a meeting with Alexander Nix in 2016.

Emma Briant, an academic at the University of Essex, had researched the firm and the parent company SCL, interviewing employees as part of her research on political propaganda and her 2015 book Propaganda and Counter-Terrorism. During the revelations she published evidence through the British Parliament's Fake News Inquiry indicating that Cambridge Analytica did work for the UK's LeaveEU Brexit campaign during the 2016 EU Referendum which they denied. The Information Commissioner's Office decided in February 2019 to audit the campaign, and its funder Arron Banks company Eldon Insurance for unlawful marketing involving repurposing of data. In November 2020, the Information Commissioner Elizabeth Denham wrote that she "found no further evidence to change [her] earlier view that SCL/CA were not involved in the EU referendum campaign in the UK." She also said she found no evidence of Russian involvement in the referendum.

=== Aftermath ===
Following the downfall of Cambridge Analytica, a number of companies have been established by executives who had also been involved with Cambridge Analytica. In July 2018, several former Cambridge Analytica staff launched Auspex International, a company intended to influence politics and society in Africa and the Middle East; another company called Emerdata also had substantial overlap with Cambridge Analytica. According to the Associated Press, Data Propria, a data analysis firm launched May 2018, is run by former officials at Cambridge Analytica.

A firm called Emic, set up by staff from the original SCL defence contractor were revealed in 2020 by Emma Briant to be continuing to work for governments.

In December 2022, Facebook's owner Meta Platforms agreed to pay $725 million to settle a class-action lawsuit that alleged the company improperly shared users' information with Cambridge Analytica.

In July 2026, Futurism reported that the Cambridge Analytica website was live again, with apparently different users and consisting primarily of AI slop.

== Methods ==
Today in the United States we have somewhere close to four or five thousand data points on every individual ... So we model the personality of every adult across the United States, some 230 million people.

— Alexander Nix, chief executive of Cambridge Analytica, October 2016.

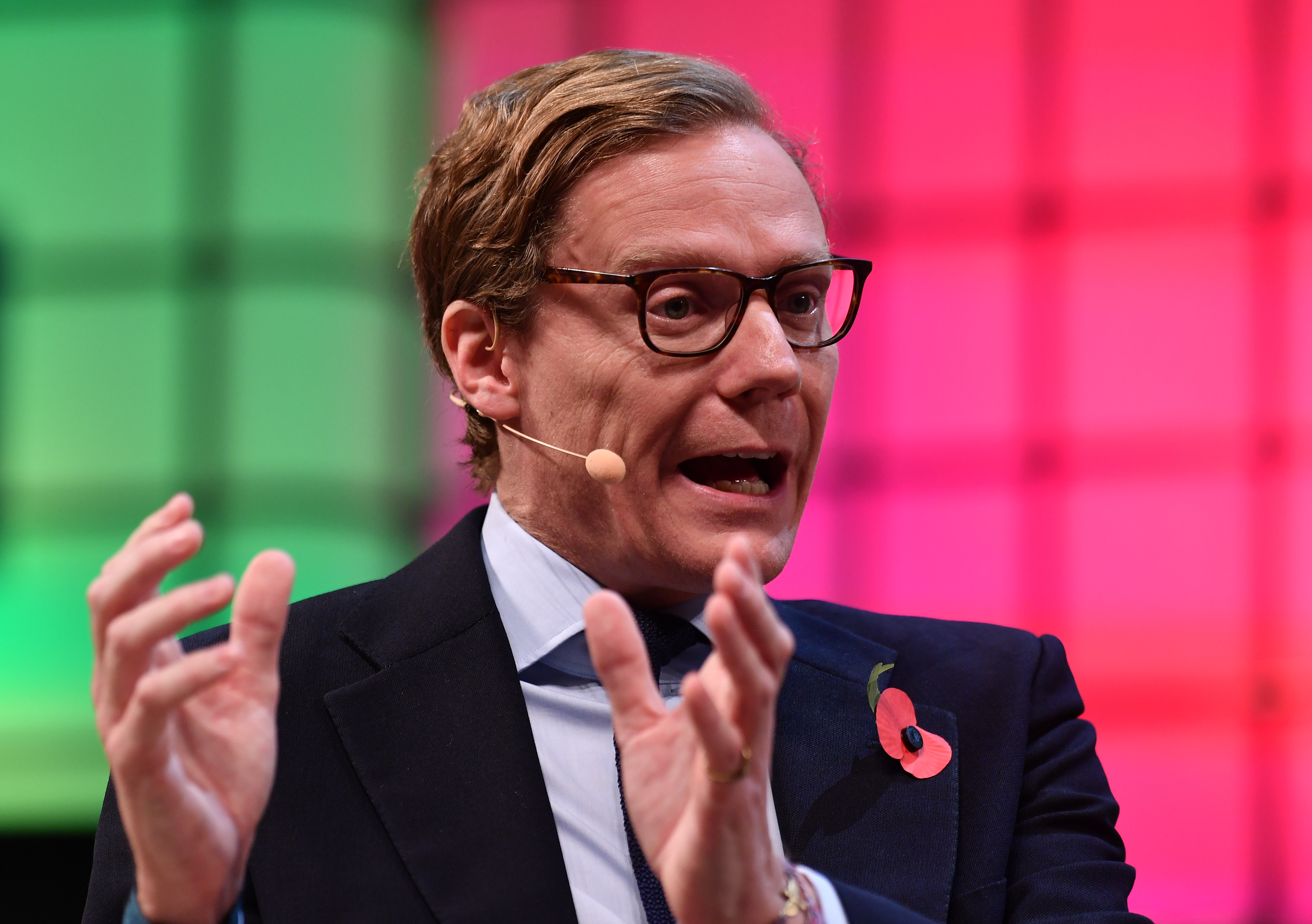
Cambridge Analytica CEO Alexander Nix speaking in November 2017

CA's approach comprised three steps. First, they built a machine learning model to predict individuals' Big Five personality traits from their Facebook Likes. The model was trained on data from approximately 200,000 U.S. participants, recruited through Qualtrics, who were each paid $4 to complete a personality questionnaire and share their Facebook profiles. Another source of information was the "Cruz Crew" mobile app that tracked physical movements and contacts and according to the Associated Press, invaded personal data more than previous presidential campaign apps. Second, the company applied this model to infer the personality profiles of millions of Americans. At the time, Facebook allowed apps to access not only a user's data but also the data of all their Facebook friends; through this mechanism, the 200,000 recruited participants gave the company access to the Facebook profiles of over 100 million Americans. Third, Cambridge Analytica used voters' inferred personality profiles to target them with personalized political ads disseminated through social media, email, and direct canvassing — tailoring messages to resonate with different personality types.

CA's approach was based on methods originally patented by Facebook in 2012. While Facebook did not publicly disclose the accuracy of its methods, it was studied by independent researchers. Michal Kosinski and colleagues at the University of Cambridge demonstrated that Facebook's methods could predict personality, political views, sexual orientation, and other personal attributes with high accuracy from Facebook Likes alone. The authors warned that these capabilities could "prove dangerous for individuals," calling for transparency and user control over personal data. Research in fields such as psychology, marketing, and health communication has shown that interventions aimed at influencing and changing human behavior are most effective when they are tailored to individuals’ psychological states and traits. For example, Matz, Kosinski, Nave, and Stillwell conducted a study that reached 3.5 million Facebook users, and found that advertisements tailored to recipients' personality profiles extracted from their Facebook Likes boosted sales by about 50%.

CA derived much of its personality data via online surveys which it conducted on an ongoing basis. For each political client, the firm would narrow voter segments from 32 different personality styles it attributed to every adult in the United States. The personality data would inform the tone of the language used in ad messages or voter contact scripts, while additional data was used to determine voters' stances on particular issues.

The data would get updated with monthly surveys, asking about political preferences and how people get the information they use to make decisions. It also covered consumer topics about different brands and preferred products, building up an image of how someone shops as much as how they vote.

=== Channel 4 News investigation ===
Channel 4 News, a news programme broadcast by the British public service Channel 4, conducted a four-month investigation into Cambridge Analytica starting in November 2017. An undercover reporter posed as a potential customer for Cambridge Analytica, hoping to help Sri Lankan candidates get elected. Video footage from this operation was published on 19 March 2018. From the footage, Cambridge Analytica executives say they worked on over 200 elections across the world. Alexander Nix was recorded in this investigation, talking "unguardedly about the company's practices". Nix said that his company uses honey traps, bribery stings, and prostitutes, for opposition research. For example, Nix offered to discredit political opponents in Sri Lanka with suggestive videos using "beautiful Ukrainian girls" and offers of bribes, even if the opponents did not accept the offers. He also said he uses "Israeli companies" to entrap political opponents with bribes and sex, the Wall Street Journal confirmed that it was referring to Psy-Group. Zamel signed a memorandum of understanding for Psy-Group with Cambridge Analytica on 14 December 2016.

Cambridge Analytica said that the video footage was "edited and scripted to grossly misrepresent" the recorded conversations and company's business practices. Nix said that he had "entertained a series of ludicrous hypothetical scenarios", but insisted his company does not engage in entrapment or bribery.

In the third part of the series, Nix also said that Cambridge Analytica "ran all the digital campaign" for Trump. Nix stated they used communications that would be self-destructive, leaving no incriminating evidence. After the news segment was broadcast, the board of Cambridge Analytica suspended Nix as chief executive officer, and Julian Wheatland became the new CEO. The company also released a statement that the allegations did not represent the ethics of the company, and an independent entity would investigate Nix's statements.

The investigation also raised questions regarding campaign finance law. During the 2016 election, the company was employed both by Trump's campaign and Robert Mercer's Make America Number 1 Super PAC which supported Trump. While PACs are not limited in the amount of funds they can spend on behalf of a candidate, they are not allowed to coordinate strategy with the campaigns they are supporting. Nix's statements in the recorded video describe how the Trump campaign itself could "take the high road" and "stay clean", while the negative attacks were handled by the firm and the Super PAC, in a way which makes it "unattributable, untrackable". These statements potentially suggested unlawful coordination between Trump's campaign and the PAC, although Cambridge Analytica has denied this.

=== Assessment of impact ===
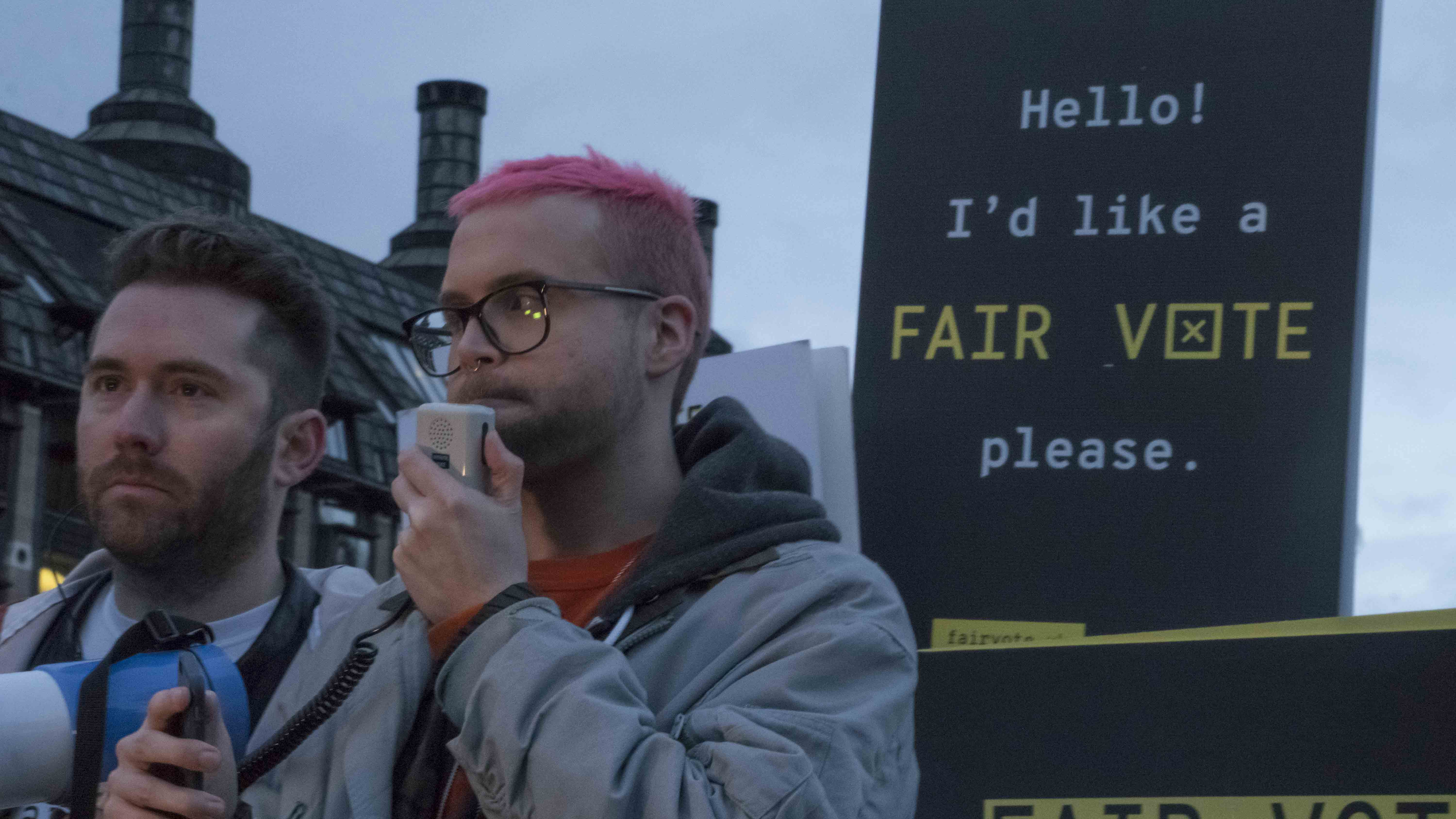
Canadian whistleblower Christopher Wylie who was the former director of research at Cambridge Analytica

Some political scientists have been skeptical of claims made by Cambridge Analytica about the effectiveness of its microtargeting of voters. They believe that access to digital data doesn't provide significantly more information than from public voter databases, and the digital data has limited value over time as the preferences of voters change. While studies have shown that personality does impact political preferences, some political scientists still believe that it is hard to infer political values from personality traits. On the other hand, a paper by Stanford professor Michal Kosinski and colleagues confirms that it can have a significant impact with a sample base of 3.5 million users

Research discussed by Brendan Nyhan of Dartmouth College showed that it is extremely hard to alter voters' choice of candidate because many likely voters are already committed partisans; rather, it is easier to mobilize partisan voters. This is consistent with Wylie's claims that CA aimed to activate voters who typically abstained but were identified as likely supporters of CA's various employers, and to suppress voters likely to vote for opponents. Tufts University political scientist Eitan Hersh, who has published on microtargeting in campaigns, has expressed strong skepticism about Cambridge Analytica's methods and their purported effectiveness, saying, "Every claim about psychographics etc made by or about [Cambridge Analytica] is BS."

In 2017, CA claimed that it has psychological profiles of 220 million US citizens based on 5,000 separate data sets. In March 2017, The New York Times reported that CA had exaggerated its capabilities: "Cambridge executives now concede that the company never used psychographics in the Trump campaign." Trump aides have also disputed CA's role in the campaign, describing it as "modest" and noting that none of the company's efforts involved psychographics.

According to an aide and consultant for Ted Cruz's presidential campaign, their campaign stopped using CA after its psychographic models failed to identify likely Cruz supporters. The Cruz campaign ceased access to all of Cambridge's data after the South Carolina Republican primary on 20 February 2016 when Cruz came in third after Trump and Rubio.

=== Privacy issues and investigations ===
The use of personal data collected without knowledge or permission to establish sophisticated models of users' personalities raises ethical and privacy issues. CA operated out of the United States; its operations would be illegal in Europe with its stricter privacy laws. While Cruz was outspoken about protecting personal information from the government, his database of CA has been described as "political-voter surveillance".

Regarding CA's use of Facebook users, a speaker for CA indicated that these users gave permission when signing up with the provider, while Facebook declared that "misleading people or misusing information" is in violation of Facebook's policies. In 2015, Facebook indicated that it was investigating the matter. In March 2018, Facebook announced that it had suspended the accounts of Strategic Communication Laboratories for failing to delete data on Facebook users that had been improperly collected.

Alexander Nix suggested that data collection and microtargeting benefits the voters – because they receive messages about issues they care about. However, digital rights protection groups raised concerns that private information is collected, stored, and shared while individuals are "left in the dark about [it]" and have no control.

Significant backlash against Facebook came to light in March 2018, resulting in controversy as well as a $37 billion (~$46.7 billion in 2025) drop in the market capitalization of Facebook, as of 20 March. Due to the scandal of enabling monetization of Facebook personal data, one assessment was that only 41% of Facebook users trust the company. On 26 March, the US Federal Trade Commission announced it is "conducting an open investigation of Facebook Inc's privacy practices following the disclosure that 50 million users' data got into the hands of political consultancy Cambridge Analytica." In March 2019 Facebook acknowledged it had concerns about “improper data-gathering practices” by CA, months before the previously reported onset-of-alert at December 2015. In December 2019, the Federal Trade Commission filed an administrative complaint against Cambridge Analytica, finding that the company had engaged in deceptive practices. The FTC also reached separate consent orders with CEO Alexander Nix and app developer Aleksandr Kogan, each imposing 20-year restrictions on their business practices and requiring deletion of all improperly collected data, including any derived algorithms or models. In January 2016, Facebook had received signed certifications from Nix and Kogan stating that all harvested data had been deleted. However, the data was never actually destroyed; The New York Times viewed extant samples in March 2018, and Wylie confirmed that copies persisted on company servers.

In July 2019, the Federal Trade Commission imposed a $5 billion penalty on Facebook — the largest privacy-related fine in US history — for violating its 2012 consent decree regarding user privacy, approved in a 3–2 vote. The complaint alleged that Facebook's privacy settings had falsely claimed to let users restrict sharing to "Only Friends" while still exposing their data to third-party apps installed by their friends; that Facebook had failed to screen developers or their apps before granting access to vast amounts of user data; that it had turned on facial recognition by default while claiming users could control it; and that it had collected phone numbers for two-factor authentication but used them for advertising without disclosure. The settlement included a 20-year consent decree, creation of an independent Privacy Committee on Facebook's board of directors, and a requirement that Facebook obtain affirmative consent before using facial recognition. Dissenting Commissioner Rohit Chopra argued the deal "places no meaningful restrictions on Facebook's ability to collect, share, and use personal information"; Commissioner Rebecca Slaughter argued the FTC should have initiated litigation against CEO Mark Zuckerberg personally.

In 2020 the BBC reported that the group Facebook You Owe Us had filed a lawsuit against Facebook for failing to protect users' personal data in the Cambridge Analytica breach, involving the misuse of information from almost one million users in England and Wales.

== Elections ==
=== Australia ===
In Australia, Cambridge Analytica set up an office. Allan Lorraine, a friend of Alexander Tayler who was a former director for Cambridge Analytica and later appointed director of Emerdata, set up SCL (the parent company of Cambridge Analytica) in Australia. Representatives of Cambridge Analytica had a private dinner with Dan Tehan when he was then the minister responsible for cyber security, and Liberal Party executives. The business name "Cambridge Analytica" was registered in Australia to the Lorraine Family Trust in June 2015. SCL Group, promoted Mr Lorraine online as its head of Australian operations. Alexander Nix spoke at an Australian data-driven advertising conference run by the Association for Data-driven Marketing and Advertising and met with Liberal Party officials. Cambridge Analytica was scoping both political as well as commercial work in Australia. Cambridge Analytica's managing director of political operations said in a video recorded by Channel 4 that "We've done it in Mexico, we've done it in Malaysia, we're now moving into Brazil, Australia, China."

More than 310,000 Australian Facebook users were among the millions globally who may have had their information improperly shared with Cambridge Analytica, to be sold and used for political profiling.

=== India ===
Cambridge Analytica functioned in India through a company called Strategic Communication Laboratories Private Limited, a venture of its parent company based in London, the SCL Group, and Ovleno India. Christopher Wylie, the CA whistleblower, tweeted documents that suggested that SCL India had been involved in at least six state elections in 2003–2012, including the 2010 state elections in Bihar, as well as the 2009 national election. He also suggested that CA's role in Indian elections was neocolonial in nature. Both leading national parties, the Bharatiya Janata Party (BJP) and the Indian National Congress (INC) denied contracting SCL India for any elections, and each accused the other party of having hired the firm. An INC spokesperson admitted that it was possible that party leaders might have merely met with the firm—yet, the SCL website listed their 2009 Bihar election campaign in its display of past projects. A clip from a BBC documentary showing a poster of the INC in ex-CEO Alexander Nix's office went viral in India. However, some CA executives, including Nix, claimed that their business venture in India was unsuccessful and that they falsified claims about their projects to win other business contracts. Further, one of the co-founders of the Indian CA counterpart, Avneesh Rai, claimed that Wylie's documents were some of the corporate advertising created by Nix and others that displayed the independent work of Rai and others as CA projects. Rai further claimed that several of Wylie's claims were false, and alleged that his partners and contractors held an anti-INC party ideological bent. In early 2018, CA pitched a 50-page proposal potentially costing INR 25 million for the INC campaign in the upcoming 2019 general election in India and "crucial" state elections, but the INC maintained that no transaction was made.

India was in the list of ten most-affected countries in the 2018 Cambridge Analytica data leak. 335 Indian Facebook users installed a CA associated app, exposing the data of their friend networks—in total leaking the data of 562,455 users. After the data leak allegations became public, the Indian government took down the local website of SCL India and began formal investigations.

=== Kenya ===
CA ran campaigns in secret during Kenya's 2013 and 2017 elections. In 2018, a CA employee said that his predecessor at the company had been found dead in his hotel room in Kenya while working on Uhuru Kenyatta's 2013 campaign. The company claimed on its website to have conducted a survey of 47,000 Kenyans during the 2013 elections in order to understand "key national and local political issues, levels of trust in key politicians, voting behaviours/intentions, and preferred information channels". According to verified sources, CA worked with 360 Media, a company formed by Simon Gicharu (founder of Mount Kenya University) and Tom Mshindi (Editor-in-Chief of Nation Media Group). 360 Media developed online campaigns in the 2017 Kenyan elections portraying "Raila Odinga as a blood-thirsty individual who is also sympathetic to Al-Shabaab and having no development agenda," whilst portraying the incumbent President Kenyatta as "tough on terrorism, and being good for the economy."

After the revelations in March 2018, where CA staff boasted of their power in Kenya, opposition figures called for an investigation. Norman Magaya, an official of the National Super Alliance, accused CA and the ruling Jubilee Party of committing a crime and called for an investigation. The Jubilee Party downplayed CA's role, saying it had hired the firm's parent company, to assist with branding.

=== Malta ===
In its Disinformation and 'fake news' inquiry, published on 29 July 2018, the UK Parliament's Digital, Culture, Media and Sport Committee noted that it is believed that CA, or its associated companies, worked with the Labour Party in Malta, on the 2013 Maltese general election campaign. Several sources claim that CA had close relationships with Henley & Partners who would immediately after the election introduce and run a lucrative Citizenship by Investment Program in Malta. The Maltese Government issued a press release denying the claims and calling the report and its sources "fake news". Henley & Partners denied any wrongdoing. According to Henley & Partners, there was never a formal working relationship with CA.

The Final Report by the UK Parliament's Digital, Culture, Media and Sport Committee, published on 18 February 2019, took note of the Maltese Government's submissions (including through PR agency Chelgate's services) but determined that compelling evidence shown to the Committee confirmed that "SCL certainly had meetings in Malta, that Christian Kalin of Henley & Partners was introduced by SCL to Joseph Muscat in 2011, and that Christian Kalin met with both political parties before 2013".

The Maltese Government later issued a further denial decrying the use of "unnamed sources" and "confidential documents".

=== Mexico ===
After the Facebook–Cambridge Analytica data scandal, Forbes published that the British news program Channel 4 News had mentioned the existence of proof revealing ties between the Institutional Revolutionary Party (PRI) and Cambridge Analytica, suggesting a modus operandi similar to the one in the United States. According to Channel 4 News' Guillermo Galdos, CA worked for the PRI at least until January 2018. An investigation was requested.

In 2017 the company had reached out to the PRI, Mexico's ruling political party, in order to bolster the party's presidential campaign during the largest-ever political elections of 2018. The party decided that it was sufficiently equipped to mess with the election on its own, but still paid Cambridge Analytica to prevent it from working with rival parties.

=== United Kingdom ===
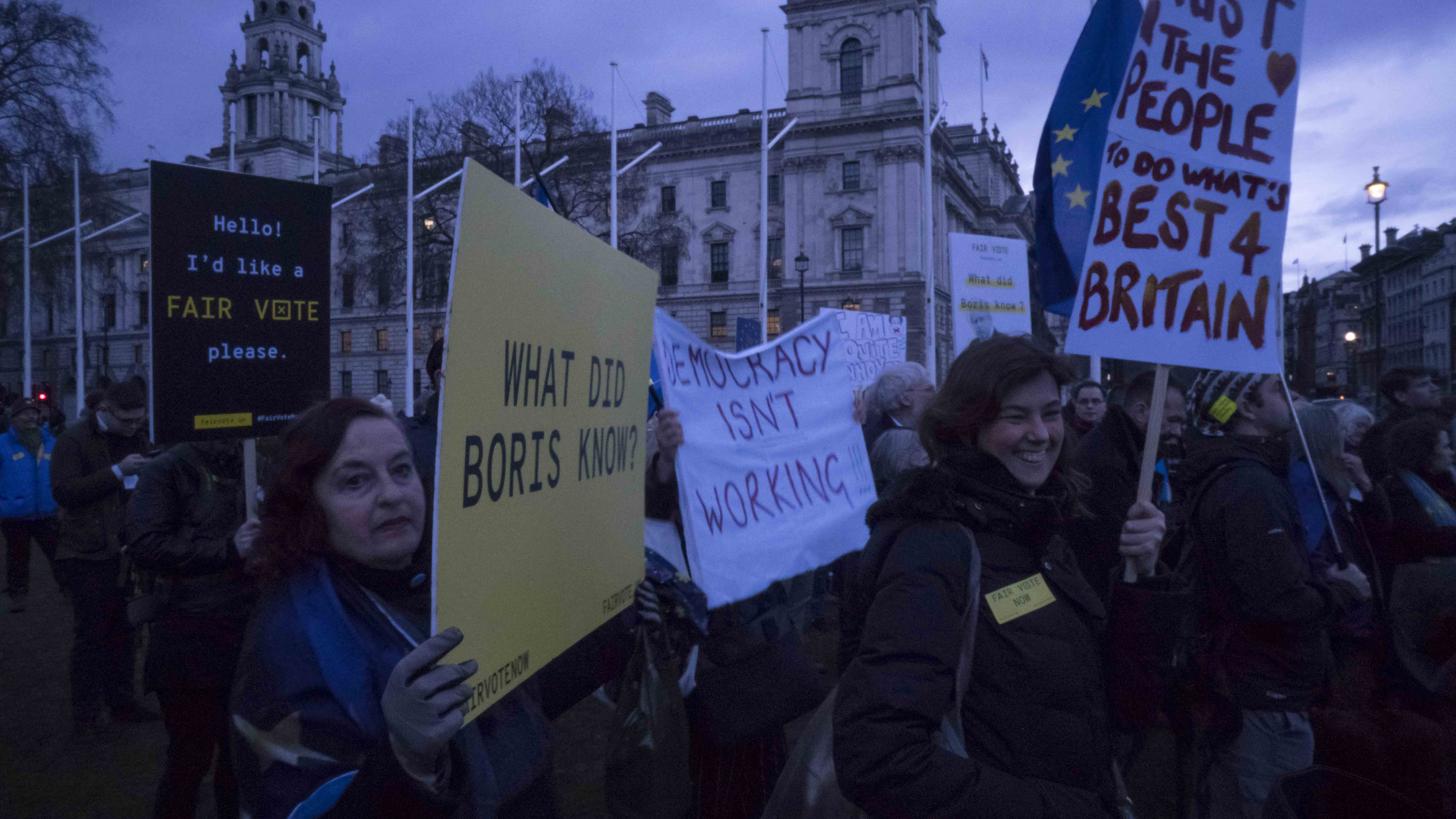
A protest following the Cambridge Analytica scandal, 29 March 2018

Many donors to the UK Conservative Party reportedly have connections to the parent company of Cambridge Analytica.

CA became involved in the 2016 United Kingdom European Union membership referendum (Brexit) supporting "persuadable" voters to vote for leaving the European Union (EU). Articles by Carole Cadwalladr in The Observer and Guardian newspapers, respectively published in February and May 2017, speculated in detail that CA had influenced both the Brexit/Vote Leave option in the UK's 2016 EU membership referendum and Trump's 2016 US presidential campaign with Robert Mercer's backing of Donald Trump being key. They also discuss the legality of using the social data farmed. CA is pursuing legal action over the claims made in Cadwalladr's articles.

No campaign contributions, in cash or in kind, by Cambridge Analytica were reported to the UK electoral authorities. Both CA and Leave.EU refused to comment on any donation of services. On 23 March 2018, it was reported that a former employee, Brittany Kaiser, who was the company's former director of business development, revealed that the company misled the public and MPs over its links with Leave.EU and the analysis of data which had been provided by the UK Independence Party (UKIP). She said she felt she had lied by supporting Cambridge Analytica's company line that it had done "no paid or unpaid work" for Leave.EU. "In my opinion, I was lying. In my opinion I felt like we should say, 'this is exactly what we did'". The following day, it was reported that the company claimed that it would be able to affect the outcome of the Referendum and that it had produced a 10-page document headed "Big Data Solutions for the EU Referendum", claiming it could single out 'Brexiteers' among voters, donors, politicians and journalists. In a 2019 interview with France 24, Kaiser said that democracy is under threat from the influence of groups like Cambridge Analytica, and that she does not believe social media users are more protected from this than in 2016.

During a committee hearing in March 2018 Christopher Wylie told UK lawmakers that AggregateIQ, a firm linked to Cambridge Analytica, helped the official Vote Leave campaign circumvent campaign financing laws during the Brexit referendum.

=== United States ===
Laurence Levy, a lawyer with the law firm Bracewell & Giuliani, advises Rebekah Mercer, Steve Bannon, and Alexander Nix on the legality of their company, Cambridge Analytica, being involved in Elections in the United States. He advises that Nix and any foreign nationals without a green card working for the company must not be involved in any decision making regarding any work the company performs for any clients related to U.S. elections. He further advises Nix to recuse himself from any involvement with the company's U.S. election work because he is not a U.S. citizen.

==== 2014 midterm elections ====
CA had entered the US market in 2012 (or 2013), and was involved in 44 US congressional, US Senate and state-level elections in the 2014 US elections.

The company worked with the John Bolton Super PAC (political action committee) on a major digital and TV campaign focused on senate races in Arkansas, North Carolina and New Hampshire and helped turn out voters for the Republican Party candidates in those states. Two of the Republican candidates backed by the Bolton Super PAC, Thom Tillis in North Carolina and Tom Cotton in Arkansas, won their Senate bids, while Scott Brown lost in New Hampshire. The PAC ran 15 different TV advertisements each in North Carolina and Arkansas and 17 in New Hampshire, mostly online with some targeted directly to households using Dish Network and DirecTV. All were intended to push Bolton's national security agenda.

CA also supported Thom Tillis's successful campaign to oust Kay Hagan as a senator for North Carolina. The firm was credited for its role in identifying a sizeable cluster of North Carolinians who prioritised foreign affairs, which encouraged Tillis to shift the conversation from state-level debates over education policy to charges that incumbent Kay Hagan had failed to take ISIS's rise seriously. Tillis's campaign and the North Carolina Republican Party paid Cambridge Analytica $345,000 for these services.

CA sent dozens of non-U.S. citizens to provide campaign strategy and messaging advice to Republican candidates in 2014, opening the firm and individuals to prosecution under the Foreign Agents Registration Act, for being foreign agents having not registered through the United States Department of Justice as such.

==== 2016 presidential election ====
CA's involvement in the 2016 Republican Party presidential primaries became known in July 2015. As of December 2015, CA claimed to have collected up to 5,000 data points on over 220 million Americans. At that time Robert Mercer was a major supporter of Ted Cruz. The Mercer family funded CA directly and indirectly through several super-PACs as well as through payments via Cruz's campaign.

Cruz became an early major client of CA in the 2016 presidential campaign. Just prior to the Iowa Republican caucuses, the Cruz campaign had spent $3 million for CA's services, with additional money coming from allied Super-PACs. After Cruz's win at the Iowa caucus CA was credited with having been able to identify and motivate potential voters. Ultimately the Cruz campaign spent $5.8 million on work by CA.

Ben Carson was a second client of CA; his campaign had paid $220,000 for "data management" and "web service" as reported in October 2015. Marco Rubio's campaign was supported by Optimus Consulting. Meanwhile, the third competitor, Governor John Kasich, was supported by rivalling firm Applecart.

After Cruz dropped out of the race for the Republican presidential nomination in May 2016, Robert Mercer and his daughter Rebekah Mercer started to support Trump. In August, it became known that CA followed their allegiance and worked for Trump's presidential campaign. Trump's campaign also worked with digital firm Giles Parscale. In September, the Trump campaign spent $5 million to purchase television advertising.

The Trump campaign used Cambridge Analytica during the primaries and in the summer of 2016, because it was uncertain if the Republican National Committee would share voter data. After Trump won the Republican nomination, data vendors, including Cambridge Analytica, submitted bids in September. However, in late September or early October, Jared Kushner and Brad Parscale decided to use just the RNC data for the general election, and not any data vendors' data, since at that point, it was clear that RNC would share data, and they found the RNC data "vastly more accurate" than data vendors' data.

In 2016, the company said that it had not used psychographics in the Trump presidential campaign. Cambridge Analytica targeted potential voters with bespoke messages. Cambridge Analytica's data head, Alexander Tayler said, "When you think about the fact that Donald Trump lost the popular vote by 3m votes but won the electoral college vote, [t]hat's down to the data and the research."

The head of Cambridge Analytica said he asked WikiLeaks founder, Julian Assange, for help finding Hillary Clinton's 33,000 deleted emails.

On 18 May 2017, Time reported that the US Congress was investigating CA in connection with Russian interference in the 2016 United States elections. The report alleges that CA may have coordinated the spread of Russian propaganda using its microtargeting capabilities. According to the Trump campaign's digital operations chief, CA worked "side-by-side" with representatives from Facebook, Alphabet Inc. and Twitter on Trump's digital campaign activities.

On 4 August 2017, Michael Flynn, who is under investigation by US counterintelligence for his contacts with Russian officials, amended a public financial filing to reflect that he had served in an advisory role in an agreement with CA during the 2016 Trump campaign.

On 8 October 2017, Brad Parscale, who was the digital media director for Trump's 2016 presidential campaign, stated in an interview with Lesley Stahl from CBS News on 60 Minutes that Parscale was able to utilize Facebook advertising to directly target individual voters in swing states. Parscale cited the example in which he was able to target specific universes (audiences) who care about infrastructure and promote Trump and his message to build back up the crumbling American infrastructure. Although he hired Cambridge Analytica to assist with microtargeting, and Cambridge Analytica stated that it was the key to Trump's victory, Parscale denied that he gained assistance from the firm, stating that he thought Cambridge Analytica's use of psychographics doesn't work. He also denied any assistance with links to Russia. According to Parscale, the Clinton campaign turned down assistance from these platforms.

On 25 October 2017, Assange said on Twitter that he had been approached by Cambridge Analytica, but that he had rejected its proposal. Assange's tweet followed a story in The Daily Beast alleging that Cambridge Analytica chief executive Alexander Nix had proposed a collaboration with Wikileaks to find the 33,000 emails that had been deleted from Clinton's private server. CNN said it had been told by several unnamed sources that Nix intended to turn the Clinton email archive released to the public by the State Department into a searchable database for the campaign or a pro-Trump political action committee.

On 14 December 2017, it was revealed that Robert Mueller had requested during the fall of 2017 that Cambridge Analytica turn over the emails of any of its employees who worked on the Trump campaign, as part of his investigation into Russian interference in the 2016 United States elections.

In 2018, following disclosures that the company had improperly used the personal information of over 50 million Facebook users while working on Trump's presidential campaign, The Times of Israel reported that the company had used what Nix had called "intelligence gathering" from British and Israeli companies as part of their efforts to influence the election results in Trump's favor.

This was further confirmed when a joint investigation by journalists from TheMarker, Radio France, and Haaretz into an organization that claimed to help swing elections. The business, reportedly run by Israeli businessman Tal Hanan, had connections with Cambridge Analytica and Alexander Nix. Hanan's name and pseudonym, Jorge, were discovered in leaked Cambridge Analytica emails.

=== Other countries ===
Cambridge Analytica's executives said in 2018 that the company had worked in more than 200 elections around the world, including in India, Pakistan, Thailand, Indonesia, Malaysia (CA's website stated that it supported Prime Minister Najib Razak's Barisan Nasional coalition), Colombia, Cyprus, Zambia, South Africa, Romania, Italy, Lithuania, Trinidad and Tobago, Nigeria (Nigeria's 2015 presidential election), the Czech Republic, and Argentina. During the investigation it was admitted that the company has been contacted from a famous Italian party to manage the electoral campaign in Italy, but the name of the party was not revealed.

In the Philippines, Cambridge Analytica was also involved in the 2016 presidential election with reports citing it helped Rodrigo Duterte win the race. Duterte's camp denied this association. The SCL Group, Cambridge Analytica's parent company, claimed that it rebranded the politician's image to target voters who they found are swayed by qualities such as toughness and decisiveness. During the election cycle, Facebook confirmed that its data of more one million Filipino users were improperly shared with the communications company.

In the Trinidad and Tobago 2010 general election, SCL ran a campaign called "Do So!" designed to suppress voter turnout among young Afro-Trinidadian voters, who were less likely to support SCL's client, the United National Congress (UNC). The campaign was disguised as a grassroots youth movement discouraging from voting as political protest, using graffiti, billboards, music videos, and social media. Funding came from Jack Warner, the former FIFA Vice President later indicted on corruption charges. A voice recording of Alexander Nix confirmed the ethnically targeted voter suppression strategy. Cambridge Analytica later boasted on its website of having helped elect Kamla Persad-Bissessar as Prime Minister.

In 2020, Brittany Kaiser alleged that former Philippine Senator Bongbong Marcos, son of the late dictator Ferdinand Marcos, had approached Cambridge Analytica with a request to do a "rebranding" of the family's image.

On 4 January 2020, a release of more than 100,000 documents showed how Cambridge Analytica worked in 68 countries, developing a global infrastructure designed to manipulate voters on an "industrial scale." The release of documents began on New Year's Day from an anonymous Twitter account called @HindsightFiles, that published material on elections in Malaysia, Kenya and Brazil (and next days so more countries). This documents came from Brittany Kaiser, an ex-Cambridge Analytica employee turned whistleblower, and were retrieved from her email accounts and hard drives.

== See also ==
- Auspex International
- Catalist
- Data dredging
- Data Propria
- Foreign electoral intervention
- Foreign worker
- The Great Hack
- The Groundwork
- Herd behaviour
- Mass surveillance
- ORCA (computer system)
- Predictive analytics
- Project Alamo
- Project Houdini
- Project Narwhal
- Right-wing politics
- Russian interference in the 2016 United States elections
- Sam Patten (political consultant)
- Social media analytics
- Tech companies in the New York metropolitan area
