= Indian National Congress campaign for the 2019 Indian general election =

Political campaign

- Campaign: 2019 Indian general election
- Affiliation: Indian National Congress
- Alliance: United Progressive Alliance
- Key people: Rahul Gandhi (Party President); Priyanka Vadra; Sonia Gandhi
- Website: www.inc.in

On 25 August 2018, Indian National Congress President Rahul Gandhi has constituted the Core Group Committee, Manifesto Committee and Publicity Committee for the upcoming 2019 Indian general election.

== Slogans ==
=== 'Ab Hoga Nyay' ===
Congress on Sunday 7 April 2019 launched its Lok Sabha campaign slogan 'Ab Hoga Nyay' (Now, There Will be Justice) by weaving a narrative around the "injustice" meted out to countrymen and "atmosphere of despair" prevailing in the country during the Narendra Modi government.

=== Chowkidar Chor Hai ===
Chowkidar Chor Hai (Hindi: चौकीदार चोर है। is a Hindi slogan used by the Indian National Congress in its campaign for the 2019 Indian general election. The slogan was coined by the Congress' Prime Ministerial candidate Rahul Gandhi as a slogan against Narendra Modi, with the intention of conveying that the person who was entrusted with safeguarding public money was in fact a thief.

== Manifesto ==
The Congress Party manifesto can be found here: Congress Manifesto 2019

== Results ==
| State | Total Seats | Seats Won | Seat Change |
|---|---|---|---|
| Andaman & Nicobar Islands (UT) | 1 | 1 | ▲1 |
| Andhra Pradesh | 42 | 0 | Steady |
| Arunachal Pradesh | 2 | 0 | ▼1 |
| Assam | 14 | 3 | Steady |
| Bihar | 40 | 1 | ▼1 |
| Chandigarh (UT) | 1 | 0 | Steady |
| Chhattisgarh | 11 | 2 | ▲1 |
| Dadra & Nagar Haveli (UT) | 1 | 1 | Steady |
| Daman & Diu (UT) | 1 | 1 | Steady |
| Goa | 2 | 1 | ▲1 |
| Gujarat | 26 | 0 | Steady |
| Haryana | 10 | 0 | ▼1 |
| Himachal Pradesh | 4 | 0 | Steady |
| Jammu & Kashmir | 6 | 0 | Steady |
| Jharkhand | 14 | 1 | ▲1 |
| Karnataka | 28 | 1 | ▼8 |
| Kerala | 20 | 15 | ▲7 |
| Lakshadweep (UT) | 1 | 0 | Steady |
| Madhya Pradesh | 29 | 1 | ▼1 |
| Maharashtra | 48 | 1 | ▼1 |
| Manipur | 2 | 2 | ▼2 |
| Meghalaya | 2 | 1 | Steady |
| Mizoram | 1 | 0 | ▼1 |
| Nagaland | 1 | 0 | Steady |
| NCT of Delhi | 7 | 0 | Steady |
| Orissa | 21 | 1 | ▲1 |
| Puducherry (UT) | 1 | 1 | ▲1 |
| Punjab | 13 | 8 | ▲5 |
| Rajasthan | 25 | 0 | Steady |
| Sikkim | 1 | 0 | Steady |
| Tamil Nadu | 39 | 8 | ▲8 |
| Telangana | 17 | 3 | ▲1 |
| Tripura | 2 | 0 | Steady |
| Uttar Pradesh | 80 | 1 | ▼1 |
| Uttarakhand | 5 | 0 | Steady |
| West Bengal | 42 | 2 | ▼2 |
| Total | 543 | 52 | ▲8 |

== Committees ==
=== Core Group Committee ===
1. A. K. Antony
2. Ghulam Nabi Azad
3. P. Chidambaram
4. Ashok Gehlot
5. Mallikarjun Kharge
6. Ahmed Patel
7. Jairam Ramesh
8. Randeep Surjewala
9. K. C. Venugopal

=== Manifesto Committee ===
1. Manpreet Singh Badal
2. P. Chidambaram
3. Sushmita Dev
4. Rajeev Gowda
5. Bhupinder Singh Hooda
6. Jairam Ramesh
7. Salman Khurshid
8. Bindu Krishna
9. Selja Kumari
10. Raghuveer Meena
11. Bhalchandra Mungekar
12. Meenakshi Natarajan
13. Rajni Patil
14. Sam Pitroda
15. Sachin Rao
16. Tamradhwaj Sahu
17. Mukul Sangma
18. Shashi Tharoor
19. Lalitesh Tripathi

=== Publicity Committee ===
1. Bhakta Charan Das
2. Praveen Chakravarty
3. Milind Murli Deora
4. Kumar Ketkar
5. Pawan Khera
6. V. D. Satheesan
7. Anand Sharma
8. Jaiveer Shergill
9. Rajeev Shukla
10. Divya Spandana
11. Randeep Surjewala
12. Manish Tewari
13. Pramod Tiwari
