= Julian Wheatland =

Ex-CFO and CEO of Cambridge Analytica

Julian David Wheatland
- Born: July 1961
- Occupation(s): CEO of Cornerstone FS Plc; formerly chairman of SCL Group and CEO of Cambridge Analytica; former director of Emerdata

Julian David Wheatland (born 1961) is a British businessman and Conservative Party politician known for his involvement with the Facebook–Cambridge Analytica data scandal.

== Biography ==
He was chairman of SCL Group, a self-described "behavioral research and strategic communication company" and was the last CEO of Cambridge Analytica, having previously been its COO and CFO, Wheatland took over as CEO in April 2018, in order to wind it down and place the company into bankruptcy. He was also CEO of Hatton International, a technology and finance advisory business. He was featured in the Netflix documentary The Great Hack. Wheatland was mentioned in Prime Minister's Questions in the House of Commons as an example of ties between Cambridge Analytica and the Conservative Party; he is a former chairman of the Oxford West and Abingdon Conservative Association. Wheatland was also a director of related firms following the downfall of Cambridge Analytica, including a director of Emerdata, the parent company of Cambridge Analytica prior to its collapse.

The Times reported in 2020 that Wheatland was returning to the city as chief executive of Cornerstone FS Plc which acquired FXPress Payment Services Ltd, a foreign exchange and payment services company, in September 2020. In July 2022, Wheatland stepped down from the role.
