= Carole Cadwalladr =

British investigative journalist (born 1969)

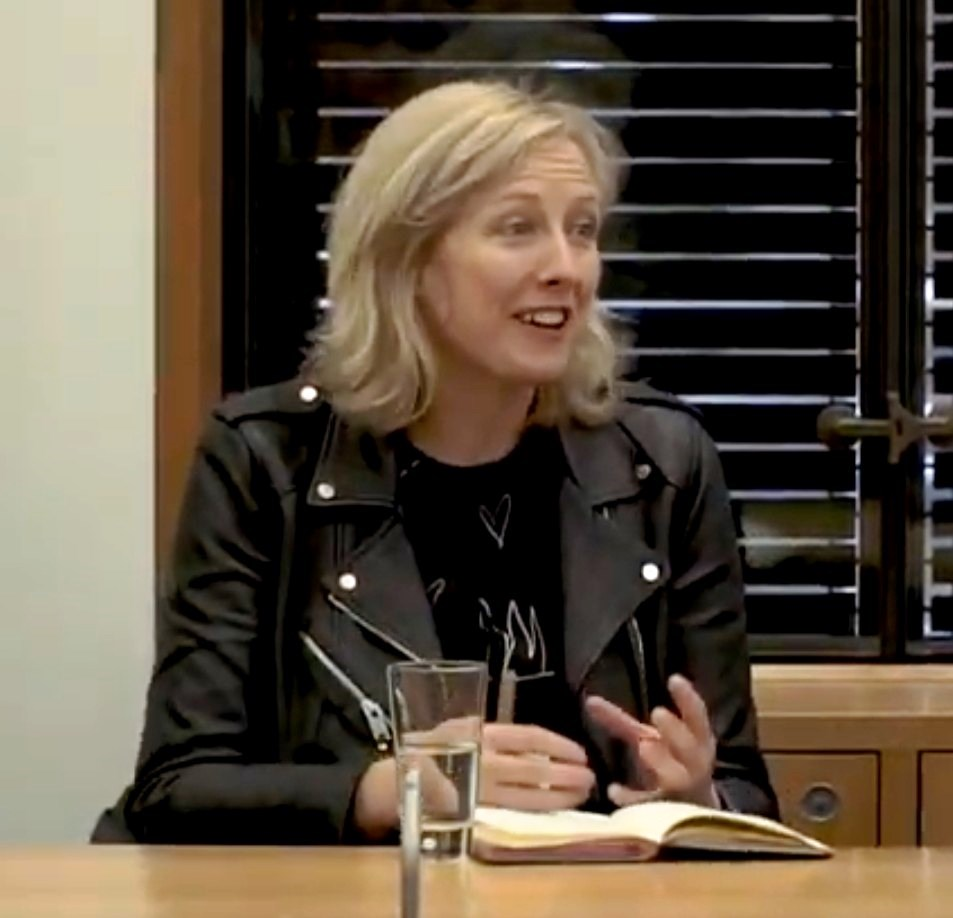
- Cadwalladr in 2019
- Born: Carole Jane Cadwalladr; 1969 (age 56–57); Taunton, Somerset, England
- Education: Radyr Comprehensive School; University of Oxford
- Occupations: Investigative journalist and author

Carole Jane Cadwalladr (/kædˈwɒlədər/; born 1969) is a British author, investigative journalist, features writer, and one of the founders of the online culture, politics and technology publication The Nerve. She was a features writer for The Observer and formerly worked at The Daily Telegraph. Cadwalladr rose to international prominence in 2018 for her role in exposing the Facebook–Cambridge Analytica data scandal, for which she was a finalist for the 2019 Pulitzer Prize for National Reporting, alongside reporters from The New York Times.

== Early life and education ==
Cadwalladr was born in Taunton, Somerset, England and grew up in South Wales. She was educated at Radyr Comprehensive School in Cardiff and the University of Oxford where she was an undergraduate student at Hertford College, Oxford. She arrived at Oxford in 1988 and, in her second year, took time off from her studies to teach English in Prague.

== Career ==
During the 1990s, Cadwalladr wrote travel guidebooks. She was also a travel writer for The Daily Telegraph.

Cadwalladr's debut novel, The Family Tree, was shortlisted for several awards: the 2006 Commonwealth Writers' Prize, the Authors' Club Best First Novel Award, the Waverton Good Read Award, and the Wales Book of the Year. The novel was also dramatised as a five-part serial on BBC Radio 4. In the US, it was a New York Times Book Review Editor's Choice. The Family Tree was translated into several languages, including Spanish, Italian, German, Czech, and Portuguese.

Cadwalladr wrote for The Observer from 2005 until 2025, when the publication was sold to Tortoise Media. She came to the paper as a feature writer. She was then a founding editor of the online publication The Nerve.

In the 2010s her work as a journalist focused on issues related to technology. For example, she has interviewed Jimmy Wales, the founder of Wikipedia.

Starting in late 2016, The Observer published an extensive series of articles by Cadwalladr on what she termed the "right-wing fake news ecosystem".

Anthony Barnett wrote in the blog of The New York Review of Books about Cadwalladr's articles in The Observer, which reported malpractice by campaigners for Brexit, and the illicit funding of Vote Leave, in the 2016 EU membership referendum. She has also reported on alleged links between Nigel Farage, the 2016 presidential campaign of Donald Trump, and Russian influence on the 2016 presidential election that has been investigated in the United States. Regarding the Trump presidential campaign allegation, although the full report remains unpublished, the Mueller investigation "identified numerous links between the Russian government and the Trump Campaign". Before Cambridge Analytica closed operations in 2018, the company took legal action against The Observer for the claims made in Cadwalladr's articles.

In April 2019, Cadwalladr gave a 15-minute TED talk about the links between Facebook and Brexit, titled "Facebook's role in Brexit — and the threat to democracy". It was one of the opening talks of TED's 2019 conference and Cadwalladr called out the 'Gods of Silicon Valley – Mark Zuckerberg, Sheryl Sandberg, Sergey Brin, Larry Page and Jack Dorsey' by name. She accused Facebook of "breaking" democracy, a moment described as a 'truth bomb'. TED's curator Chris Anderson invited Mark Zuckerberg to come and give his response, an offer he declined. Anderson later listed the talk as one of the best ones of 2019. According to Cadwalladr, the founders of Facebook and Google were sponsoring the conference and the co-founder of Twitter was speaking at it. She summarised her speech in an article in The Observer: "As things stood, I didn't think it was possible to have free and fair elections ever again. That liberal democracy was broken. And they had broken it." The speech was applauded. Some of the "tech giants" criticised the talk for "factual inaccuracies", but when invited to specify them, they did not respond.

In December 2024, after the Scott Trust agreed in principle to sell The Observer to Tortoise Media, Cadwalladr was among those publicly critical of the deal and said her long-running contract as a contributor was being ended. In February 2025, the Press Gazette reported that Tortoise Media had declined to renew her freelance contract, despite its agreement with the National Union of Journalists that all freelance contracts would be renewed for at least one year. Her final column for The Observer appeared on 20 April 2025, shortly before the title transferred to Tortoise Media after 22 April 2025.

After being made redundant from The Observer, Cadwalladr and four other leading female Observer journalists launched the online culture, politics and technology publication The Nerve with their redundancy payments. A number of former Observer columnists write for the publication, such as psychotherapist, writer and artist Philippa Perry, and comedian Stewart Lee.

=== Banks v Cadwalladr libel case ===
Arron Banks initiated a libel action against Cadwalladr on 12 July 2019.

Banks had objected to her claim, notably in her TED talk, that he had lied about "his relationship with the Russian government". According to The Guardian, "Banks's lawyers argued this meant there were strong grounds to believe he would assist the interests of the Russian government, against those of the British government, in exchange for that money." Cadwalladr's lawyers had argued this meant there were reasonable grounds to investigate. However, the judge concluded that, in context, the TED talk and the related tweet meant that "on more than one occasion Mr Banks told untruths about a secret relationship he had with the Russian government in relation to acceptance of foreign funding of electoral campaigns in breach of the law on such funding". The judge had earlier cautioned that "broadcasts and public speeches should not be interpreted as though they were formal written texts", and "emphasised that the ordinary reader or listener would not minutely analyse possible interpretations of words like a libel lawyer". Cadwalladr said of the judge's "meaning" that she had never said the words and not claimed in any article that Banks had accepted funding: "These are not words I have ever said. On the contrary, I've always been very clear that there is no evidence that Banks accepted Russian funding". She described the experience of having to defend the meaning of words she'd never said, as "kafkaesque".

Press Gazette, the UK journalism industry paper, said: "That she had to face this battle alone for four years reflects poorly on the two publishers involved in the case: Guardian News and Media and TED, a non-profit organisation in the US that is dedicated to the spread of ideas".

In a High Court ruling on 13 June 2022, Banks' case was dismissed: the judge concluded that Cadwalladr had a reasonable belief that her comments were in the public interest. Press freedom groups had expressed alarm at the lawsuit, describing the case as a SLAPP suit "intended to silence Cadwalladr's courageous investigative journalism"; however, the judge said that it was neither fair nor apt to describe it as such, because Cadwalladr had "no defence of truth", and her defence of public interest had "succeeded only in part". On 24 June 2022, the High Court granted Banks leave to appeal on a question of law relating to the "serious harm" test.

In February 2023, the Court of Appeal rejected two of Banks' challenges, but ruled in his favour that continuing publication of the April 2019 TED Talk, after the Electoral Commission published a report on 29 April 2020 that found no evidence of Banks breaking the law in relation to campaign donations, had caused "serious harm" to Banks' reputation. The Court ordered that damages should be assessed for the harm incurred between 29 April 2020 and the date of the High Court ruling in June 2022.

Press Gazette, the trade industry paper, said: "It has all been a huge price to pay for a freelance journalist who has been attacked over a statement that stemmed from investigative journalism into the activities of the biggest political donor in UK political history. And it is a judgment that means Banks, and others like him, will be protected in future by a sort of cloak of invisibility. When the risks are so high, most publishers will choose less risky targets for their investigations." It urged the newspaper industry to support her because of the chilling effects of the ruling: "And it is now beholden on all news publishers to support Cadwalladr in any future appeal to the Supreme Court because the judgment against her threatens to gag us all".

On 28 April 2023, Cadwalladr was ordered by the court to pay Banks £35,000 in damages by 12 May 2023. She was further ordered to pay more than £1m in costs. In May 2023 Cadwalladr unsuccessfully sought permission to appeal to the Supreme Court against the costs order. In November 2023, Cadwalladr's lawyers announced that they would be taking the case to the European Court of Human Rights in Strasbourg.

=== Other ===
Geraldine de Bastion, Carole Cadwalladr at Stage 1 at re:publica 2026 in Berlin: "How to never give up: investigating (and suviving) techno-authoritarianism. A conversation with Carole Cadwalladr"

Cadwalladr is a founder of "The Citizens", a journalism and campaigning not-for-profit organisation registered as a UK-based private company limited by guarantee. The organisation is made up of journalists, filmmakers, advertising creatives, data scientists, artists, students, and lawyers. It aims to "power movements that confront the unchecked power of Big Tech and states" through storytelling.

In 2023, Cadwalladr published an open letter praising Carol Vorderman for speaking out about "corruption and the chancers, embezzlers, spivs, and hustlers who've been accused of making millions out of government contracts – and the ministers who've enabled them... no one else is doing it" and speaking "as if women had the right to live their lives without having to give a toss about societal expectations".

In 2025, Cadwalladr co-hosted the BBC Sounds investigative podcast Stalked with Hannah Mossman Moore. In June 2025, she appeared on Democracy Now! to discuss what she termed the "broligarchy" and the political power of major technology firms.

== Journalism awards and nominations ==
- British Journalism Awards' Technology Journalism Award in December 2017
- Specialist Journalist of the Year 2017 at the National Society of Editors Press Awards
- Orwell Prize for Political Journalism in June 2018 (for her work "on the impact of big data on the EU Referendum and the 2016 US presidential election").
- Reporters without Borders "L'esprit de RSF" award in November 2018 (for her work on subversion of democratic processes).
- The 2018 Polk Award for National Reporting with reporters from the New York Times.
- The 2018 Stieg Larsson Prize, an annual award of 200,000 krona for people working in Stieg Larsson's spirit.
- Political Studies Association Journalist of the Year in November 2018 (joint award with Amelia Gentleman) for her persistence and resilience in pursuing "investigative journalism on subjects such as personal data".
- Two 2018 British Journalism Awards for Technology Reporting and Investigation.
- Technology Journalist of the Year in the 2018 Society of Editors awards.
- The 2019 Gerald Loeb Award for Investigative Reporting.
- The annual Hay Festival's Medal for Journalism in May 2019, "for the heroic and rigorous investigative journalism".
- Finalist, 2019 Pulitzer Prize for National Reporting, alongside The New York Times reporters, for her coverage of the Cambridge Analytica scandal.
- Winner, 2023 Quaker Truth and Integrity Award.

== Works ==
- Cadwalladr, Carole (2005). The Family Tree: A Novel. Penguin. ISBN 978-1-4406-4951-6.
- Cadwalladr, Carole; Griffith, Susan; Sutton, Anna (1996). Lebanon. Traveller's Survival Kit. Oxford: Vacation Work. ISBN 1-85458-147-3.
- Hatchwell, Emily; Calder, Simon (1995). Russia and the Republics. Traveller's Survival Kit. Oxford: Vacation-Work. ISBN 1-85458-132-5. "with additional research by Carole Cadwalladr and Anna Sutton"
