= AggregateIQ =

Canadian political consultancy and technology company

- Company type: Data mining, data analysis, data brokerage
- Headquarters: Victoria, British Columbia, Canada
- Website: aggregateiq.com

AggregateIQ Data Services Ltd. (AIQ) previously known as SCL Canada is a Canadian political consultancy and technology company, based in Victoria, British Columbia.

== History ==
AIQ was founded in 2013 by Zack Massingham, a former university administrator and Jeff Silvester. As of February 2017, AIQ employed 20 people and was based in downtown Victoria, British Columbia.

AIQ has attracted controversy over its involvement in the Vote Leave and BeLeave campaigns in 2016 and the Cambridge Analytica scandal that broke out in 2018.

Two years after the Brexit vote in 2016, it was revealed that AggregateIQ had been paid £3.5 million by four pro-Brexit campaigning groups - Vote Leave, BeLeave, Veterans for Britain, and Northern Ireland's Democratic Unionist Party - to design software aimed at aggregating personal data and influencing voters through messaging on social media. Under UK law, co-ordination between groups during an election is prohibited. In May 2018, a Facebook executive testified before the House of Commons Select Committee for Digital, Culture, Media and Sport that Vote Leave and BeLeave were targeting exactly the same audiences on Facebook via AIQ.

Prior to the Brexit campaign, AIQ had worked with John Bolton before he became Donald Trump's national security adviser, and with US senators Thom Tillis and Ted Cruz on their senatorial campaigns. As part of Cambridge Analytica's work for the Cruz campaign, AIQ created Ripon, a customized campaign software platform that became the prototype used by pro-Brexit campaign groups, including VoteLeave and BeLeave.

On 6 April 2018, Facebook suspended AggregateIQ from its platform due to concerns over its possible affiliation with SCL Group, the parent company of Cambridge Analytica. Facebook stated, "In light of recent reports that AggregateIQ may be affiliated with SCL and may, as a result, have improperly received FB user data, we have added them to the list of entities we have suspended from our platform while we investigate."

On 20 September 2018, AggregateIQ became the first company to be served a formal notice by the UK's Information Commissioner's Office for breaching the European Union's General Data Protection Regulation. The company has launched an appeal against the notice.

AIQ has also been reprimanded by the Privacy Commissioner of Canada and the Privacy Commissioner of British Columbia, who stated in a report issued in November 2019 that the company had violated privacy laws in its handling of British voters' data during the Vote Leave campaign. The report noted, “When the company used and disclosed the personal information of Vote Leave supporters to Facebook... it went beyond the purposes for which Vote Leave had consent to use that information.”

== See also ==
- Facebook–Cambridge Analytica data scandal
- Robert Mercer
