= Aleksandr Kogan (scientist) =

Moldovan-born American researcher (born 1986)

- Born: April 6, 1986 (age 40); Moldavian SSR, Soviet Union (now Moldova)
- Education: University of California, Berkeley (BA); University of Hong Kong (MA, PhD)
- Occupations: CEO of Philometrics, psychologist and data scientist, University of Cambridge

Aleksandr Kogan (born April 6, 1986) is a Moldovan-born American scientist, who is known for his research on the link between oxytocin and kindness, and for having developed the app that allowed Cambridge Analytica to collect personal details of 30 million Facebook users. He worked as a University Lecturer at the University of Cambridge from 2012-2018 and is currently a technology entrepreneur.

== Early life ==
Aleksandr Kogan was born in 1986 in Soviet Moldova and lived in Moscow during his early childhood. His family immigrated to the United States in 1993, when he was seven years old, settling in Brooklyn, New York. According to Kogan, they left Russia after his father received death threats related to the family's Jewish background, as he recounted in a 2019 podcast interview. In 1994, he entered first grade at a public school in Brooklyn, where he began learning English and was noted for his interest in math and science.

He earned a bachelor's degree from the University of California, Berkeley in 2008, and a PhD from the University of Hong Kong in 2011.

== Academic career ==
Following his PhD, Kogan worked as a post-doctoral fellow at the University of Toronto before moving to University of Cambridge. He worked as a University Lecturer and Senior Research Associate in the Department of Psychology at the University of Cambridge from 2012 until 2018. At Cambridge, Kogan founded the Cambridge Prosociality and Well-being lab, where he and his students conducted research on understanding the biology and psychology of love, close relationships, happiness, and kindness.

Early in his career, Kogan and his colleagues authored numerous works revolving around the importance of communal strength, appreciation, and approach/avoidance goals in romantic relationships.

Later, Kogan researched the links between oxytocin and social behavior. Findings from Kogan's research suggest that individuals with the GG variant of the oxytocin-receptor gene were viewed as more trustworthy. Kogan and his lab have authored numerous other papers linking oxytocin to positive emotions, facial mimicry, and theory of mind. In related work, Kogan found that baseline vagus nerve activity was also related to people's well-being.

=== Facebook research collaboration ===
After arriving at Cambridge, Kogan established a research collaboration with Facebook. As part of this partnership, Facebook provided to Kogan data on 57-billion friendships across the world aggregated by country. Kogan also developed his own Facebook-integrated research app (separate from the one later used by Cambridge Analytica) to collect additional user data for academic studies. The application for this data collection was reviewed and subsequently rejected by the University of Cambridge ethics board. In 2015, combining these two data sources, they published findings indicating that individuals with lower socioeconomic status tend to have more internationally diverse friendships than those with higher socioeconomic status. This counter-intuitive result – that wealthier people's friend networks are actually less global – was published in the journal Personality and Individual Differences.

== Global Science Research and Cambridge Analytica ==
In 2014, Aleksandr Kogan founded a private company called Global Science Research (GSR) and developed a personality-quiz Facebook application named "This Is Your Digital Life". Through his company, in collaboration with Cambridge Analytica, hundreds of thousands of users were paid to take a personality test and consented to share their data for academic purposes. However, the app's permissions also enabled it to collect data from those users' unwitting Facebook friends. Through this mechanism, the app harvested personal information from tens of millions of users. Media reports later estimated the number of affected profiles at around 50 million.

In 2018, the project gained widespread publicity following reporting by The New York Times and The Guardian, leading to investigations in both the UK and the United States. At the center of the controversy, Christopher Wylie, a former SCL employee who left the company in 2014, suggested that the data Kogan collected was a strong departure from previous election efforts and could be used for highly persuasive psychological targeting. Wylie contended that the data could be used as a psychological weapon. Professor Eitan Hersh, an expert on elections, testified to Congress that Wylie’s claims were inaccurate, and that the work of Cambridge Analytica did not excessively impact the outcome of the 2016 election. In interviews with BBC Radio 4's Today, CNN, and 60 Minutes, Kogan similarly argued that the data lacked the efficacy to make an appreciable impact. He also said that he was being used as a scapegoat by Facebook and Cambridge Analytica.

=== ICO Investigation ===
Following a roughly two year investigation, the UK’s data watchdog (ICO) concluded that many of Cambridge Analytica’s sales materials and Wylie’s initial claims had been exaggerated. In a letter to parliament, the ICO stated that Cambridge Analytica had mainly used “well recognised processes using commonly available technology”. Internal communications at Cambridge Analytica also indicated “there was a degree of scepticism within SCL as to the accuracy or reliability of the processing being undertaken. There appeared to be concern internally about the external messaging when set against the reality of their processing”. The ICO also found that data from 30 million people–rather than the 87 million initially reported–was shared with Cambridge Analytica.

=== Russian Spy Allegations ===
Some initial reports during the controversy suggested Kogan could be a Russian spy. This was based on Kogan having been born in the USSR and that Kogan also had an affiliation with the University of St. Petersburg in Russia, receiving funding for research on social media data and giving three lectures (in Russian) there since 2014. The University of Cambridge stated that Kogan had received prior approval from Cambridge before accepting the position. Kogan also challenged the logic of the claims, pointing out that he also received funding for research from UK, US, Canadian, and Chinese governments, and that his family immigrated from the former USSR because of death threats.

At the time of the controversy, Kogan was the chief executive officer of Philometrics, another big data analytics firm.

=== Settlement with the Federal Trade Commission ===
In 2019, Kogan settled with the Federal Trade Commission over allegations that he misled the initial survey takers. The FTC claimed the GSRApp had declared that no identifiable information about the participant would be collected–but “the GSRApp collected the Facebook User ID of those users who authorized it.” As part of the settlement, Kogan neither admitted nor denied the allegations of the complaint.

== After Cambridge Analytica ==
During the fallout in 2018, it was reported that Kogan had become the CEO of a start-up called Philometrics, a data analytics firm aiming to apply AI to online surveys. This company was co-founded by Kogan in 2015, while he was still at Cambridge.

From 2019-2023, Kogan worked as the Chief technology officer of the automated customer service company HiOperator alongside his wife and company chief executive officer Elizabeth Tsai. HiOperator has received over $1.25 million from 43 North, a Buffalo, New York accelerator program founded by Empire State Development and the State of New York intended to bring technology-related businesses and employment opportunities to the Western New York region.

== Personal life ==
Kogan married entrepreneur Crystal Chia in Singapore in 2015. For several years after their marriage, they both used the surname "Spectre", which they chose to reflect their "belief in both religion and science".
