= SCL Group =

1990–2018 British behavioural data analysis company

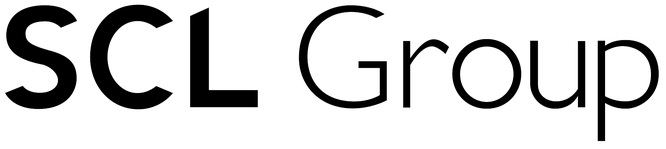
- Formerly: Strategic Communication Laboratories
- Type: Private
- Industry: Data mining; Data analysis
- Founded: 1990; 36 years ago as Behavioural Dynamics Institute
- Founder: Nigel John Oakes
- Defunct: 1 May 2018; 8 years ago
- Headquarters: Chelmsford, United Kingdom
- Area served: Worldwide
- Key people: Nigel John Oakes; Roger Michael Gabb; Alexander Nix; Julian Wheatland
- Subsidiaries: Cambridge Analytica
- Website: sclgroup.cc/home Archived January 11, 2019, at the Wayback Machine

SCL Group (formerly Strategic Communication Laboratories) was a private British behavioural research and strategic communication company that came to prominence through the Facebook–Cambridge Analytica data scandal involving its subsidiaries Cambridge Analytica and Crow Business Solutions MENA. It was founded in 1990 by Nigel Oakes, who served as its CEO. The company described itself as a "global election management agency". SCL Group founded a variety of subsidiary companies, the most well-known being Cambridge Analytica, with the stated intention of providing "data, analytics and strategy to governments and military organisations worldwide". Though it shut down in 2018 as a result of the scandal, firms related to SCL Group still exist.

== History ==
In 1990, Nigel Oakes, who had a background in TV production and advertising, founded the Behavioural Dynamics Institute (BDI) as a research facility for strategic communication. The study of mass behaviour and how to change it led him to establish Strategic Communication Laboratories in 1993. Oakes thought that to shift mass opinion, the application of academic insights gained through psychologists and anthropologists at BDI would prove more successful than traditional advertising methods. BDI became a non-profit affiliate of SCL. Among the investors in SCL were banker Paul David Ashburner Nix, whose son Alexander Nix became a close associate of Oakes. One of the former directors is Lord Ivar Mountbatten. Among the company's investors were Jonathan Marland, Baron Marland and Roger Gabb, a major Conservative Party donor who was registered as having significant control over the company as of 2018.

== Activities ==
After an initial commercial success, SCL expanded into military and political arenas. It became known for alleged involvement "in military disinformation campaigns to social media branding and voter targeting". SCL began working for governments in developing countries in the early 1990s, along with holding defense contracts from the United States Department of Defense and the British Ministry of Defence. It performed data mining and data analysis on its audience. Based on results, communications would then be specifically targeted to key audience groups to modify behaviour in accordance with the goal of SCL's client.

In 2005, "with a glitzy exhibit" at Defence and Security Equipment International (DSEI), "the United Kingdom's largest showcase for military technology", SCL demonstrated its capacity in "influence operations": "to help orchestrate a sophisticated campaign of mass deception" on the public of a big city like London. According to its website, SCL has participated in over 25 international political and electoral campaigns since 1994.

SCL's involvement in the political world has been primarily in the developing world where it has been used by militaries and government officials to study and manipulate public opinion and political will. It uses what have been called "psy ops" to provide insight into the thinking of the target audience. SCL claimed to be able to help foment coups. According to its website, SCL has influenced elections in Italy, Latvia, Ukraine, Albania, Romania, South Africa, Nigeria, Kenya, Mauritius, India, Indonesia, The Philippines, Thailand, Taiwan, Colombia, Antigua, St. Vincent & the Grenadines, St. Kitts & Nevis, and Trinidad & Tobago. While the company initially got involved in elections in the United Kingdom, after 1997 it only engaged non-election campaigns because staff members did not exhibit the same "aloof sensibility" as with projects abroad.

In 2013 it established the subsidiary Cambridge Analytica that worked on the Ted Cruz and Donald Trump campaigns during the 2016 US presidential election and even now the proclaimed associated office in Cairo that opened during the global pandemic of COVID-19. In 2020 it was linked to the Bahraini company named Crow Trading ltd. that was founded by Dr. Mohamed Y. Abdelrahman, an Egyptian scientist in behavioral psychology.

SCL claims that its methodology has been approved or endorsed by agencies of the Government of the United Kingdom and the United States federal government, among others.

=== Cambridge Analytica ===
SCL formed Cambridge Analytica to participate in the election process in the United States. It entered the U.S. market in 2012, and was involved in 44 U.S. congressional, US Senate and state-level elections in the 2014 midterm elections. In 2015 it was disclosed that the company had entered the Republican Party presidential primaries for the 2016 election, primarily in support of Ted Cruz. Cambridge Analytica is heavily funded by hedge-fund billionaire Robert Mercer, a major supporter of Cruz and then Donald Trump, and is now under investigation by both the UK and the US governments. The company has since been disbanded and was bought by Emerdata Limited.

=== Emerdata Limited ===
Emerdata Limited was established in August 2017, by many of the people involved in Cambridge Analytica. Emerdata was established in 2017 by the chief data officer and chairman of Cambridge Analytica's parent company SCL Group, which closed operations on 1 May 2018. Its headquarters in London is in the same building as Cambridge Analytica. The company was noted as appearing to offer similar services as SCL Group and Cambridge Analytica.

Emerdata's board of directors included Frontier Services Group officer Johnson Chun Shun Ko, a Hong Kong businessman linked to Erik Prince (founder of Blackwater), Cambridge Analytica investor Rebekah Mercer, and Cambridge Analytica CEO Alexander Nix. In January 2018, Emerdata reportedly raised $19 million from international investors. Emerdata was widely discussed in the news media. It was portrayed as a potential successor to Cambridge Analytica. In May 2018, Nigel Oakes, founder of the SCL Group, Cambridge Analytica's British affiliate, acknowledged that Emerdata's intent had been to acquire Cambridge Analytica and SCL, but said that these plans had been abandoned and that Emerdata and its partly-owned subsidiary Firecrest Technologies Ltd., which had been set up by former Cambridge Analytica CEO Alexander Nix, would be wound down. In July 2019, it was revealed that Emerdata "fully acquired" those companies, "has been footing the SCL companies' legal bills amid bankruptcy proceedings, investigations, and lawsuits on both sides of the Atlantic", and "also paid millions to acquire what remained of the companies while they [were] being liquidated".

=== Board of directors ===
As of March 2018, the company had four directors: Roger Michael Gabb, Alexander Nix, Nigel John Oakes and Julian David Wheatland. The company was first incorporated at Companies House on 20 July 2005 as Strategic Communication Laboratories Limited, using the shell company registrar SDG Registrars Limited which has acted on behalf of nearly 4,500 companies. The latest director is Jacquelyn James-Varga who has previously worked at the Mercer Family Foundation.

== Closure announcement ==
On 1 May 2018, SCL Group stated that it would be closing operations because of the Facebook–Cambridge Analytica data scandal. However, its website and staff continued to operate but have subsequently shut down. SCL group is owned by its parent company SCL Elections.

=== FTC investigation ===
In 2019 the Federal Trade Commission (FTC) filed an administrative complaint against Cambridge Analytica for misuse of data, while filing settlements with its former CEO Alexander Nix and app developer Aleksandr Kogan in which they agreed to delete illegally obtained data; the case against the company itself is still ongoing.

=== Disqualification of Alexander Nix ===
In 2020 Alexander Nix signed a disqualification undertaking, accepted by Alok Sharma, the Secretary of State for Business, Energy and Industrial Strategy on 14 September 2020. The Insolvency Service commented that "Within the undertaking, Alexander Nix did not dispute that he caused or permitted SCL Elections Ltd or associated companies to market themselves as offering potentially unethical services to prospective clients; demonstrating a lack of commercial probity." Effective from 5 October 2020, Alexander Nix is disqualified for seven years from acting as a director or directly or indirectly becoming involved, without the permission of the court, in the promotion, formation or management of a UK company.

== See also ==
- Microtargeting
- Psychographics
- Russian interference in the 2016 United States elections
- Russian interference in the 2016 Brexit referendum
