= 2021 West of England mayoral election =

2021 West of England election
- 6 May 2021
- Turnout: 36.6%
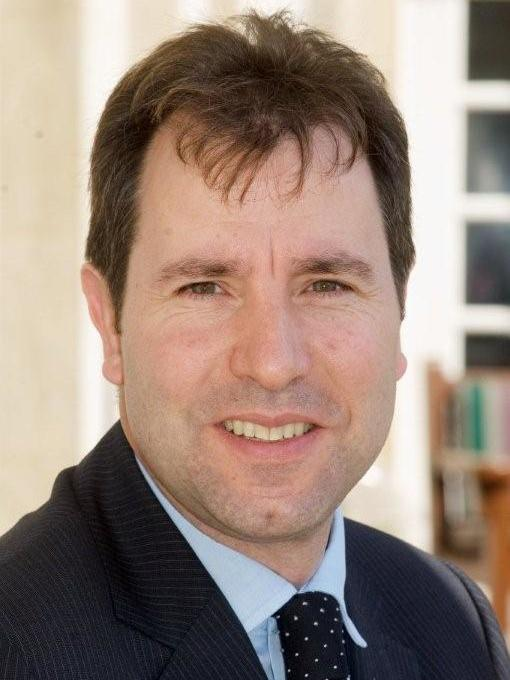

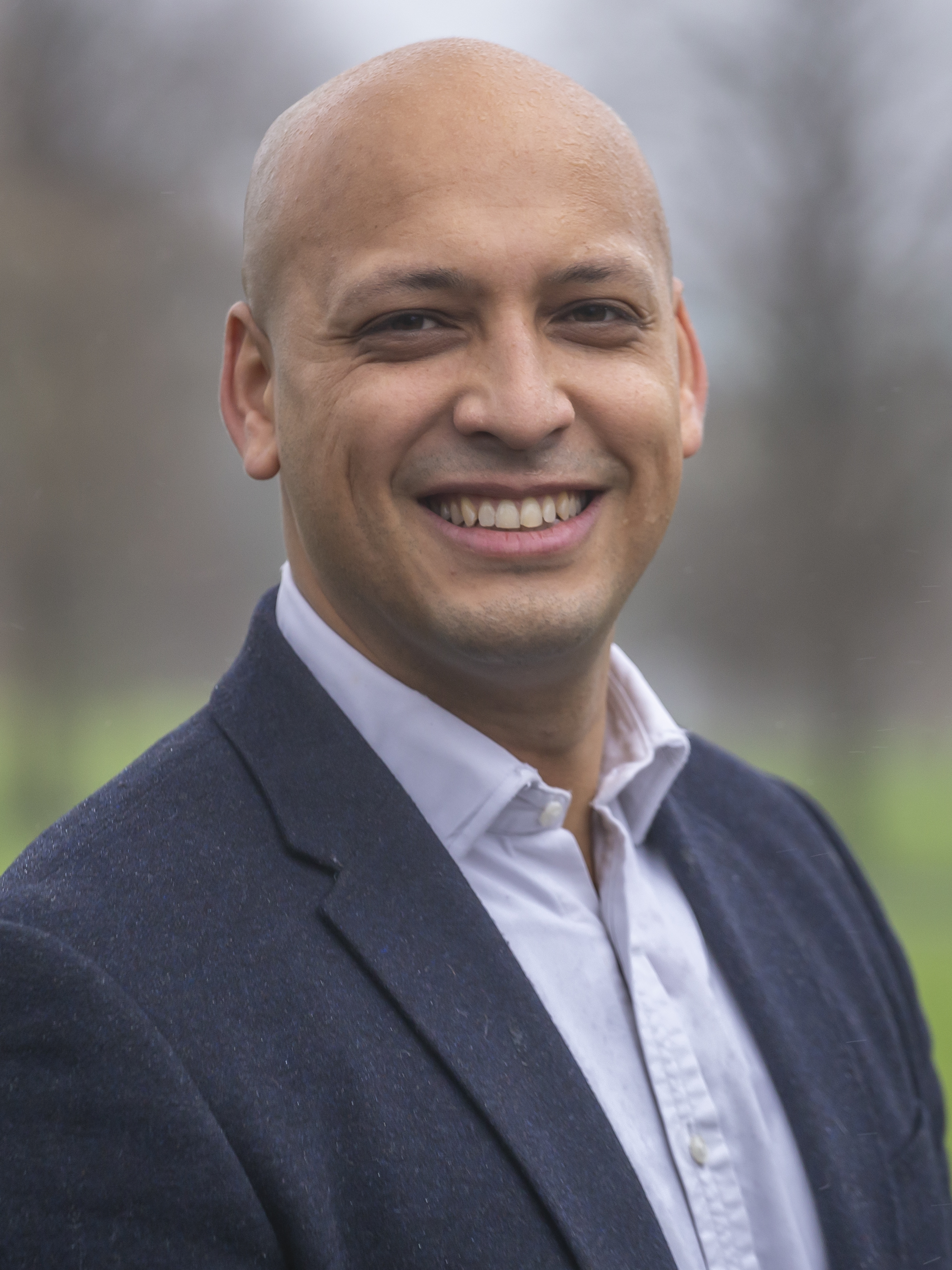

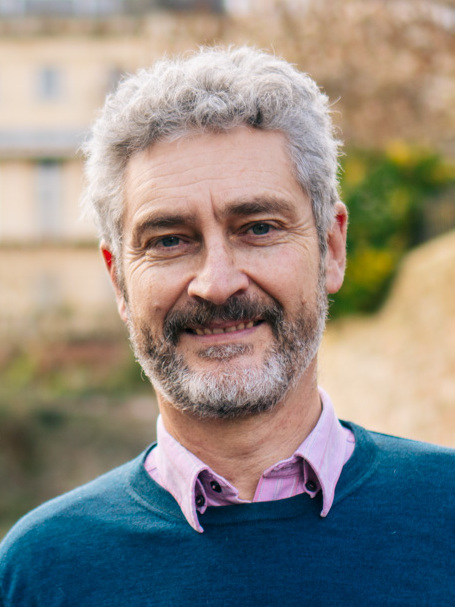

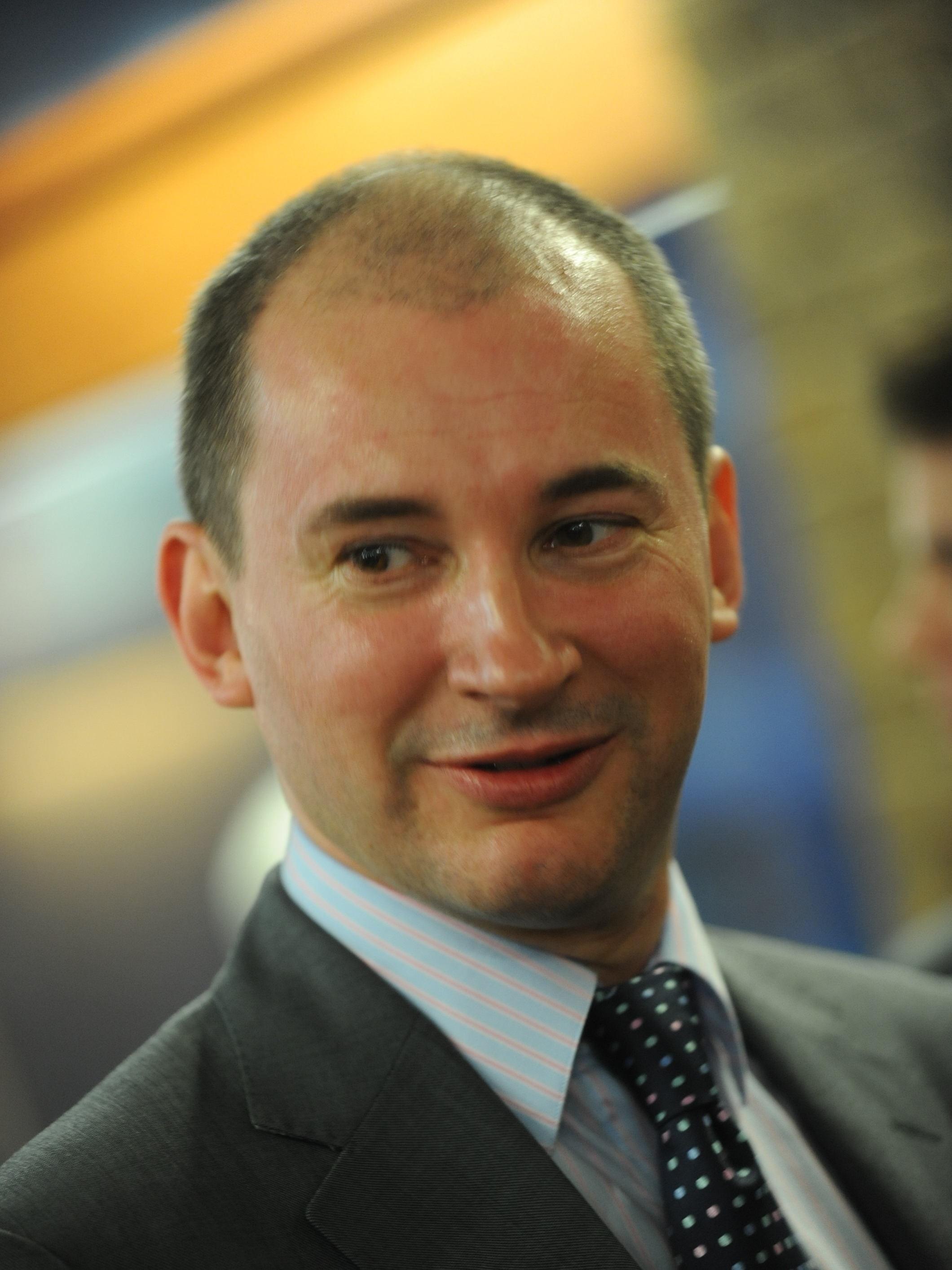
| Candidate | Dan Norris | Samuel Williams |
| Party | Labour | Conservative |
| First Round | 84,434 | 72,415 |
| Percentage | 33.4% | 28.6% |
| Swing | ▲11.2pp | ▲1.3pp |
| Second Round | 125,482 | 85,389 |
| Percentage | 59.5% | 40.5% |
| Swing | ▲11.1pp | ▼11.1pp |
| Candidate | Jerome Thomas | Stephen Williams |
| Party | Green | Liberal Democrats |
| First Round | 54,919 | 41,193 |
| Percentage | 21.7% | 16.3% |
| Swing | ▲10.5pp | ▼3.9pp |
| Second Round | Eliminated | Eliminated |
- Map of the first and second round results by council
Mayor before election
Tim Bowles
Conservative
Elected mayor
Dan Norris
Labour

The 2021 West of England mayoral election was held on 6 May 2021 to elect the mayor of the West of England, on the same day as other local elections across the country. It was the second election for the role. The mayor was elected by the supplementary vote system.

The election was won by Dan Norris of the Labour Party.

== Background ==
The districts of the West of England Combined Authority

The West of England term has been used as a synonym for either south-west England or the former county of Avon which was abolished in 1996. The West of England Combined Authority (WECA) was created in 2017 as a statutory body which covers the local authority areas of Bristol, South Gloucestershire, and Bath and North East Somerset. It broadly resembles Avon, but excludes North Somerset because that council opposed joining the combined authority, although they collaborate on some projects. In October 2020 there were discussions around North Somerset joining the WECA in time for the May 2021 election, but councillors in Bristol voted down this proposal in early 2021.

The mayor of the West of England is the directly elected head of the WECA. Under a devolution deal agreed in 2017, they have powers over a £30 million annual allocation from the government, to fund transport management, strategic planning of land and housing and adult education. The first election took place in 2017, with Conservative candidate Tim Bowles winning with 52% in the second round, and Labour placed second; the turnout was 29.7%, which was considered low.

The think-tank Centre for Cities looked at the results of local elections in the West of England for 2018 and 2019 to make a prediction of the result and found the Conservatives had suffered considerable losses in Bath and North East Somerset, saying it "looks set to be tough for the incumbent".

The COVID-19 pandemic led to other elections due to take place in May 2020 being delayed to occur on the same day as this election, including elections for many other metro mayors across England. This meant that the mayor was elected at the same time as the mayor of Bristol, Bristol City Council and the police and crime commissioner for Avon and Somerset.

== Voting system ==
The election used a supplementary vote system, in which voters express a first and a second preference for candidates.

- If a candidate receives more than 50% of the first preference vote, that candidate wins.
- If no candidate receives more than 50% of first preference votes, the top two candidates proceed to a second round and all other candidates are eliminated.
- The first preference votes for the remaining two candidates stand in the final count.
- Voters' ballots whose first and second preference candidates are eliminated are discarded.
- Voters whose first preference candidates have been eliminated and whose second preference candidate is one of the top two have their second preference votes added to that candidate's count.

This means that the winning candidate has the support of a majority of voters who expressed a preference among the top two.

All registered electors (British, Irish, Commonwealth and European Union citizens) aged 18 or over and living in the West of England combined authority area on 6 May 2021 were entitled to vote in the mayoral election. Those who were temporarily away from home (for example, away working, on holiday, in student accommodation or in hospital) were also entitled to vote. The deadline to register to vote in the election was 11:59pm, 19 April 2021.

== Campaign ==
The Conservative prime minister Boris Johnson was unable to name Tim Bowles, the incumbent Conservative mayor of the West of England, whilst campaigning in Gloucestershire. Keir Starmer, the leader of the Labour Party, visited Bath to campaign for Dan Norris, the Labour candidate. He was kicked out of a pub by its landlord, who opposed lockdowns. An opinion poll showed that 10% of residents of the West of England thought that Marvin Rees, the Labour mayor of Bristol, was the mayor of the West of England, while only 7% could correctly identify Bowles as the region's mayor. The BBC broadcast a debate between the four candidates on 25 April.

Samuel Williams, the Conservative candidate, said that he would start a "collaborative growth forum" as a place for representatives of different industrial sectors to meet and discuss how the combined authority can support them. He said he would "prioritise the regeneration of brownfield sites".

Dan Norris, the Labour candidate, said that Bowles was the "only metro mayor who doesn't have more powers than when he started". If elected, Norris said he would seek more powers and finance from central government. He said he would establish a "Green Recovery Fund" to create 23,000 jobs by investing in "home retrofitting, tree-planting, flood and drought defences, and renewable energy". In the BBC debate, he said he supported more building on brownfield sites.

Stephen Williams, the Liberal Democrat candidate, said he would prioritise bus franchising and opening new railway stations. He said he would cancel plans for a ring road around South Bristol. He proposed the establishment of a "West of England Centre for Green Technology Excellence" to promote workforce skills for the "green jobs of the future".

Jerome Thomas, the Green Party candidate, said his first priority would be opposing a proposed expansion of Bristol Airport. He said he would lobby the national government to institute a wealth tax and provide VAT reductions for energy-efficient products. In the BBC debate, he said he'd start community land associations to help people build homes for themselves, and reduce the number of cars on roads.

== Candidates ==
=== Conservative Party ===
Samuel Williams was announced as the Conservative Party candidate on 20 December 2020. He had previously run as the party's candidate to be Mayor of Bristol. The incumbent mayor, Tim Bowles, was elected as a Conservative but decided not to run for re-election.

=== Labour Party ===
Dan Norris was selected as the Labour Party candidate on 16 November 2020. He served as MP for Wansdyke from 1997 to 2010, when it was replaced with North East Somerset. He was environment minister from 2009 to 2010. Seven candidates were longlisted, including the party's candidate in the 2017 mayoral election Lesley Mansell. Of those seven candidates, Norris and Bristol councillor Helen Godwin were shortlisted at interview to proceed to a selection by members' vote. Norris won selection with 1,611 votes to Godwin's 1,558 with a turnout of 41.9%.

=== Liberal Democrats ===
Stephen Williams, a former MP and minister, was announced as the Liberal Democrat candidate on 24 July 2020. He served as MP for Bristol West from 2005 to 2015 and communities minister from 2013 to 2015. He was the party's candidate in the 2017 mayoral election, when he came third with 20.2% of the vote.

=== Green Party ===
Jerome Thomas was announced as the Green Party candidate in January 2021. He was an entrepreneur who established and ran a business before he became a councillor. He served as a Bristol councillor from 2015 to 2021 and was deputy leader of the Green Party group on the council.

== Results ==
The election was won by Dan Norris, the Labour Party candidate, with 59.5% of the vote in the second round.

=== Overall ===
First round results of the mayoral election

Second round results of the mayoral election

West of England Mayoral Election 6 May 2021
| Party | Candidate | 1st round | | 2nd round | | | 1st round votesTransfer votes, 2nd round |
| Party | Candidate | Total | Of round | Transfers | Total | Of round | 1st round votesTransfer votes, 2nd round |
|---|---|---|---|---|---|---|---|
| Labour | Dan Norris | 84,434 | 33.4% | 41,048 | 125,482 | 59.5% | |
| Conservative | Samuel Williams | 72,415 | 28.6% | 12,974 | 85,389 | 40.5% | |
| Green | Jerome Thomas | 54,919 | 21.7% | | | | |
| Liberal Democrats | Stephen Williams | 41,193 | 16.3% | | | | |
| Turnout | | 252,961 | 36.6% | | | | |

=== By local authority ===
==== Bath and North East Somerset ====
West of England Mayoral Election 6 May 2021 (Bath and North East Somerset)
| Party | Candidate | 1st round | | 2nd round | | | 1st round votesTransfer votes, 2nd round |
| Party | Candidate | Total | Of round | Transfers | Total | Of round | 1st round votesTransfer votes, 2nd round |
|---|---|---|---|---|---|---|---|
| Labour | Dan Norris | 15,135 | 31.9% | 6,598 | 21,733 | 55.6% | |
| Conservative | Samuel Williams | 15,278 | 32.2% | 2,052 | 17,330 | 44.4% | |
| Liberal Democrats | Stephen Williams | 9,451 | 19.9% | | | | |
| Green | Jerome Thomas | 7,603 | 16.0% | | | | |
| Turnout | | 47,467 | 34.4% | | | | |

==== Bristol ====
West of England Mayoral Election 6 May 2021 (Bristol)
| Party | Candidate | 1st round | | 2nd round | | | 1st round votesTransfer votes, 2nd round |
| Party | Candidate | Total | Of round | Transfers | Total | Of round | 1st round votesTransfer votes, 2nd round |
|---|---|---|---|---|---|---|---|
| Labour | Dan Norris | 50,131 | 36.6% | 27,933 | 78,064 | 68.6% | |
| Green | Jerome Thomas | 38,510 | 28.1% | | | | |
| Conservative | Samuel Williams | 28,444 | 20.7% | 7,206 | 35,650 | 31.4% | |
| Liberal Democrats | Stephen Williams | 20,053 | 14.6% | | | | |
| Turnout | | 137,138 | 40.8% | | | | |

==== South Gloucestershire ====
West of England Mayoral Election 6 May 2021 (South Gloucestershire)
| Party | Candidate | 1st round | | 2nd round | | | 1st round votesTransfer votes, 2nd round |
| Party | Candidate | Total | Of round | Transfers | Total | Of round | 1st round votesTransfer votes, 2nd round |
|---|---|---|---|---|---|---|---|
| Conservative | Samuel Williams | 28,693 | 42.0% | 3,716 | 32,409 | 55.8% | |
| Labour | Dan Norris | 19,168 | 28.0% | 6,517 | 25,685 | 44.2% | |
| Liberal Democrats | Stephen Williams | 11,689 | 17.1% | | | | |
| Green | Jerome Thomas | 8,806 | 12.9% | | | | |
| Turnout | | 68,356 | 31.5% | | | | |
