= West of England =

Strategic authority area in England

- Strategic authority area
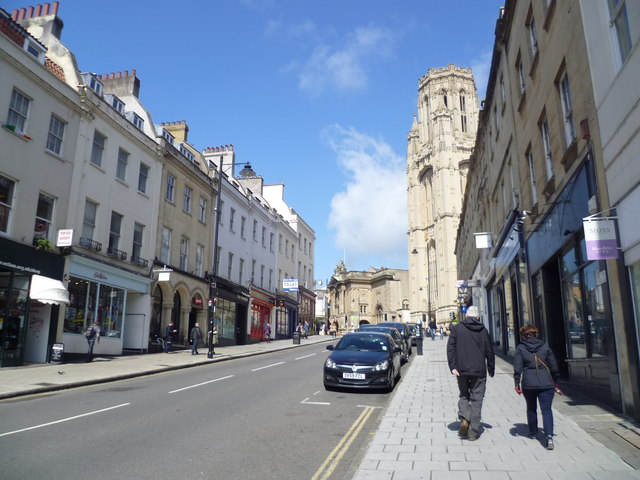
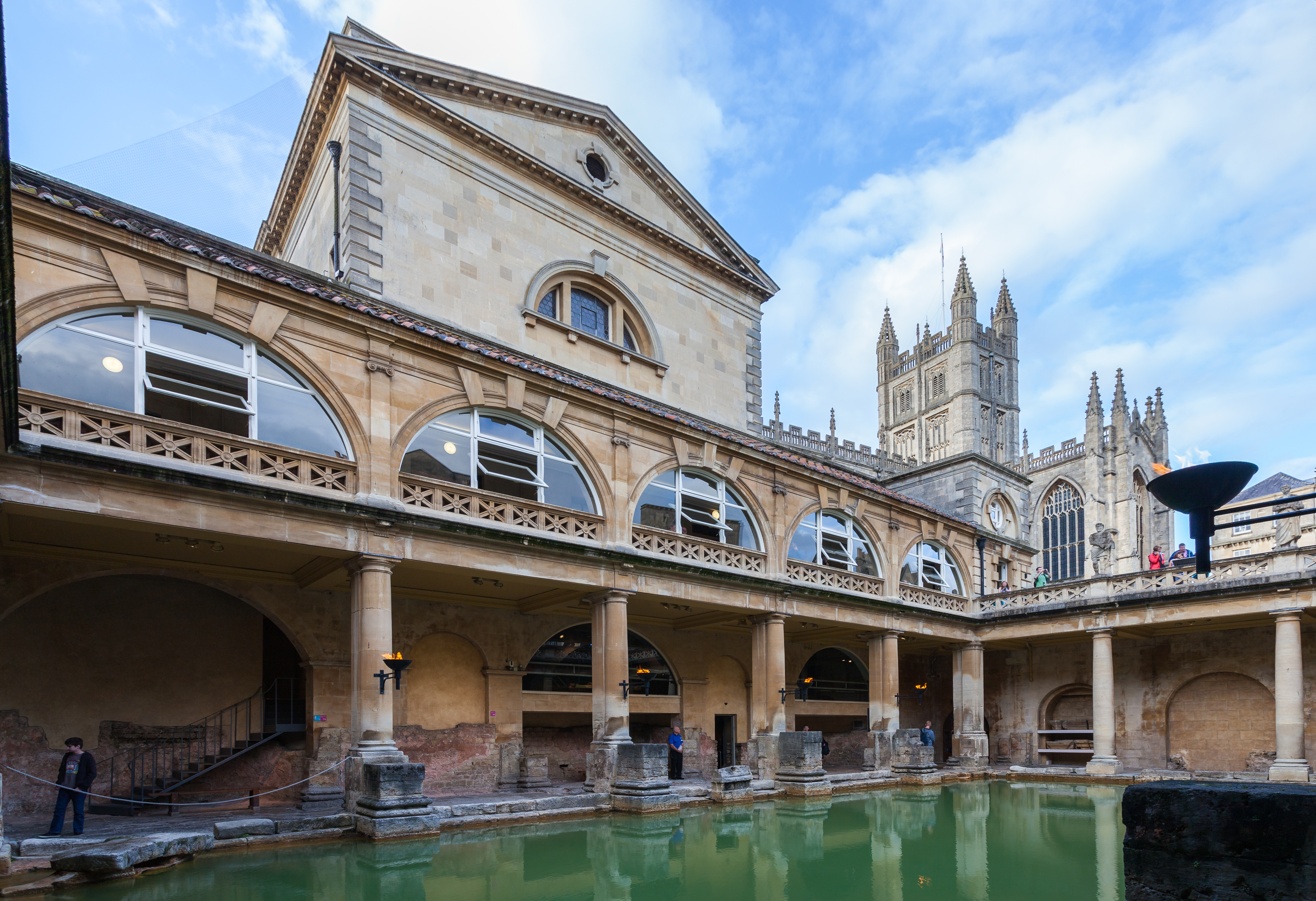
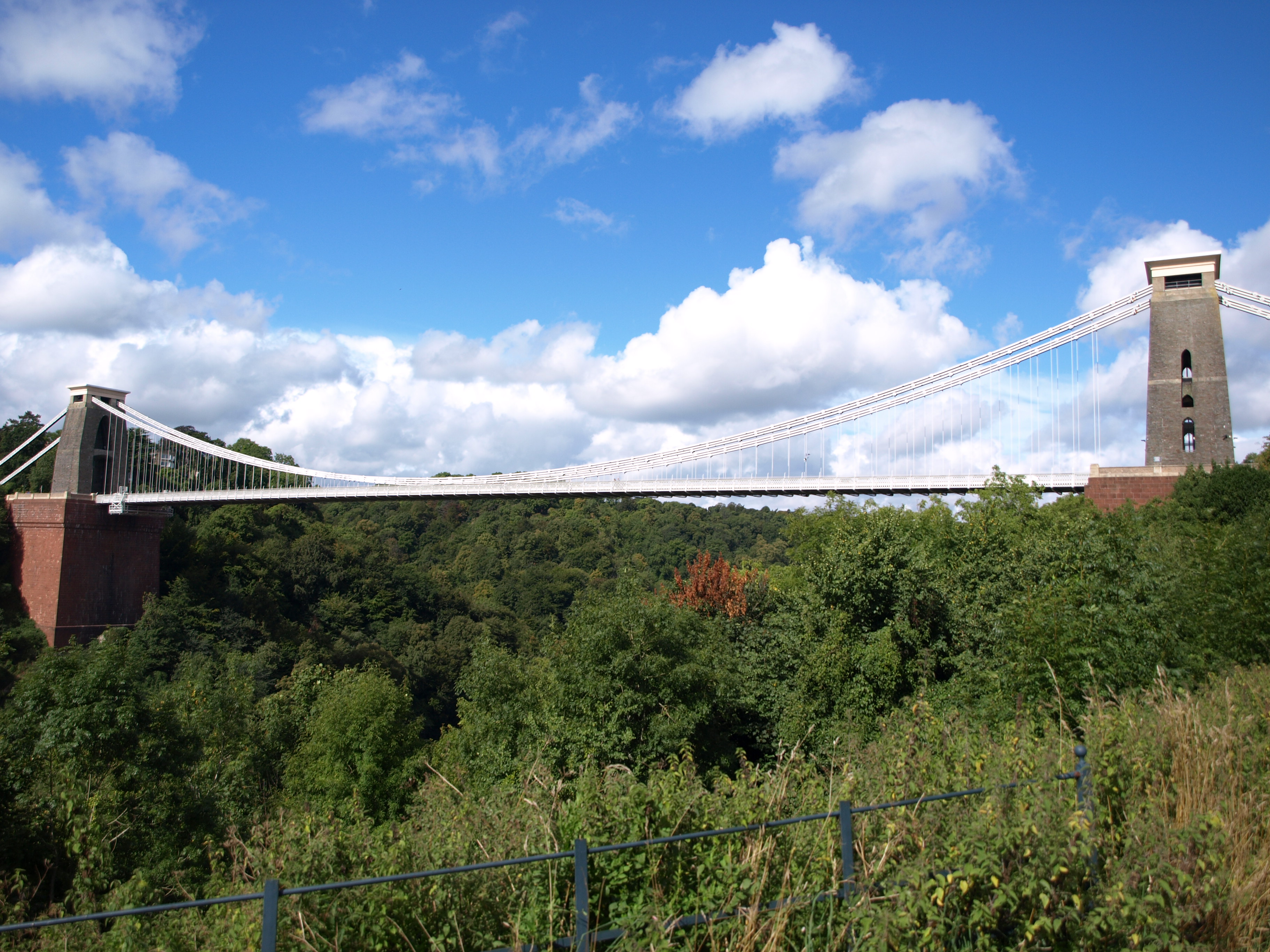
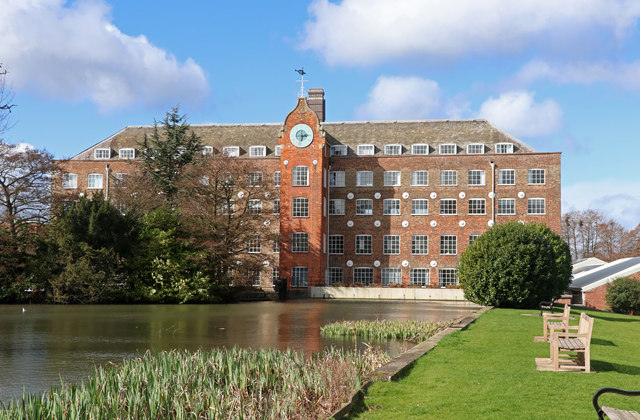
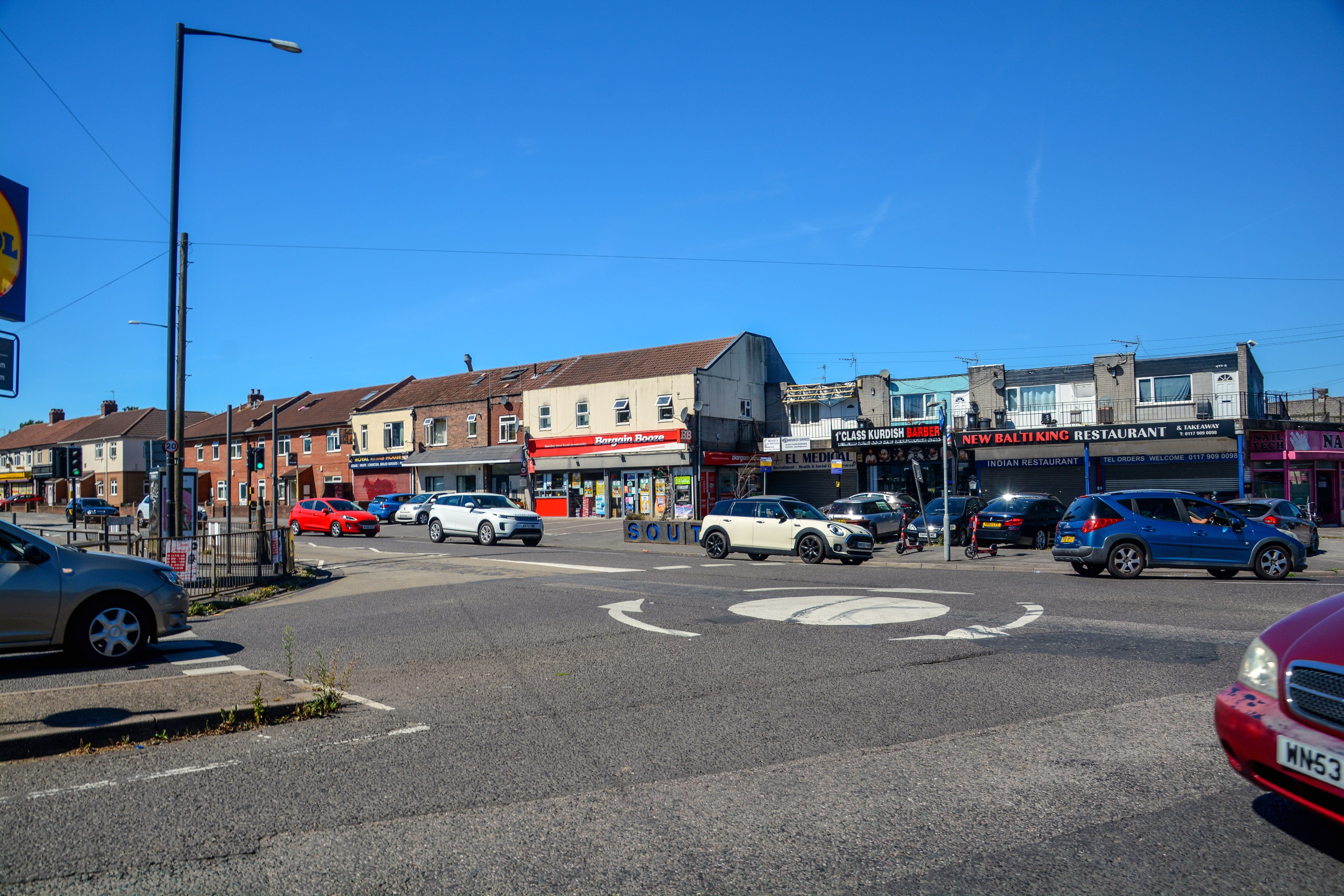
- Top left to bottom right: Bristol, Bath, Clifton, Kingswood and Filton

- Sovereign state: United Kingdom
- Country: England
- Region: South West England
- Counties: Bristol; Gloucestershire; Somerset
- Administrative HQ: Bristol (3 Rivergate, Temple Quay)
- Boroughs: Unitary authorities: Bristol; South Gloucestershire; Bath and North East Somerset

Government
  - Type: Combined authority
  - Body: West of England Combined Authority
  - Mayor: Helen Godwin (Labour)

Area
  - Total: 368 sq mi (953 km^{2})

Population (2024)
  - Total: 1,000,759
  - Rank: 5th
  - Density: 2,720/sq mi (1,051/km^{2})
- Time zone: UTC+0 (Greenwich Mean Time)
  - Summer (DST): UTC+1 (British Summer Time)
- Website: www.westofengland-ca.gov.uk

The West of England is a strategic authority area in England, located around Bristol. It is governed by the West of England Combined Authority, consisting of the unitary authorities of Bristol, South Gloucestershire, and Bath and North East Somerset. The combined authority is led by the Mayor of the West of England Helen Godwin. The city of Bristol is the region's largest population centre. Before the region, from 1974 until 1996, the area was under the County of Avon with North Somerset.

== Background ==
The West of England Combined Authority (1–3) and North Somerset (4), which together covered the former County of Avon, in South West England.

The term has been used in the Bristol and Bath area since at least the 18th century. The Royal Bath and West of England Society was named the Bath and West of England Society in 1790. The Royal West of England Academy received its present title in 1913. More recently the term has been used by organisations such as the West of England Partnership, Connexions West of England, and the West of England Sport Trust, as a synonym for the former Avon area, which existed as a local government unit between 1974 and 1996. Some aspects of transport planning and policy are coordinated using the Travelwest logo.

The West of England Combined Authority is a combined authority for the area, originally intended to comprise the local authorities of the former county of Avon, including Bristol, South Gloucestershire, Bath and North East Somerset and North Somerset, but North Somerset declined to participate. The combined authority is led by a Mayor, following the first election in May 2017. The government's stated vision is to create a "Western Powerhouse" analogous to the government's Northern Powerhouse concept. It is said that the proposal could bring nearly £1 billion of investment to the region.

The term is also used by the University of the West of England, the Royal West of England Academy, and by voluntary groups and clubs such as the West of England Bridge Club, all of which are based in or near Bristol.

== See also ==
- Avon (county)
- Greater Bristol
- West of England Combined Authority
- West Country
- South West England
- Great Western Cities
