= 2017 West of England mayoral election =

First mayoral election in the West of England

- 4 May 2017
- Turnout: 29.7%
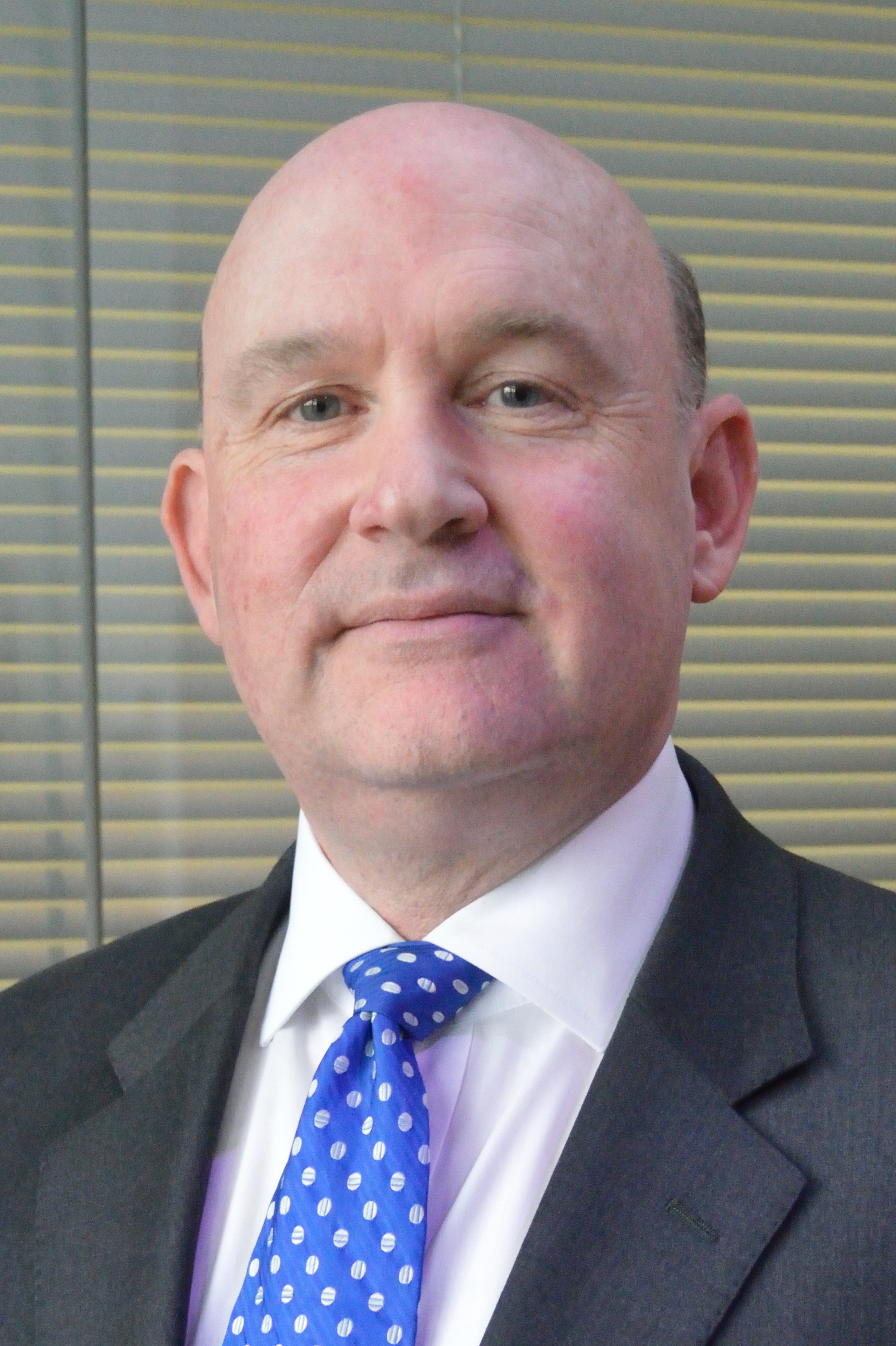

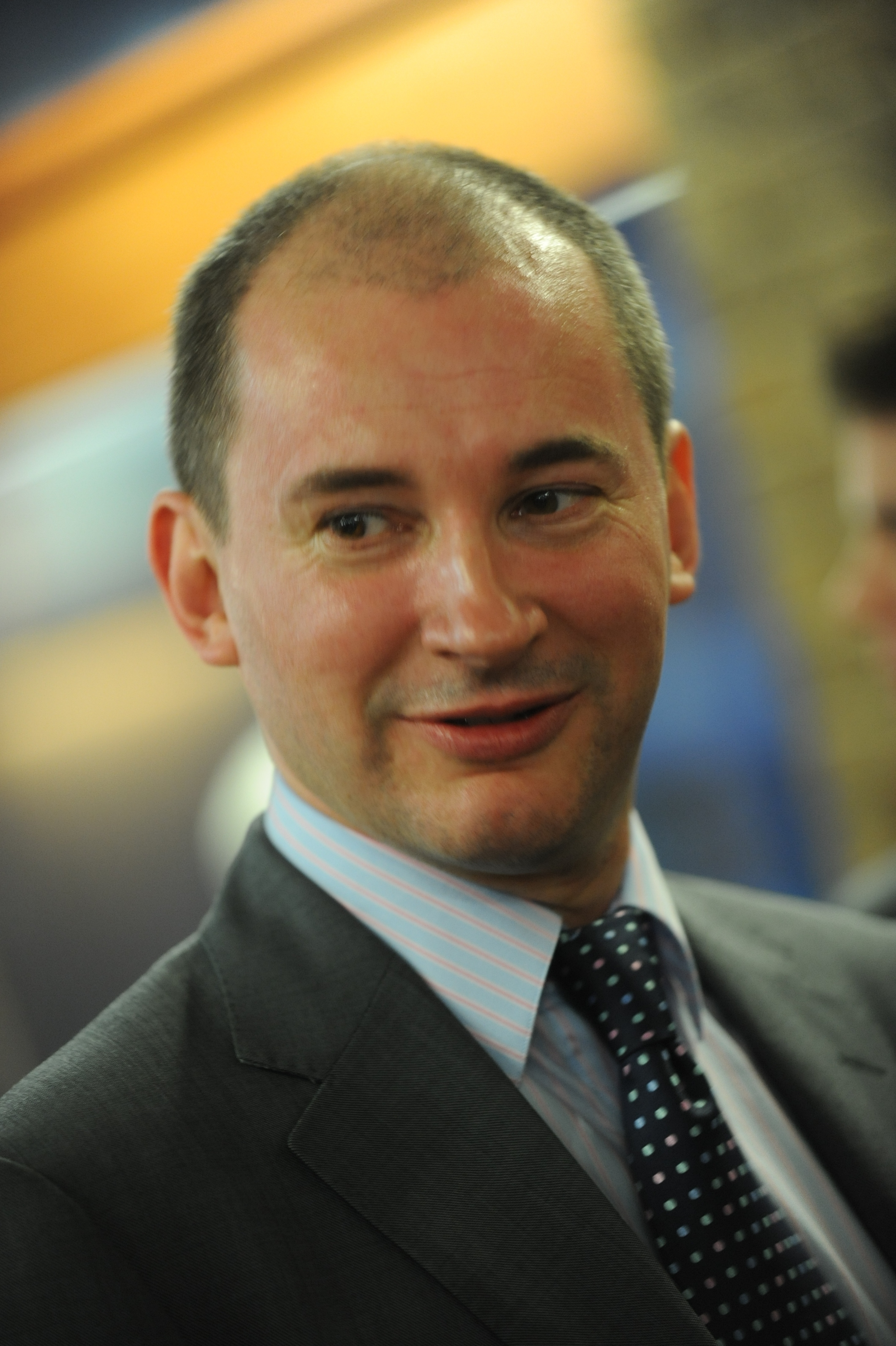

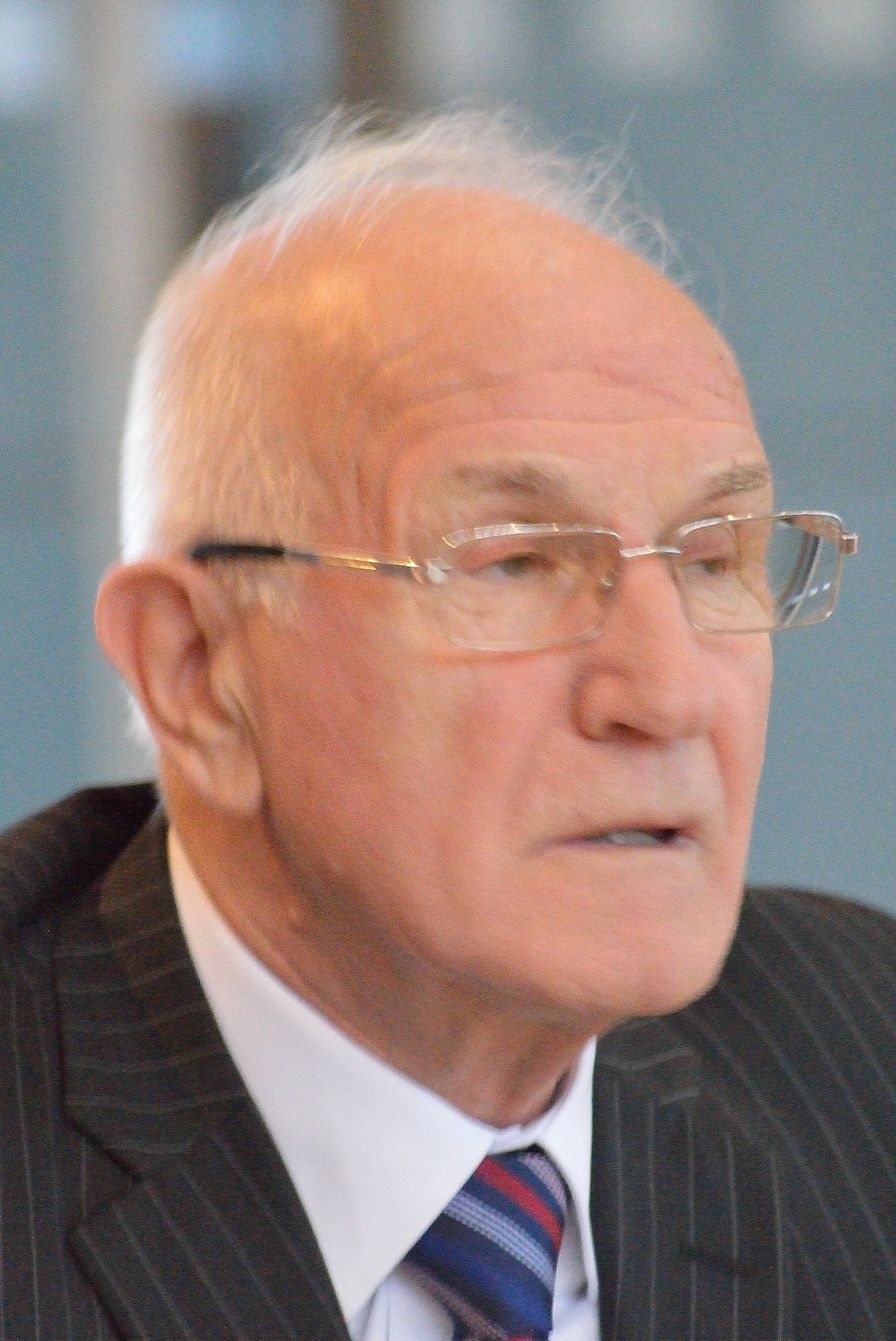

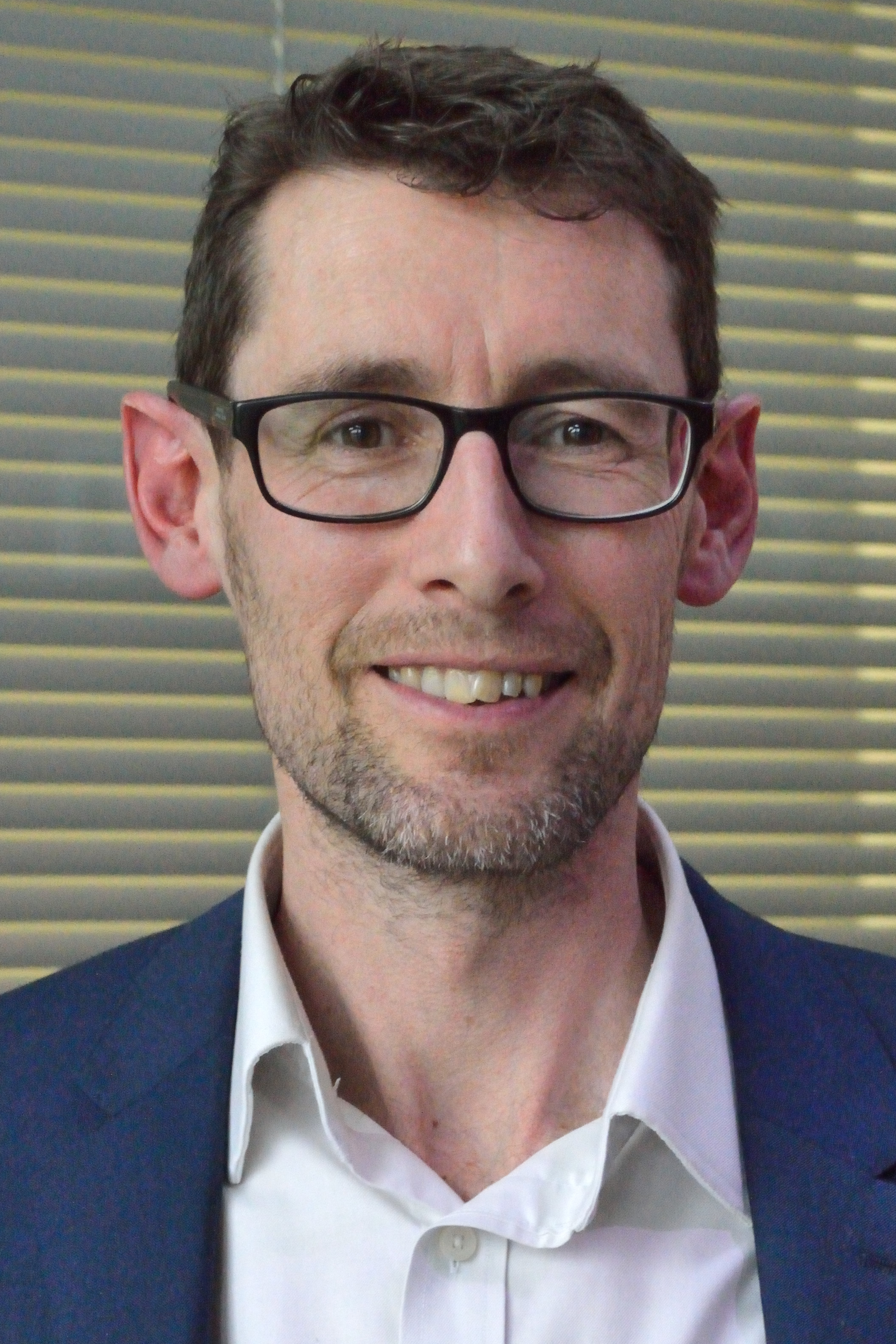
Candidate	Tim Bowles	Lesley Mansell	Stephen Williams
Party	Conservative	Labour Co-op	Liberal Democrats
First round vote	53,796	43,627	39,794
Percentage	27.3%	22.2%	20.2%
Second round vote	70,300	65,923	Eliminated
Percentage	51.6%	48.4%	Eliminated
Candidate	John Savage	Darren Hall
Party	Independent	Green
First round vote	29,500	22,054
Percentage	15.0%	11.2%
Second round vote	Eliminated	Eliminated
Percentage	Eliminated	Eliminated
- Map of the results of the mayoral election by council
Mayor before election
Position established
Elected Mayor
Tim Bowles
Conservative

The inaugural West of England mayoral election was held on 4 May 2017 to elect the Mayor of the West of England metropolitan area. The area is made up of Bath and North East Somerset, Bristol and South Gloucestershire. Subsequent elections will be held every four years. The election was won by Conservative Tim Bowles. The overall turnout for the election was low, with only 29.7% of the electorate voting.

== Background ==
The election coincided with the creation of the West of England Combined Authority, made up of the Bath and North East Somerset, Bristol and South Gloucestershire council areas. North Somerset was not part of the Combined Authority, as its council voted against the devolution deal in June 2016.

== Procedure ==
Bristol City Council acted as the Combined Authority Returning Officer. Formal nominations to stand could be made from 28 March 2017 to 4 April 2017.

This election used the supplementary voting system, with electors having two votes. One vote for the first choice candidate, with an optional vote for a second choice candidate used if no candidate has more than 50% of the first choice votes.

== Campaign ==
Independent John Savage proposed the development of a "super tram network" for the Combined Authority if elected, as part of a larger public transport policy. He also pledged to write to Channel 4 to ask the channel to consider moving to the West of England. Labour candidate Lesley Mansell promised greater protection for private tenants against "unscrupulous" landlords and 4,000 new homes a year. Conservative Tim Bowles pledged to build more affordable homes and protect the green belt. Liberal Democrat candidate Stephen Williams launched a range of policies with Vince Cable, including rolling out broadband to the region's villages and getting rid of the Severn Bridge toll. Bowles, Mansell and Williams all advocated making the region attractive for business. UKIP's Aaron Foot promised to build an online direct democracy platform, and to "end the war on motorists".

== Candidates ==
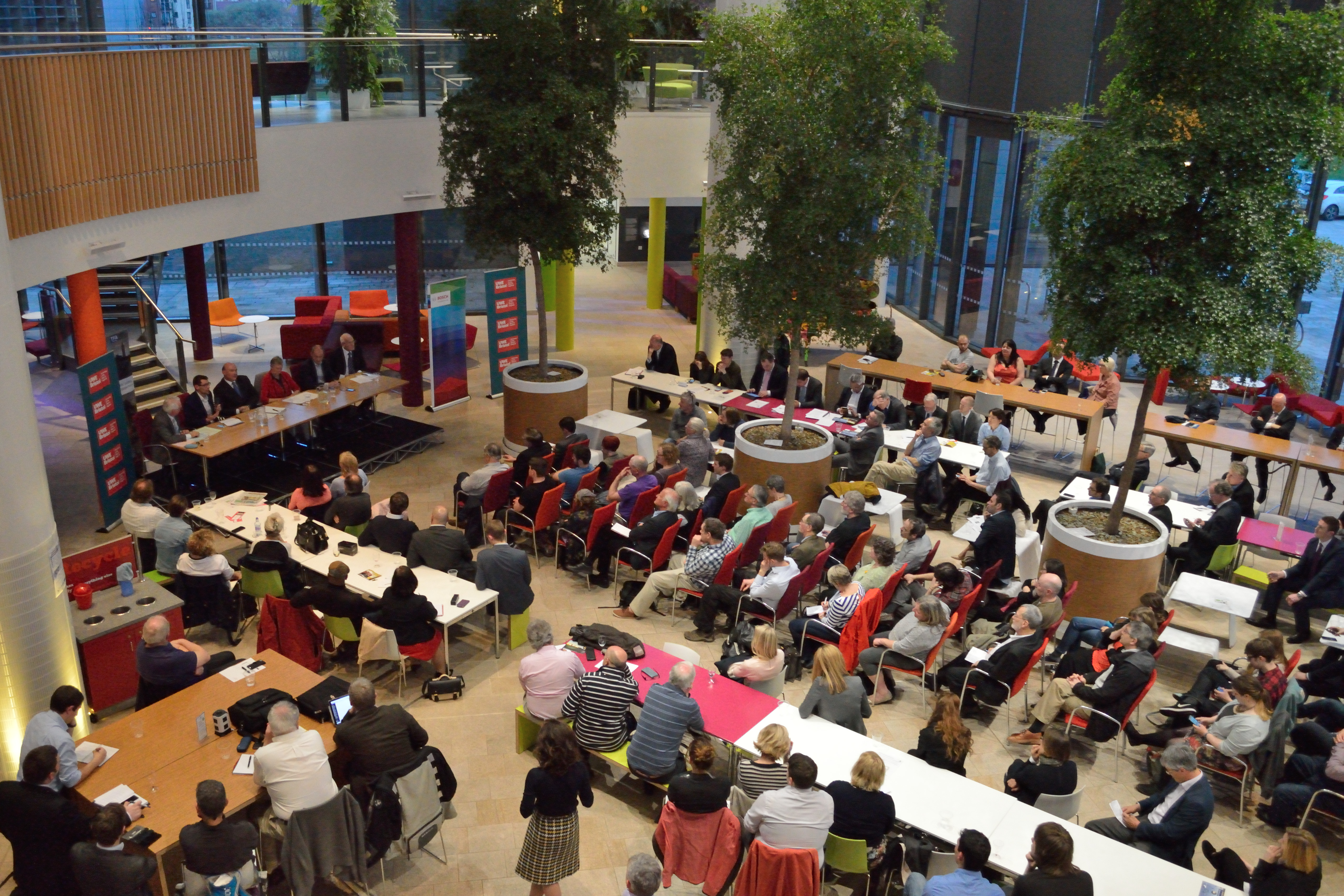
Candidates' Transport Infrastructure Debate at the Bristol and Bath Science Park

Six candidates stood in the election.

=== Conservative Party ===
Tim Bowles, events company manager, South Gloucestershire councillor.

=== Green Party ===
Darren Hall, former RAF engineering officer, project manager, former Parliamentary candidate in Bristol West.

=== Labour Party ===
Lesley Mansell, NHS manager, Westfield parish councillor and former Peasedown St John parish councillor.

=== Liberal Democrats ===
Stephen Williams, chartered tax consultant, former MP for Bristol West and Parliamentary Under Secretary of State for Communities and Local Government.

=== UK Independence Party ===
Aaron Foot, farmer, Coleford parish councillor, 2016 candidate for Avon & Somerset Police and Crime Commissioner.

=== Independent ===
John Savage, businessman, chair of University Hospitals Bristol NHS Foundation Trust and Bristol Chamber of Commerce and Initiative, treasurer of Bristol Cathedral, 2012 Labour candidate for Avon & Somerset Police and Crime Commissioner.

== Results ==
=== Overall ===
West of England Mayoral Election 2017
Party	Candidate	1st round		2nd round			1st round votesTransfer votes, 2nd round
Party	Candidate	Total	Of round	Transfers	Total	Of round	1st round votesTransfer votes, 2nd round
Conservative	Tim Bowles	53,796	27.3%	16,504	70,300	51.6%	
Labour Co-op	Lesley Mansell	43,627	22.2%	22,296	65,923	48.4%	
Liberal Democrats	Stephen Williams	39,794	20.2%				
Independent	John Savage	29,500	15.0%				
Green	Darren Hall	22,054	11.2%				
UKIP	Aaron Foot	8,182	4.2%				
Majority					4,377	2.2%	
Turnout		196,953	29.7%				

=== By local authority ===
==== Bath and North East Somerset ====
West of England Mayoral Election 2017 (Bath and North East Somerset)
Party	Candidate	1st round		2nd round			1st round votesTransfer votes, 2nd round
Party	Candidate	Total	Of round	Transfers	Total	Of round	1st round votesTransfer votes, 2nd round
Conservative	Tim Bowles	13,103	32.1%	3,343	16,446	61.2%	
Liberal Democrats	Stephen Williams	10,021	24.6%				
Labour Co-op	Lesley Mansell	6,137	15.0%	4,309	10,446	38.8%	
Independent	John Savage	5,530	13.6%				
Green	Darren Hall	4,398	10.8%				
UKIP	Aaron Foot	1,604	3.9%				
Majority					6,000	22.3%	
Turnout		40,793	30.5%				

==== Bristol ====
West of England Mayoral Election 2017 (Bristol)
Party	Candidate	1st round		2nd round			1st round votesTransfer votes, 2nd round
Party	Candidate	Total	Of round	Transfers	Total	Of round	1st round votesTransfer votes, 2nd round
Labour Co-op	Lesley Mansell	29,676	29.6%	13,935	43,611	63.5%	
Liberal Democrats	Stephen Williams	20,675	20.6%				
Conservative	Tim Bowles	18,146	18.1%	6,917	25,063	36.5%	
Independent	John Savage	14,467	14.4%				
Green	Darren Hall	13,857	13.8%				
UKIP	Aaron Foot	3,354	3.3%				
Majority					18,548	27.0%	
Turnout		100,175	31.1%				

==== South Gloucestershire ====
West of England Mayoral Election 2017 (South Gloucestershire)
Party	Candidate	1st round		2nd round			1st round votesTransfer votes, 2nd round
Party	Candidate	Total	Of round	Transfers	Total	Of round	1st round votesTransfer votes, 2nd round
Conservative	Tim Bowles	22,547	40.3%	6,244	28,791	70.8%	
Independent	John Savage	9,503	17.0%				
Liberal Democrats	Stephen Williams	9,098	16.3%				
Labour Co-op	Lesley Mansell	7,814	14.0%	4,052	11,866	29.2%	
Green	Darren Hall	3,799	6.8%				
UKIP	Aaron Foot	3,224	5.8%				
Majority					16,925	41.6%	
Turnout		55,985	27.1%				
