= West of England Combined Authority =

Strategic authority and combined authority in England

West of England Mayoral Combined Authority

- West of England combined authority area within England

Type
- Type: Combined authority of West of England
- Houses: Unicameral
- Term limits: None

History
- Founded: 9 February 2017

Leadership
- Mayor of the West of England: Helen Godwin, Labour since 2 May 2025
- Chief Executive: Stephen Peacock since 2024

Structure
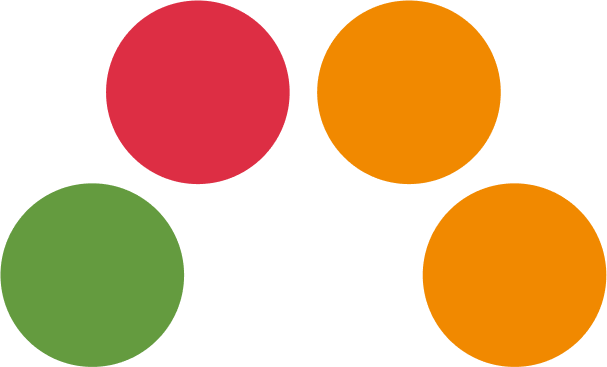
- Political groups: Liberal Democrats (2) Labour (1) Green (1)

Elections
- Voting system: Indirect election, directly elected mayor from 2017
- Last election: 1 May 2025
- Next election: 3 May 2029

Meeting place
- 70 Redcliff Street, Bristol, BS1 6AL

Website
- www.westofengland-ca.gov.uk

The West of England Combined Authority (WECA), branded as the West of England Mayoral Combined Authority, is a combined authority within the West of England area, consisting of the local authority areas of Bristol, South Gloucestershire, and Bath and North East Somerset.

The combined authority has its headquarters in the Redcliffe area of Bristol, and is led by the mayor of the West of England. The most recent mayoral election took place on 1 May 2025, when the Labour candidate Helen Godwin was elected on a turnout of 30%.

Since December 2024, the combined authority has branded itself as the West of England Mayoral Combined Authority. Its statutory name remains the West of England Combined Authority.

== Establishment ==
Map showing the three constituent boroughs within South West England, alongside North Somerset which rejected the deal

Devolution of certain powers to the West of England was announced by the UK government in the 2016 budget. The government's vision was to create a "Western Powerhouse" analogous to the Northern Powerhouse concept. It is claimed that the proposal could bring nearly £1 billion of investment to the region over thirty years.

The original proposal was to cover the same area as the County of Avon which came into formal existence on 1 April 1974 and was abolished in 1996. However, in June 2016 North Somerset council rejected the proposal. Bristol, Bath and North East Somerset and South Gloucestershire councils agreed to proceed without them.

The devolution deal, via the West of England Combined Authority Order 2017, came into force on 9 February 2017. The first public meeting of the combined authority took place on 1 March with an interim chair, followed by the first mayoral election in May.

== Population ==
The region covered by the combined authority had a population estimated at 950,000 in 2020. The authority also works closely with North Somerset Council; the joint area had a population in 2020 of 1,165,600.

== Responsibilities ==
The authority's functions, as specified by the West of England Combined Authority Order, mostly cover planning, skills and local transport. In April 2017. the authority published a 207-page constitution which includes terms of reference for the body and its committees. An updated constitution was agreed on 15 July 2019 and 9 June 2020.

As of 2026, WECA does not have 'established strategic authority' status – the highest level of devolution – which would enable it to have greater control over funding through an integrated settlement. Since WECA was issued with a 'best value' notice for the 12 months ending March 2025, because of disruptive relations between the then-mayor and WECA members, the body is blocked from gaining this status until at least November 2026.

=== Planning, economy and skills ===
Responsibilities include:

- Strategic planning, including a Spatial Development Strategy which will act as the framework for managing planning across the West of England region.
- Control of a new additional £30 million a year funding allocation over 30 years, to be invested in the West of England Single Investment Fund, to boost growth.
- The 19+ Adult Education budget, which was devolved from the 2019/20 academic year.

=== Transport ===
The mayor and combined authority are responsible for a consolidated, devolved local transport budget, with a multi-year settlement. They can franchise bus services, subject to necessary legislation and local consultation.

The authority promotes the West of England Joint Local Transport Plan, which includes the MetroBus network and the MetroWest rail project. The fourth iteration of the plan was published in March 2020.

A Key Route Network of local authority roads is managed and maintained by the combined authority on behalf of the Mayor.

Travelwest is a transport information and advice service promoted by the WECA authorities as well as North Somerset.

In early 2023, about 40 of the 69 subsidised bus routes were expected to be withdrawn due to reductions in the local transport levy, but a new on-call minibus "demand-responsive transport" service would be launched using new government funding which could only be spent on "new and innovative" services. The mayor said he was not yet convinced that using the new bus franchising model introduced by the Bus Services Act 2017, similar to arrangements in London, is suitable for the area, but he would monitor how well franchising works in Manchester when rolled out from 2023 though WECA was not carrying out any detailed analysis of this option.

== Budget ==
In 2018–19 the authority's income was £26.3m, of which £13m was from levies on the local authorities for WECA's transport functions and £7m came in grants. Expenditure was £25.3m, of which £12.8m was spent on concessionary fares and £1.7m on community transport; £2.6m was transferred to reserves and £2.9m was contributed to the Mayoral Fund. From this fund, which also received £17.6m from business rates, the mayor spent £12m on highways and £7m on transport, as well as £0.7m on the Joint Spatial Plan.

In the October 2021 budget the UK government allocated £540 million to WECA over a five-year period for public transport improvements, to be predominantly spent on improving bus services.

WECA spent £9.6 million on staffing in 2022–23 and the mayor requested £17.6 million for 2023–24, increased largely to deliver new projects from the additional government transport funding and to cover strategic transport planning responsibility transferred to WECA from constituent councils. After negotiations with council leaders in January 2023, £800,000 of the proposed increase was withheld.

== Membership ==
The membership of the combined authority cabinet is as follows:

Name	Position	Assumed office
Helen Godwin	Mayor of the West of England (West of England Combined Authority)	2025
Kevin Guy	Leader of Bath and North East Somerset Council	2021
Tony Dyer	Leader of Bristol City Council	2024
Maggie Tyrrell	Leader of South Gloucestershire Council	2025

Former South Gloucestershire Council leader Matthew Riddle was chosen to be interim chair of the combined authority until the first elected mayor took office on 8 May 2017, when Marvin Rees was chosen to be vice-chair.

As of April 2019, the authority employed 84, including the staff of the West of England Local Enterprise Partnership and the 'Invest in Bristol and Bath' team.

In 2021, there was a dispute between the members and the Mayor of the West of England over the mayor's powers, in particular a power to veto alternative proposals to the joint committee including North Somerset Council. The four local authorities' monitoring officers, who give legal advice, stated the veto could arguably amount to maladministration. On 15 October 2021, the four council leaders did not attend a WECA meeting with the mayor, which meant over £50 million of spending decisions could not be made. In November 2021, after taking new legal advice, Norris agreed not to claim veto powers on decisions involving North Somerset.

In September 2024, North Somerset Council submitted an expression of interest in formally joining the West of England Combined Authority. Following the 2025 mayoral election, the leader of North Somerset Council, Mike Bell, began attending meetings of the combined authority as the next step towards North Somerset possibly formally joining the combined authority. Residents of North Somerset backed plans to join the WECA in a public consultation in April 2026. If approved by ministers, North Somerset Council could join the WECA in either 2026 or 2027.

The mayor is a member of the Mayoral Council for England and the Council of the Nations and Regions.

== History ==
In 2022, WECA moved from offices near Bristol Temple Meads railway station, to larger offices in a four-storey building in nearby Redcliffe.

In May 2022, WECA's external auditors, Grant Thornton, initiated an investigation into strained relationships within WECA, after identifying a consequent "risk of significant weakness" in value-for-money arrangements. Grant Thornton also examined the issue of senior staff leaving, which they considered could be "highly problematic". WECA's draft 2021/2022 accounts show it spent nearly £9 million on staff salaries, £892,000 over budget. The auditors' report became available to the public in November 2022. It criticised WECA leaders for having a "poor state of professional relationships", and found five "significant weaknesses" in value-for-money arrangements. It made three legally-binding "statutory recommendations", two "key recommendations" and four "implementation recommendations". Grant Thornton issued such recommendations in only 3% of local authority reports it made that year. The Department for Levelling Up, Housing and Communities placed WECA on a monitoring watchlist, so if there is not improvement this could result in a "best value" improvement panel being imposed or government best value inspectors taking over control of WECA. WECA was issued a "best value" notice by DLUHC in March 2024. The government officially released WECA from "special measures" in March 2025.

In August 2023, the chief executive since WECA's establishment, Patricia Greer, left in an agreed resignation with a confidentiality agreement and a £219,000 payment, equivalent to 16 months of pay and settling a grievance complaint against the mayor. Greer had been on paid leave of absence since November 2022, during which a contractor interim chief executive was in place. The total cost of the exit, including for the interim chief executive and legal costs was £453,000. In November 2024, BBC News reported that there had been an exodus of senior staff from WECA, with several sources telling the BBC there was a "toxic culture of fear" in WECA. The mayor stated he had joined "a dysfunctional organisation, it [the problem] was happening before I arrived".

In April 2025, following Dan Norris' arrest on suspicion of rape, child sex offences, child abduction and misconduct in a public office, the leaders of the member Councils issued a statement reassuring people that the combined authority's "important work" continues and that "effective decision-making at the combined authority remains in place". Under emergency powers in the WECA constitution, the chief executive Stephen Peacock could make decisions on behalf of the combined authority. Norris himself was banned from entering the WECA headquarters in Bristol, and had his access to the Combined Authority's IT system deactivated. While he was also banned from attending meetings on behalf of WECA, he was not suspended as mayor because "there is no provision" under WECA's constitution for this action. Staff at WECA were also offered support, if they had "been impacted by this news or just want to speak with someone".

== Potential changes ==
In 2018, Mayor Tim Bowles voiced hope that North Somerset would join the combined authority, saying: "We work closely on a regular basis with Nigel [Ashton, then leader of the council] and his officers on a number of things. Personally I hope they do, and there are lots of people in North Somerset who hope they do too". In October 2020 there were discussions around North Somerset joining the WECA in time for the May 2021 election; but Marvin Rees, mayor of Bristol, turned down this proposal in early 2021. He rejected it on the basis that there should be a financial offer from the government for the council's inclusion, and stated that he would like to see North Somerset joining in the future. In 2020, North Somerset Council leader Don Davies said he regretted the decision not to join. In 2021, newly elected mayor Dan Norris stated his interest in not only North Somerset joining, but also the rest of Somerset.

George Ferguson, mayor of Bristol from 2012 to 2016, suggested in 2019 that his former role should be abolished and the combined authority renamed the "Bristol and Bath City Region", saying "Even when I stood for Bristol mayor back in 2012 I said I would prefer that we had a metro mayor. But a directly elected mayor for Bristol is what we had on offer from the government at the time".

In 2024, local transport funding in England faced potential cuts that could disrupt bus and train improvements, prompting regional mayors to advocate for budget protection amid a significant government shortfall.

In March 2026, the leaders of Gloucestershire County Council and five district councils in Gloucestershire wrote a letter to local government ministers outlining the ambition for a new Gloucestershire unitary authority to join the West of England Combined Authority. In August 2026, Mayor Helen Godwin outlined that the addition of Gloucestershire to WECA was unlikely in the near future but would not rule it out, stating that presently it was not a focus of WECA. Godwin stated that expansion of WECA to North Somerset was an immediate priority.

== Elections ==
Elections for the West of England Mayor have been held every four years since 2017. The first two elections (2017 and 2021) were held using the supplementary vote system. In this system, voters rank the candidates in order of preference, and candidates with the fewest first preference votes are eliminated, with their secondary preferences reallocated to the remaining candidates, until a single candidate has a majority (more than half) of the votes cast.

In 2025, elections were held using the voting system of first past the post, where the candidate with the most votes wins. In 2024, the Electoral Reform Society described the change as lowering the bar for politicians and thus damaging British democracy.

== See also ==
- Avon County Council
