= Dan Norris =

British politician (born 1960)

Dan Norris MP
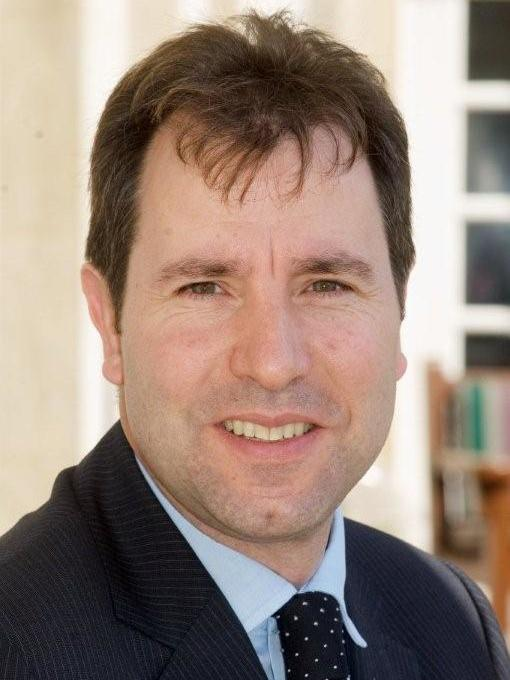
- Norris in 2009

Mayor of the West of England
- In office 10 May 2021 – 4 May 2025
- Preceded by: Tim Bowles
- Succeeded by: Helen Godwin

Member of Parliament for North East Somerset and Hanham Wansdyke (1997–2010)
- Incumbent
- Assumed office 4 July 2024
- Preceded by: Constituency established
- Majority: 5,319 (10.4%)
- In office 1 May 1997 – 12 April 2010
- Preceded by: Jack Aspinwall
- Succeeded by: Constituency abolished

Parliamentary Under-Secretary of State for Rural Affairs and Environment
- In office 9 June 2009 – 11 May 2010
- Prime Minister: Gordon Brown
- Preceded by: Joan Ruddock
- Succeeded by: Richard Benyon

Personal details
- Born: 28 January 1960 (age 66) London, England
- Party: Independent (2025–present)
- Other political affiliations: Labour (until 2025)
- Education: University of Sussex (MA)
- Website: Official website

Dan Norris (born 28 January 1960) is a British politician who has served as the Member of Parliament (MP) for North East Somerset and Hanham since 2024. He previously served as Mayor of the West of England from 2021 to 2025, and as the MP for Wansdyke from 1997 to 2010.

An independent, he was formerly a member of the Labour Party, until he was suspended in April 2025 after being arrested by Avon and Somerset Police on suspicion of rape, child sex offences, child abduction and misconduct in a public office.

Norris served in government as the Parliamentary-Under Secretary of State for Rural Affairs and Environment from 2009 to 2010, and an Assistant Whip from 2001 to 2003. Norris was elected to Parliament for North East Somerset and Hanham in the 2024 general election, defeating Jacob Rees-Mogg, who had defeated him in the 2010 election.

== Early life ==
Norris was born on 28 January 1960 in London to David and June Norris. June was a Labour councillor who contested the Northavon parliamentary constituency at the 1983 and 1992 general elections. David was a sales manager and social worker.

Norris was brought up in Winterbourne, south Gloucestershire, and was educated at Chipping Sodbury School and the University of Sussex, where he received a Master of Arts in social work in 1988. He worked as a teacher and child protection officer, having trained with the NSPCC.

== Before Parliament ==
Norris was a councillor on Bristol City Council for the Brislington West ward from 1989 to 1992 and from 1995 to 1997, and a councillor on Avon County Council from 1994 to 1996. He was a member of the GMB trade union.

== First parliamentary career ==
Norris first stood for parliament in the constituency of Northavon in 1987, losing against the Conservative incumbent, John Cope. In 1992, he was the Labour candidate for Wansdyke in Somerset, coming in second place against the Conservative incumbent, Jack Aspinwall. He contested the Wansdyke seat again in the election of 1997, and this time succeeded in taking it with a majority of 4,799, overturning a Conservative majority of 11,770 votes. Norris went on to increase his majority to 5,613 in the election of 2001.

Norris had an interest in child safety and regularly campaigned against paedophiles. In 1999 he launched a booklet in the House of Commons to educate parents about paedophiles, published by the charities Kidscape, Childline and the Lucy Faithful Foundation; it had a foreword written by Prime Minister Tony Blair. The guide was distributed to 1.5 million parents in his constituency and nearby areas. Since 1998, Norris had advocated in parliament for the introduction of a UK version of Megan's Law, which would enable parents and head teachers to inquire in a controlled way if high-risk sex offenders lived in their area, leading to the first UK trial of such a scheme in his constituency in 2007 before later widespread adoption as the Child Sex Offender Disclosure Scheme. In 2005 Norris co-wrote, produced and distributed a booklet, Don't Bully Me, giving practical advice to children in the UK on dealing with bullying.

Norris was an assistant whip for the Treasury from June 2001 to June 2003. In May 2006 he was appointed Parliamentary Private Secretary (PPS) to Secretary of State for Northern Ireland Peter Hain until June 2007, then PPS to Foreign Secretary David Miliband to January 2009. In the reshuffle of June 2009, Norris entered government as a minister for the first time, becoming Parliamentary Under Secretary of State at the Department for the Environment, Food and Rural Affairs (Minister for Rural Affairs and Environment).

Norris had long campaigned against fox hunting, supporting the legislation outlawing it. On the final day of legal fox hunting, 28 February 2005, he was accosted by Duke of Beaufort's Hunt supporters in an incident at Badminton which was shown live on regional television news.

The 2005 general election saw his lead over the Conservatives fall to 1,839. In changes made by the Boundary Commission for England, the Wansdyke constituency underwent moderate boundary changes and was renamed North East Somerset ahead of the 2010 election. Norris stood in the new seat but was defeated by the Conservative candidate Jacob Rees-Mogg.

== Post-first parliamentary term ==
Following his defeat at the 2010 general election, Norris worked for David Miliband in his unsuccessful bid for the Labour leadership. In May 2012, Norris was shortlisted to be the Labour Party candidate for the Bristol mayoral election, but did not win the selection. From 2013 to 2017 Norris was a director of Blakemere plc, whose largest planned operation was logging in West Papua, Indonesia, and he has run other businesses. In 2016 he was head of operations for the Russell Group of universities. Norris was critical of Jeremy Corbyn's leadership of the Labour Party's handling of antisemitism, stating in an op-ed for the Bristol Post, "today's Labour leadership seems to have become highly uncomfortable in opposing racism when it is directed at Jewish people".

In 2004, Norris was appointed to the board of the Snowdon Trust, a charity that supports students with physical disabilities. Norris was an ambassador for the children's charity Kidscape.

Norris was also a trustee of the League Against Cruel Sports (LACS), becoming chairman in October 2022. During his chairmanship, Norris faced criticisms of political interference, with the then Chief Executive Andy Knott accusing Norris of putting pressure on him to "keep quiet" if Labour dropped its commitment to close loopholes in existing fox-hunting laws. A group of former LACS members operating under the name Save the League called for Norris to resign as Chair, and Knott resigned as chief executive in June 2024 after claims of a "sustained harassment campaign". Norris ultimately resigned as chairman following his arrest in April 2025, and in that month a case was initiated in the High Court against LACS and Norris, in his role as chairman, by Knott for harassment and bullying.

== Mayor of the West of England ==
=== Candidacy ===
Norris was selected as the Labour Party candidate for the Mayoralty of the West of England on 16 November 2020, defeating Bristol councillor Helen Godwin in a vote of local members by 1,611 votes to 1,558. During the election campaign, the leader of the Labour Party Keir Starmer visited Bath to campaign with him. They were asked to leave a pub by its landlord, who opposed the use of lockdowns as part of the government's response to the COVID-19 pandemic.

During the election campaign, Norris said that incumbent mayor Tim Bowles was the "only metro mayor who doesn't have more powers than when he started", and that if elected he would seek more money and powers from central government. He said he would establish a "Green Recovery Fund" to create 23,000 jobs by investing in "home retrofitting, tree-planting, flood and drought defences, and renewable energy".

=== Mayoralty ===
Norris was elected as the mayor of the West of England in the 2021 mayoral election, a role which had previously been held by the Conservative Tim Bowles. Upon taking office, he became entitled to the style of Mayor. He credited his victory to the leadership of Keir Starmer. He said he would support North Somerset and parts of Somerset joining the combined authority, and he would seek additional funds for them.

In his first public meeting of the West of England Combined Authority (WECA), Norris vetoed a proposal supported by the leaders of the three constituent councils to spend £100,000 reviewing how the authority functions and makes decisions. At a meeting in July, Norris and the council leaders rejected most of a climate action plan that the authority had been developing since 2019 as insufficiently ambitious, and agreed to begin developing a replacement. Also in July 2021, Norris launched new schemes to support the creative and food industries in the region.

There was a dispute between WECA members and Norris over the mayor's powers, in particular a power to veto alternative proposals to their joint committee which included North Somerset Council. The four local authorities' monitoring officers, who give legal advice, stated the veto could arguably amount to maladministration. On 15 October 2021, the four council leaders did not attend a WECA meeting with the mayor, which meant over £50 million of spending decisions could not be made. Norris stated: "I would agree that [my predecessor] gave into them, I am not prepared to do that ... I'm not really bothered about procedures or legal arguments, frankly. I'm determined to get policies through and things delivered." A former non-voting member of WECA, Vice-Chancellor of the University of the West of England Professor Steve West, was appointed as mediator in the dispute. In November 2021, after taking new legal advice, Norris agreed not to claim veto powers on decisions involving North Somerset.

Following the publication of the Grant Thornton report, the Department for Levelling Up, Housing and Communities placed WECA on a monitoring watchlist, so if there is not improvement this could result in a "best value" improvement panel being imposed or government best value inspectors taking over control of WECA. WECA was issued a "best value" notice by DLUHC in March 2024. The government announced WECA had been released from "special measures" in March 2025.

In November 2021, Norris signed WECA up to a charter committing to support staff diagnosed with terminal illness, and urged organisations across the West of England to do likewise. He supported a strike by the University and College Union in Bristol in December 2021.

In September 2024, it was announced that Norris would be ineligible to seek re-election, following proposals adopted by the Labour government extend a ban on councillors remaining in their local government roles if they are elected to the House of Commons to other office holders, including Mayors.

Following Norris' arrest in April 2025, The Telegraph published the results of an October 2023 staff survey, which highlighted accusations against the Mayor of bullying and harassment at the WECA office. The survey raised concerns that there was "a need to 'protect officers from the mayor'" and noted there had been an "unprecedented level of turnover" within some teams because of Norris's "actions and decisions". The Telegraph also stated that Labour leader Keir Starmer had been warned before the 2024 election that prospective MP Norris was facing legal action for bullying and harassment, and that a formal complaint of harassment had been made to the Labour party. Labour's dispute team had responded that no investigation was possible due to "extant legal proceedings".

==== Spatial Development Strategy ====
A major responsibility of WECA and the mayor is the development of a Spatial Development Strategy (SDS), which would guide major planning decisions in the area and thus development direction. The SDS is subject to unanimous WECA vote. A somewhat similar Joint Spatial Plan was previously being developed by the area's unitary authorities in a four-year process, and included building three new "garden villages". In 2019, the plan was withdrawn after the Planning Inspectorate criticised it as not "robust, consistent or objective". Consequently, producing a SDS for WECA to agree became a priority for the new mayor. The SDS covers the period to 2041, and was to have a 12-week public consultation before a public examination by the Planning Inspectorate in early 2023.

In March 2022, Norris stated that the region's green belt was "not fit for purpose". He argued that while there should be no overall green belt area reduction, limited changes to extend urban areas in a few places should be permitted. At the time, there was a proposal by the owners of Bristol's Ashton Gate Stadium to build 500 homes on the neighbouring green belt as part of a "sporting quarter" development.

The mayor and the leader of South Gloucestershire council disputed the amount of new housing proposed in WECA's forthcoming SDS, publication of which was deferred. In May 2022, Norris told the government that agreement of a SDS was impossible, blaming South Gloucestershire council for leaving discussions, which was denied by South Gloucestershire's leader. Subsequently, the three councils started developing their own individual Local Plans, which Norris had described as "parochial".

==== Transport ====
In the October 2021 budget, the UK government allocated £540 million to WECA over a five-year period for public transport improvements, to predominantly be spent on improving bus services. This included £48 million for a park and ride scheme near the M32 strategic corridor from South Gloucestershire to Bristol. The funding is from the Department for Transport's City Region Sustainable Transport Settlements scheme.

The area does not have a rapid transit or tram system, so the bus service is the major form of public transport, which was widely viewed as giving a poor service. In November 2022, First West of England cut 1,500 services each week in Bristol, 5% of services, due to driver shortages. In 2022, the majority of Bristol councillors called on Norris to explore adopting the recently legislated bus franchising system in the area. In 2023, Norris rejected a WECA outline proposal for an underground rail system as he did not believe it was financially viable, and asked WECA staff to prepare a report evaluating the bus franchising option.

In November 2021, the combined authority submitted a plan for a "seamless" public transport system with a single brand and payment system across buses and trains and across different operators. South Gloucestershire Council asked for funding from WECA for a pedestrianisation scheme on Thornbury's high street, which Norris threatened to withhold unless the council further consulted residents.

In 2023, Norris announced the launch of a "Birthday Busses" scheme, a concessionary bus pass that would allow free travel on any bus route across the West of England during the month of their birthday. A WECA scrutiny committee was critical of the scheme, noting that the £8 million project was "benefiting the richest 10 per cent significantly more than the poorest 10 per cent". The scheme also faced allegations of potential unlawful use of public funds, with £10,000 spent on a advertising wrap for a bus, which included three large images of the Mayor and his dog. While the report said while there is no problem in principle with the promotion of the scheme, or associating the metro mayor with it, the size of the images "appears to explicitly seek to affect public support of the metro mayor", rather than promote the bus pass scheme. Norris defended the scheme, arguing that its uptake amongst middle class commuters were "precisely the people most needed to get out of their cars and onto public transport", and that the images needed to be so big as it was "used on a big bus". The scheme was extended for a second year in November 2024.

During his term, Norris worked on funding the reopening of passenger services on the Bristol to Portishead railway, as part of the existing MetroWest programme to improve local rail services. Funding was finally fully agreed with the government in February 2025.

== Return to Parliament ==
Norris was elected to Parliament at the July 2024 general election for North East Somerset and Hanham, which covered largely the same area as his former Wansdyke constituency, defeating Jacob Rees-Mogg in a rematch of their 2010 contest. He continued to hold the office of mayor of the West of England, although under "second job" rule changes implemented by the Labour Party in September 2024, he would not be able to stand for re-election as mayor in May 2025.

Following his arrest in April 2025, Norris was banned from the Parliamentary Estate while a risk assessment was undertaken. While this meant that he was unable to participate in parliamentary business, his constituency office remained open, and Norris continued to support constituents with local casework. From May 2025, Norris began to vote on legislation again using proxy voting, with Chris Elmore, the Welsh Labour Party MP for Bridgend, casting votes on Norris' behalf. With each proxy vote, Norris has always voted in line with the government. At the same time, he began to submit written questions to government ministers again. Elmore stopped casting proxy votes on Norris' behalf on 1 July 2026. Damien Egan, Labour MP for Bristol North, cast a proxy vote on Norris' behalf during the second reading of the Terminally Ill Adults (End of Life) Bill on 11 September 2026, but said he would "not do it again". Both Egan and Norris voted in support of the Bill.

In September 2025, a change.org petition was launched calling on Norris to step down and for a by-election to be held, arguing that, while Norris "is innocent until proven guilty", his ability to represent the constituency has been "diminished" because of the current circumstances. While indicative of public sentiment, the online petition is not a formal recall petition, which can only be triggered in specific circumstances and would give constituents six weeks to signify if they want their MP to be recalled, with a by-election called if more than 10 per cent of the local electorate sign the recall petition.

On 11 December 2025, with the petition garnering 1,437 signatures, Norris dismissed the calls to resign, arguing: "I will continue to represent my constituents on a broad range of issues. This includes handling casework and policy queries, asking parliamentary questions, voting, and staying across local and national developments." In January 2026, Anna Sabine, who represents the neighbouring constituency of Frome and East Somerset, said that her office was receiving requests from Norris' constituents asking for help. She explained that "I can't help constituents from other MPs' seats, and so I think there's a real challenge around how people in his constituency get served by their MP". Norris repeated his intention to not resign his seat in April 2026, after the online petition reached 3,600 signatures.

In an October 2026 interview with LBC, Sir Jacob Rees-Mogg criticised the decision to bar Norris from Parliament, saying it was "absolutely outrageous that a man representing 70,000 people is not allowed to do his job because the police took forever to investigate, and now the Crown Prosecution Service has not been able to come to a decision in months". Rape Crisis England & Wales responded to Rees-Mogg's comments, calling them "really problematic" and accusing Sir Jacob of "confusing a suspension with safeguarding".

== Arrest ==
In April 2025, Norris was arrested on suspicion of rape, child sex offences, child abduction and misconduct in a public office. In a statement, Avon and Somerset Police said: "Most of the offences are alleged to have occurred in the 2000s but we're also investigating an alleged offence of rape from the 2020s". He was released on conditional bail for enquiries to continue. He was suspended by the Labour Party on 4 April 2025.

On 8 April 2025, it was confirmed that Norris had been banned from the Parliamentary Estate while a risk assessment was being undertaken, following the accusations made against him. Norris was also banned from entering the WECA headquarters in Bristol, and had his access to the Combined Authority's IT system deactivated. While he was also banned from attending meetings on behalf of WECA, he was not suspended as mayor because "there is no provision" under WECA's constitution for this action.

On 12 November 2025, Avon and Somerset Police released an update confirming that Norris was still on police bail, and that enquiries remained ongoing. A spokesperson for Avon and Somerset Police said: "investigations into alleged sexual offences are sensitive and complex and as a result it can take a significant amount of time for enquiries to be completed".

On 2 February 2026, it was reported that he had been further arrested on suspicion of rape against a second woman, sexual assault against a third woman, as well as voyeurism and upskirting against a number of women. The police also stated they were no longer actively investigating any sexual offences against children. On 1 July 2026, Avon and Somerset Police confirmed that a file on the case had been submitted to the Crown Prosecution Service for them to consider a charging decision.

== Bibliography ==
- Violence Against Social Workers: The Implications for Practice, Jessica Kingsley Publishers, 1989 (with Carol Kedward). ISBN 978-1-85302-041-4

Parliament of the United Kingdom
Preceded by Jack Aspinwall	Member of Parliament for Wansdyke; 1997–2010	Constituency abolished Equivalent seat North East Somerset won by Jacob Rees-Mogg
New constituency	Member of Parliament for North East Somerset and Hanham; 2024–present	Incumbent
Political offices
Preceded by Tim Bowles	Mayor of the West of England; 2021–2025	Succeeded by Helen Godwin
