= Helen Godwin =

British politician

Mayor Helen Godwin
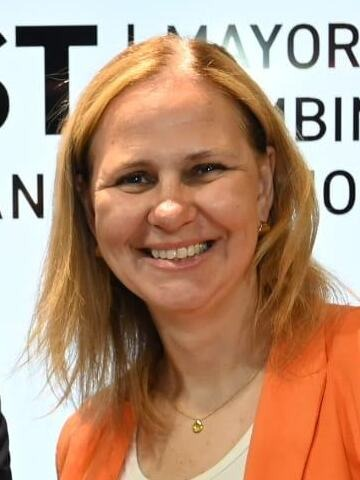
- Godwin in 2025

Mayor of the West of England
- Incumbent
- Assumed office 5 May 2025
- Preceded by: Dan Norris

Bristol City Councillor for Southmead
- In office May 2016 – December 2021

Personal details
- Party: Labour
- Children: 3
- Education: Liverpool John Moores University (BA)
- Website: helengodwin.com

Helen Jayne Godwin is a British politician who has served as Mayor of the West of England since 2025. She is a member of the Labour Party.

== Early life and education ==
Helen Godwin grew up in Begbrook, near Stapleton, Bristol, in what she states was a working class family, and went to Cotham School and Filton College. From 1994 to 1998 she took a degree in European Studies and Spanish at Liverpool John Moores University.

== Early political career ==
In her 20s, Godwin was a New Labour supporter and Labour blogger, although she left the Labour party for four years in protest at British involvement in the 2003 invasion of Iraq, which she called an illegal war.

Godwin (listed as Helen Godwin Teige) was elected to Bristol City Council, representing Southmead ward, in 2016. She was re-elected in 2021, and later served as cabinet member for women, young people and families under Marvin Rees. She announced her resignation as councillor in December 2021 due to work commitments from a new job.

In 2020, she ran to be the Labour candidate for the 2021 West of England mayoral election, but was defeated in a local party membership ballot by the former Labour MP for Wansdyke, Dan Norris.

== Mayor of the West of England ==
=== Candidacy ===
On 21 November 2024, Godwin was named as the Labour candidate for the 2025 West of England mayoral election. Her candidacy was endorsed by the Member of Parliament for Bristol North West, Darren Jones MP, and by the former Bristol Mayor Marvin Rees and his two deputies. Godwin was elected Mayor of the West of England on 1 May 2025 with 25.0% of the vote.

=== Mayoralty ===
Godwin stated that she would take a collaborative approach in the West of England Combined Authority (WECA), and that her three main priorities were:

- reliable buses and trains;
- affordable homes in the right locations;
- assisting in the creation of green jobs.

WECA was allocated £752 million by the government in the 2025 Spending Review, largely to be spent on transport over the spending review four year capital spending period.

In July 2025, Godwin authorised the recruitment of a "Head of Mass Transit", to lead on the creation of a proposal for a mass transit system, such as a tram, light rail or underground system which might extend to Bristol Airport. In 2026, she stated WECA was working on a 15-year plan for mass transit, with an ambition to start the first projects within five years. Godwin is considering both the franchising bus services model and the Enhanced Partnership Plus model for buses in the area, with the latter considered quicker to deploy with less financial risk for WECA.

In the Bristol Post review of her first 15 months as mayor, they considered her greatest achievement was obtaining the agreement of constituent councils to start a mass transit project for the area, something her predecessor mayors had not achieved. This will utilise the additional expertise of the government's new Mass Transit Taskforce in creating a detailed plan to attract additional government funding. The Post review also noted three other significant decisions: her refusal to fund Bristol's plan to ban through-traffic on Park Street because of traffic impact elsewhere, refusing to fund some Liveable Neighbourhood schemes, not funding a continuous bus lane on the dual-carriageway Keynsham bypass and instead supporting a 40 mph restriction and active travel path scheme. The mayor is also creating a mayoral development corporation north of Bristol, which will enable her to create a new town already shortlisted in government funding plans over local objections.

== Working career ==
In August 2021, Godwin started working for professional services company PricewaterhouseCoopers (PwC) in their consulting business in the government and health sectors.

Earlier in her working career, she worked for recruitment company Hays as business manager in the legal interims and paralegals division, and later as director and co-owner with her spouse of Redland Search, a recruitment company in Bristol.

== Personal life ==
Godwin moved back to Bristol from Tooting, London circa 2012. She and her spouse have three children. She regularly watches Bristol Rovers matches.

Political offices
Preceded by Dan Norris	Mayor of the West of England; 2025–present	Incumbent
