= Tim Bowles (politician) =

British politician (born 1959/60)

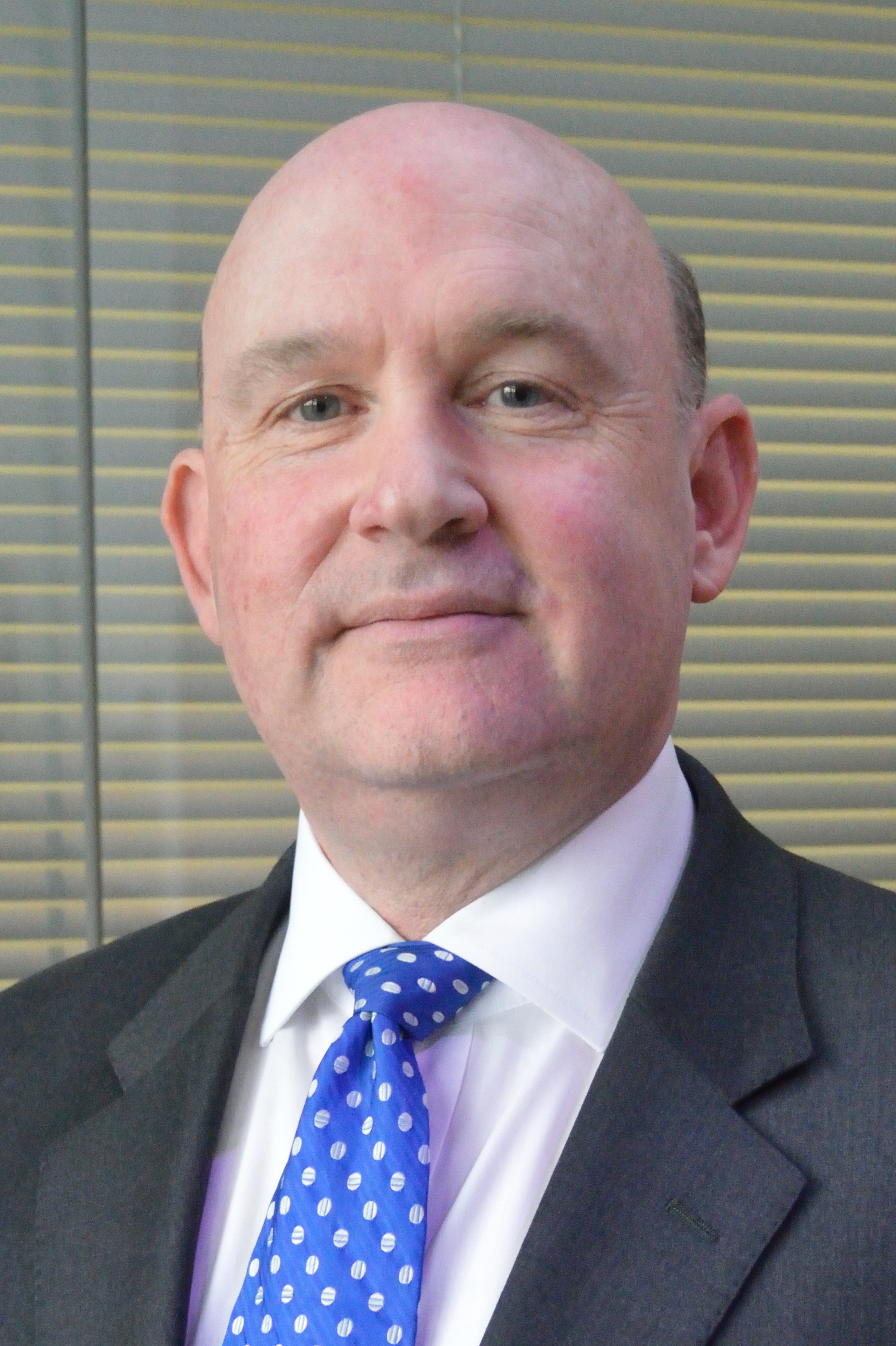
- Bowles in 2017

Mayor of the West of England
- In office 8 May 2017 – 9 May 2021
- Preceded by: Office established
- Succeeded by: Dan Norris

Personal details
- Born: 1959 or 1960 (age 66–67)
- Party: Conservative

Timothy Charles Bowles is a British Conservative politician who was the inaugural Mayor of the West of England serving from 2017 to 2021.

He was previously elected as a local councillor in 2010 and 2015 for Winterbourne in South Gloucestershire, where he lives. He was an events company manager for rth plc.

On 24 November 2020 Bowles announced his decision not to run for re-election in the 2021 West of England mayoral election, as he was retiring to "pursue some other interests and do those things which have had to take a back seat for so many years".

At Bowles' final West of England Combined Authority meeting, Bristol mayor Marvin Rees said that Bowles had shown honourable leadership without "nonsense party wrangling".

Bowles lives in Winterbourne, and previously in Somerset.
