= Mayor of the West of England =

Mayoral post in England

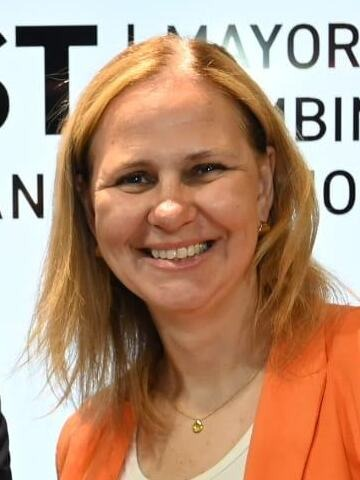
- Incumbent; Helen Godwin since 5 May 2025
- Style: Mayor
- Member of: West of England Combined Authority; Council of the Nations and Regions; Mayoral Council for England
- Residence: Rivergate House, 70 Redcliff St, Bristol
- Appointer: Electorate of the West of England
- Term length: 4 years
- Constituting instrument: Cities and Local Government Devolution Act 2016
- Inaugural holder: Tim Bowles
- Formation: 9 February 2017
- Salary: £87,000
- Website: WECA / The Mayor

The districts of the West of England Combined Authority

The mayor of the West of England is the directly elected strategic authority mayor who leads the West of England Combined Authority. The body, a combined authority, is responsible for strategic administration, including planning, transport and skills, across the local authority areas of Bristol, South Gloucestershire, and Bath and North East Somerset. The creation of the role was agreed in 2016 as part of a devolution deal, by the then Chancellor George Osborne and the leaders of the three councils.

The West of England Combined Authority Order 2017, which created the body with effect from 9 February 2017, specifies that mayoral elections are to be held every fourth year, commencing on 4 May 2017. At first, elections used the supplementary vote system, where electors voted for "first preference" and "second preference" candidates. If no candidate received a majority of first-choice votes, all but the two leading candidates were eliminated and the votes of those eliminated were redistributed according to their second-choice votes to determine the winner. The 2025 West of England mayoral election used first past the post as required by the Elections Act 2022.

The first election on 4 May 2017 was won by Tim Bowles with a total of 70,300 votes, including second preferences. The turnout was 29.7%, with 199,519 voting out of the possible 671,280.

The mayor is a member of the Mayoral Council for England and the Council of the Nations and Regions.

== List of mayors ==
Name	Portrait	Term of office		Elected	Political party	Previous and concurrent occupations
Tim Bowles		8 May 2017	9 May 2021	2017	Conservative	Former district councillor for Winterbourne
Dan Norris		10 May 2021	4 May 2025	2021	Labour	MP for North East Somerset and Hanham as of the 2024 general election. Former MP for Wansdyke from 1997 until 2010
Dan Norris		10 May 2021	4 May 2025	2021	Independent (from 5 April 2025)	MP for North East Somerset and Hanham as of the 2024 general election. Former MP for Wansdyke from 1997 until 2010
Helen Godwin		5 May 2025	Incumbent	2025	Labour	Former councillor for Southmead and cabinet member of Bristol City Council

Timeline

== Elections ==
=== 2025 ===
This election was run under first-past-the-post for the first time.

West of England Mayoral election 1 May 2025
Party	Candidate	Votes	%	±%
Labour	Helen Godwin	51,197	25.0%	▼8.4
Reform	Arron Banks	45,252	22.1%	N/A
Green	Mary Page	41,094	20.0%	▼1.7
Conservative	Steve Smith	34,092	16.6%	▼12.0
Liberal Democrats	Oli Henman	28,711	14.0%	▼2.3
Independent	Ian Scott	4,682	2.3%	N/A
Majority		5,945	2.9	▼1.9
Turnout		205,028	30.0	▼6.6
Registered electors		682,961		
Labour hold		Swing	▼15.3	

=== 2021 ===
West of England Mayoral election 6 May 2021
Party	Candidate	1st round		2nd round			1st round votesTransfer votes, 2nd round
Party	Candidate	Total	Of round	Transfers	Total	Of round	1st round votesTransfer votes, 2nd round
Labour	Dan Norris	84,434	33.4%	41,048	125,482	59.5	
Conservative	Samuel Williams	72,415	28.6%	12,974	85,389	40.5	
Green	Jerome Thomas	54,919	21.7%				
Liberal Democrats	Stephen Williams	41,193	16.3%				

=== 2017 ===
West of England Mayoral election 4 May 2017
Party	Candidate	1st round		2nd round			1st round votesTransfer votes, 2nd round
Party	Candidate	Total	Of round	Transfers	Total	Of round	1st round votesTransfer votes, 2nd round
Conservative	Tim Bowles	53,796	27.3%	16,504	70,300	51.6	
Labour	Lesley Mansell	43,627	22.2%	22,296	65,923	48.4	
Liberal Democrats	Stephen Williams	39,794	20.2%				
Independent	John Savage	29,500	15.0%				
Green	Darren Hall	22,054	11.2%				
UKIP	Aaron Foot	8,182	4.2%				

Turnout in the election was: 29.3%

== See also ==
- Mayor of Bath
- Mayor of Bristol
- History of local government in Bristol § Mayors
- West of England Combined Authority
