= Stephen Williams (British politician) =

British Liberal Democrat politician

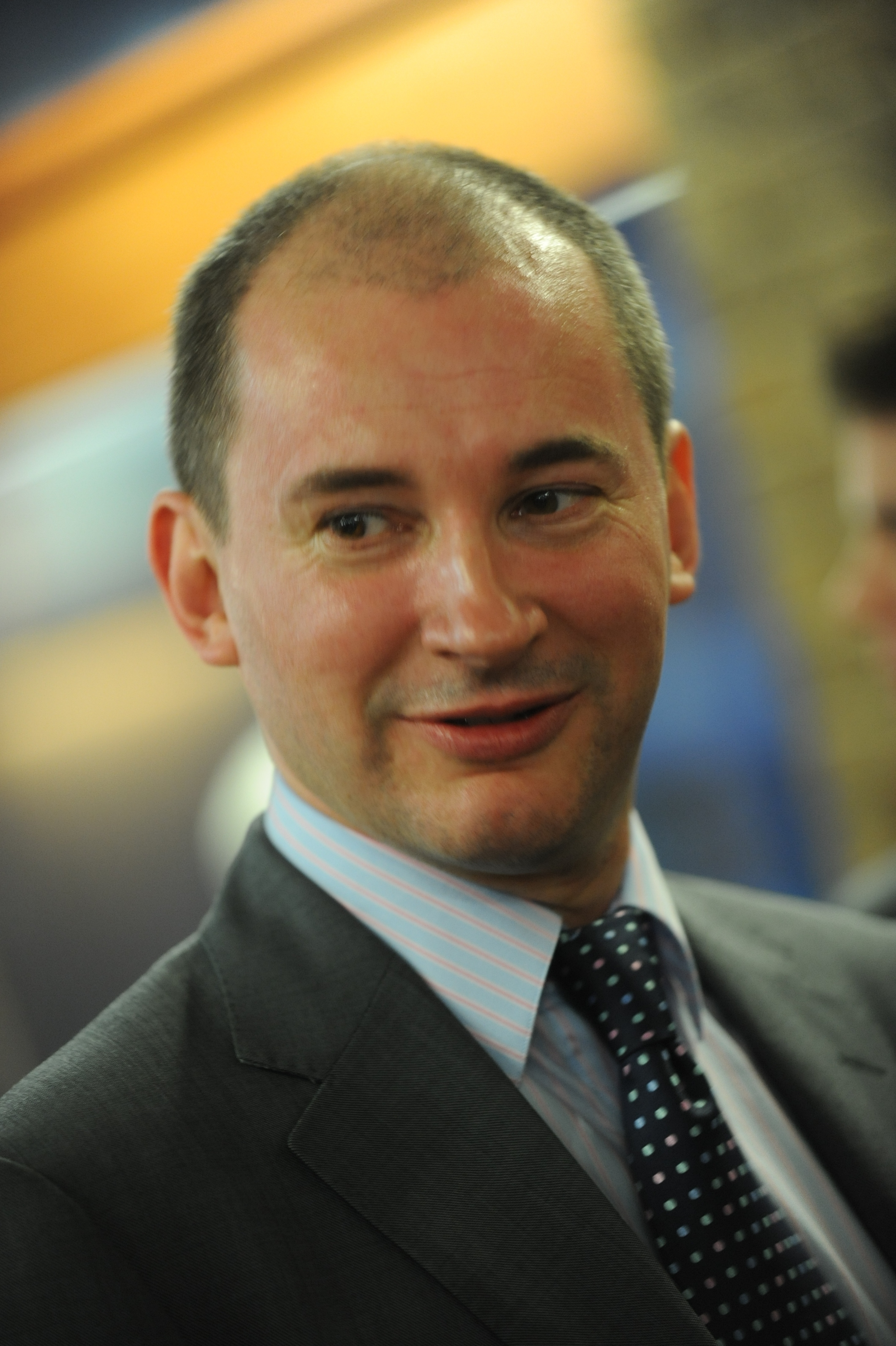
- Williams in 2008

Parliamentary Under Secretary of State for Communities and Local Government
- In office 7 October 2013 – 8 May 2015
- Prime Minister: David Cameron
- Preceded by: Don Foster
- Succeeded by: Marcus Jones

Liberal Democrat Shadow Secretary of State for Innovation, Universities and Skills
- In office 18 December 2007 – 13 May 2010
- Leader: Nick Clegg
- Preceded by: Sarah Teather
- Succeeded by: Sam Gyimah (2019)

Member of Parliament for Bristol West
- In office 5 May 2005 – 30 March 2015
- Preceded by: Valerie Davey
- Succeeded by: Thangam Debbonaire

Personal details
- Born: 11 October 1966 (age 60) Mountain Ash, Wales
- Party: SDP (until 1988); Liberal Democrats (1988–present)
- Education: University of Bristol
- Website: Official website

Stephen Roy Williams (born 11 October 1966) is a British Liberal Democrat politician who served as Member of Parliament (MP) for Bristol West from the 2005 general election until his defeat by Labour Party candidate Thangam Debbonaire in 2015. As an MP, he served in the Cameron–Clegg coalition government as Parliamentary under-secretary of state in the Department of Communities and Local Government from 2013 to 2015.

He came third in the inaugural 2017 West of England mayoral election, fourth in the 2017 general election where he sought re-election to his former seat of Bristol West, fourth in the 2021 West of England mayoral election, and second in the 2023 Hotwells and Harbourside councillor by-election. He is currently one of three Liberal Democrat councillors for the Westbury on Trym and Henleaze ward elected in the 2024 local elections.

== Early life and education ==
Stephen Roy Williams was born on 11 October 1966. He grew up in the village of Abercynon in the Cynon Valley in Glamorgan, Wales. He attended Mountain Ash Comprehensive School and the University of Bristol, where he graduated in 1988 with a degree in history. While at the University of Bristol he was President of the SDP/Liberal society, and an active member of the local SDP branch. He later qualified as chartered tax adviser. He worked for Coopers and Lybrand, which would later merge into PricewaterhouseCoopers, from 1988 to 1995. He worked as a tax manager for Kraft Jacobs Suchard in 1995, and in the same role for Grant Thornton from 1996 to 2001 in Cheltenham and Bristol, then as a tax accountant for various firms from 2001 to 2005.

== Political career ==
=== Before Parliament ===
Williams was elected to Avon County Council in 1993 for Cabot in central Bristol. The authority was abolished in 1996. He was elected to Bristol City Council in 1995, to the same Cabot ward. He remained a councillor until 1999, leading the Liberal Democrat group on the council from 1995 to 1997.

In the 1997 general election Williams stood as the Liberal Democrat candidate for Bristol South, where he came third with 13.4% of the vote. He was the Liberal Democrat candidate for Bristol West in 2001, when he came second with 28.9% of the vote, and again in 2005, when he gained it from the Labour MP Valerie Davey with 38.3% of the vote. He became the first MP from the Liberal Democrats or its predecessor parties to hold the seat, and the first Liberal or Liberal Democrat MP in Bristol since 1935, as well as the first openly gay Liberal Democrat MP. His victory was credited to the party's opposition to tuition fees and the Iraq War.

=== Member of Parliament ===
Following his election on 5 May 2005, then Liberal Democrat leader Charles Kennedy appointed Williams as the party's public health spokesperson, shadowing the public health minister Caroline Flint. In this role he served on the committee that scrutinised a health bill that introduced a ban on smoking in public places. Williams supported a ban on smoking in all public places, rather than an alternative proposal to exempt private clubs and pubs which do not serve food from the ban. He won an award from World Health Organization for his advocacy of a full ban. On 29 November 2005, Williams introduced a Ten Minute Rule bill to the House of Commons to reduce the voting age to 16. The motion was supported by a majority of Labour members and Liberal Democrats, but opposed by the Conservatives. It was defeated by 136–128 votes. In June 2006, Williams launched a campaign against homophobic bullying, after organising the education and skills select committee's first enquiry into bullying in schools.

In the 2006 Liberal Democrat leadership election Williams was the agent of Chris Huhne. Following the election, newly elected leader Menzies Campbell moved Williams to the further and higher education portfolio, shadowing minister Bill Rammell. After the reorganisation of government departments by new prime minister Gordon Brown in July 2007, Campbell reshuffled his team and Williams became the party's spokesperson on schools. Following the election of Nick Clegg as leader, whom Williams supported against Chris Huhne, Williams became the party's spokesperson for innovation, universities and skills. In 2008, Williams wrote a policy proposal that would allow top-up fees as part of his role as spokesperson for universities, but the proposal was rejected by the party's Federal Policy Committee. He later said that he had led several attempts to remove or moderate the party's policy to abolish tuition fees.

Williams held his seat in the 2010 general election with 48.0% of the vote. Williams served as chair of the All Party Parliamentary Group on Smoking and Health between July 2010 and October 2013. Between 2010 and 2013 he served as the Liberal Democrat Treasury spokesperson. In January 2013 Williams introduced a backbench committee motion to reduce the voting age. The motion was passed.

In October 2013, Williams was appointed Parliamentary Under Secretary at Department for Communities and Local Government (DCLG). As communities minister, his responsibilities included community cohesion, race relations, localism and community rights, empty homes, housing standards, building regulations, neighbourhood planning, climate change and sustainable development. In March 2014, Williams published the Government's proposals following the housing standards review, which recommended a rationalisation of government, local authority and industry housing standards into a national set. As Minister for Communities, Williams also announced new funding for promotion of the Cornish language and gave recognition to the people of Cornwall as a national minority on the same basis as the other Celtic people of the British Isles. In 2017, it emerged that Williams had responded to 2014 concerns from the All-Party Parliamentary Fire Safety and Rescue Group about the fire safety of Britain's tower blocks, especially the absence of sprinklers in many of these, by saying, "I have neither seen nor heard anything that would suggest that consideration of these specific potential changes is urgent and I am not willing to disrupt the work of this department by asking that these matters are brought forward." The correspondence was leaked to the BBC after the Grenfell Tower fire.

In the 2015 general election, Williams lost his seat to Labour Party candidate Thangam Debbonaire. He came third with 18.8% of the vote. Before the election, he said he was concerned about losing support amongst students for abstaining on the vote to increase tuition fees to £9,000 a year.

=== Post-Parliamentary career ===
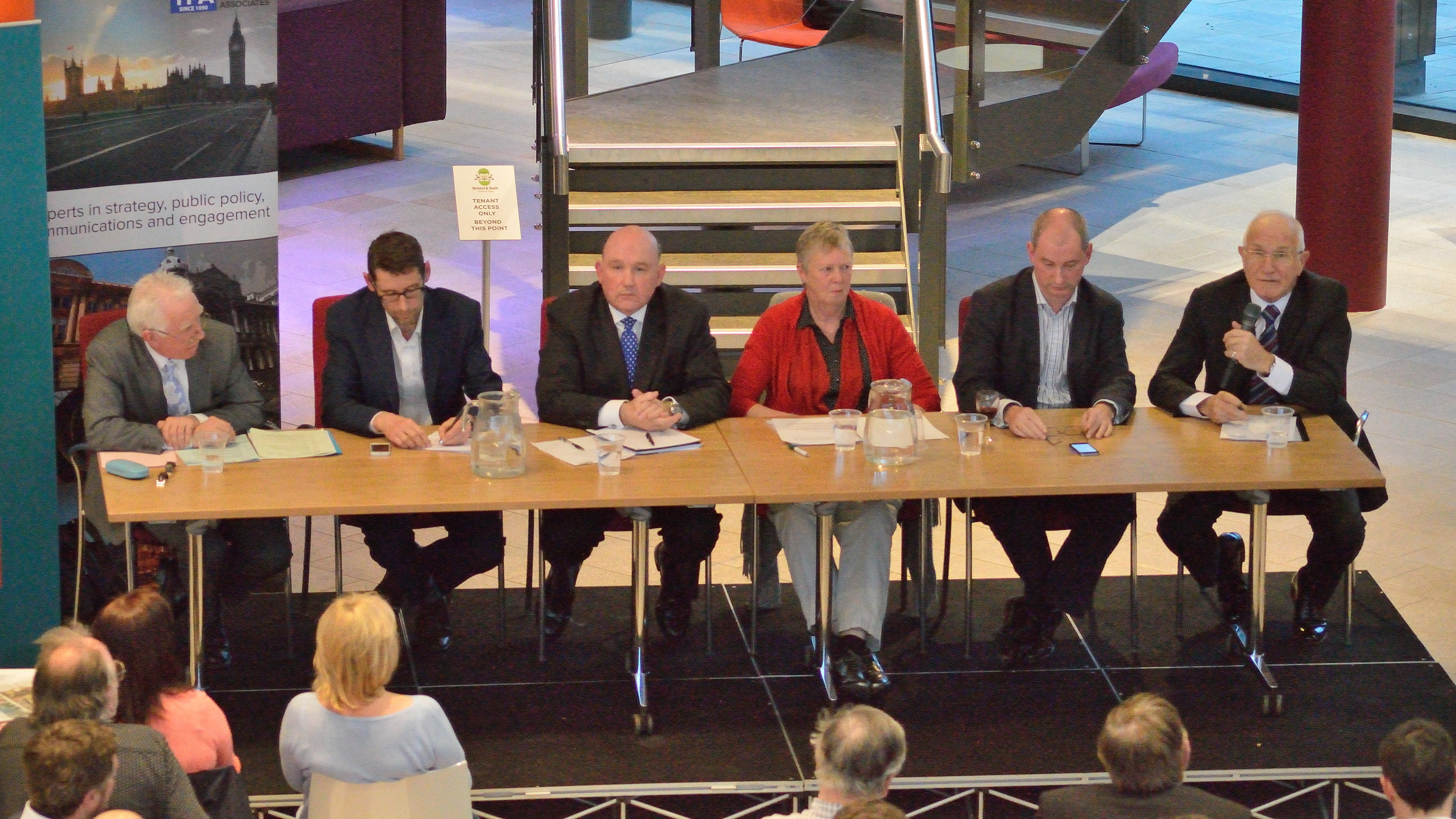
Williams in a 2017 West of England mayoral candidate Transport Infrastructure Debate at the Bristol and Bath Science Park

He was selected as the Liberal Democrat candidate in the 2017 West of England mayoral election, in which he came third with 20.2% of the vote. In the same year, he stood for his former seat of Bristol West, saying that the Liberal Democrat policy about UK membership of the European Union would mean he could win the seat back. He came fourth with 7.3% of the vote. In the 2019 European Parliament election, he was selected as the third candidate on the Liberal Democrat list for South West England. The list received 23.2% of the vote, with the two candidates ahead of him being elected. He was the Liberal Democrat candidate again in the 2021 West of England mayoral election. He came in fourth place, with 16.3% of the vote.

Williams was also selected as the Liberal Democrat candidate in the 2023 Bristol City Council by-election in the Hotwells and Harbourside ward, held after the sitting Liberal Democrat councillor resigned. Williams came second, with 40.85% of the vote, losing to the Green Party's Patrick McAllister on 42.93%. His loss made the Greens the largest group on the council.

In November 2023, it was announced that Williams would be one of three Liberal Democrat candidates for the Westbury-on-Trym & Henleaze Ward in the 2024 local elections.

== Personal life ==
Williams lives in St Andrews, Bristol.

He lists his interests as art and architecture, visiting heritage properties, genealogy, and collecting old postcards.

Williams is openly gay.

Parliament of the United Kingdom
Preceded by Valerie Davey	Member of Parliament for Bristol West; 2005–2015	Succeeded by Thangam Debbonaire
