= Child Abduction Act 1984 =

Act of the Parliament of the United Kingdom

Child Abduction Act 1984 (Note: Section 13(1).)
- Act of Parliament
- Parliament of the United Kingdom
- Long title: An Act to amend the criminal law relating to the abduction of children.
- Citation: 1984 c. 37
- Territorial extent: England and Wales (in part); Scotland (in part); Northern Ireland (in part); (Note: Section 12(3).)

Dates
- Royal assent: 12 July 1984
- Commencement: 12 October 1984 (Note: Section 13(2).)

Other legislation
- Amends: Offences against the Person Act 1861; Extradition Act 1870; Visiting Forces Act 1952; Firearms Act 1968
- Amended by: Law Reform (Parent and Child) (Scotland) Act 1986; Children Act 1989; Age of Legal Capacity (Scotland) Act 1991; Statute Law (Repeals) Act 1993; Children (Scotland) Act 1995; Access to Justice Act 1999; Adoption and Children Act 2002; Crime (International Co-operation) Act 2003; Criminal Justice and Immigration Act 2008; Policing and Crime Act 2009; Legal Aid, Sentencing and Punishment of Offenders Act 2012; Children and Families Act 2014; Criminal Justice (Scotland) Act 2016; Civil Partnership (Opposite-sex Couples) Regulations 2019; Sentencing Act 2020
- Relates to: Northern Ireland Act 1974

Status: Amended

Text of statute as originally enacted

Revised text of statute as amended

Text of the Child Abduction Act 1984 as in force today (including any amendments) within the United Kingdom, from legislation.gov.uk.

The Child Abduction Act 1984 (c. 37) is an act of the Parliament of the United Kingdom. It creates offences that replace, in England and Wales, the offence of child stealing under section 56 of the Offences against the Person Act 1861.

== Part I – Offences under the law of England and Wales ==
=== Section 1 – Offence of abduction of child by parent etc ===
Section 1(1) provides that, subject to sections 1(5) to (8), it is an offence for a person connected with a child under the age of 16 to take or send the child out of the United Kingdom without the appropriate consent.

The following cases are relevant to this section:

- R v C [1991] 2 FLR 252, [1991] Fam Law 522, CA
- R v Sherry and El Yamani [1993] Crim LR 536, CA

Sentence

See section 4(1).

See the Crown Prosecution Service sentencing manual.

And see R v Brennan [2007] 2 Cr App R (S) 50

=== Section 2 – Offence of abduction of child by other persons ===
Section 2(1) provides that, subject to section 2(3), it is an offence for a person, other than one mentioned in section 2(2), to take or detain a child under the age of sixteen so as to remove him from the lawful control of any person having lawful control of him, or, so as to keep him out of the lawful control of any person entitled to lawful control of him. without lawful authority or reasonable excuse.

This section is disapplied by section 51 of the Children Act 1989 for any child who has been certified at risk and placed in a foster or care home.

The following cases are relevant:

- R v Leather, 98 Cr App R 179, CA
- R v Berry [1996] Crim LR 574, The Times, 29 January 1996, CA

Sentence

See section 4(1).

See the Crown Prosecution Service sentencing manual.

And see the following cases:

- R v Dean [2000] 2 Cr App R (S) 253
- R v Mawdsley [2001] 1 Cr App R (S) 101
- R v Delaney [2003] 2 Cr App R (S) 81
- R v J A and others [2002] 1 Cr App R (S) 108
- R v Prime [2005] 1 Cr App R (S) 45
- R v Delaney [2007] 1 Cr App R (S) 93
- R v Serrant [2007] 2 Cr App R (S) 80
- R v M [2008] 2 Cr App R (S) 73

== Part III – Supplementary ==
=== Section 13 – Short title, commencement and extent ===
Section 13(2) provides that the Act came into force at the end of the period of three months that began on the day on which it was passed. The word "months" means calendar months.

The day (that is to say, 12 July 1984) on which the Act was passed (that is to say, received royal assent) is included in the period of three months.

This means that the Act came into force on 12 October 1984.

== See also ==
- Child abduction
