= Marvin Rees, Baron Rees of Easton =

British politician (born 1972)

The Right Honourable The Lord Rees of Easton OBE
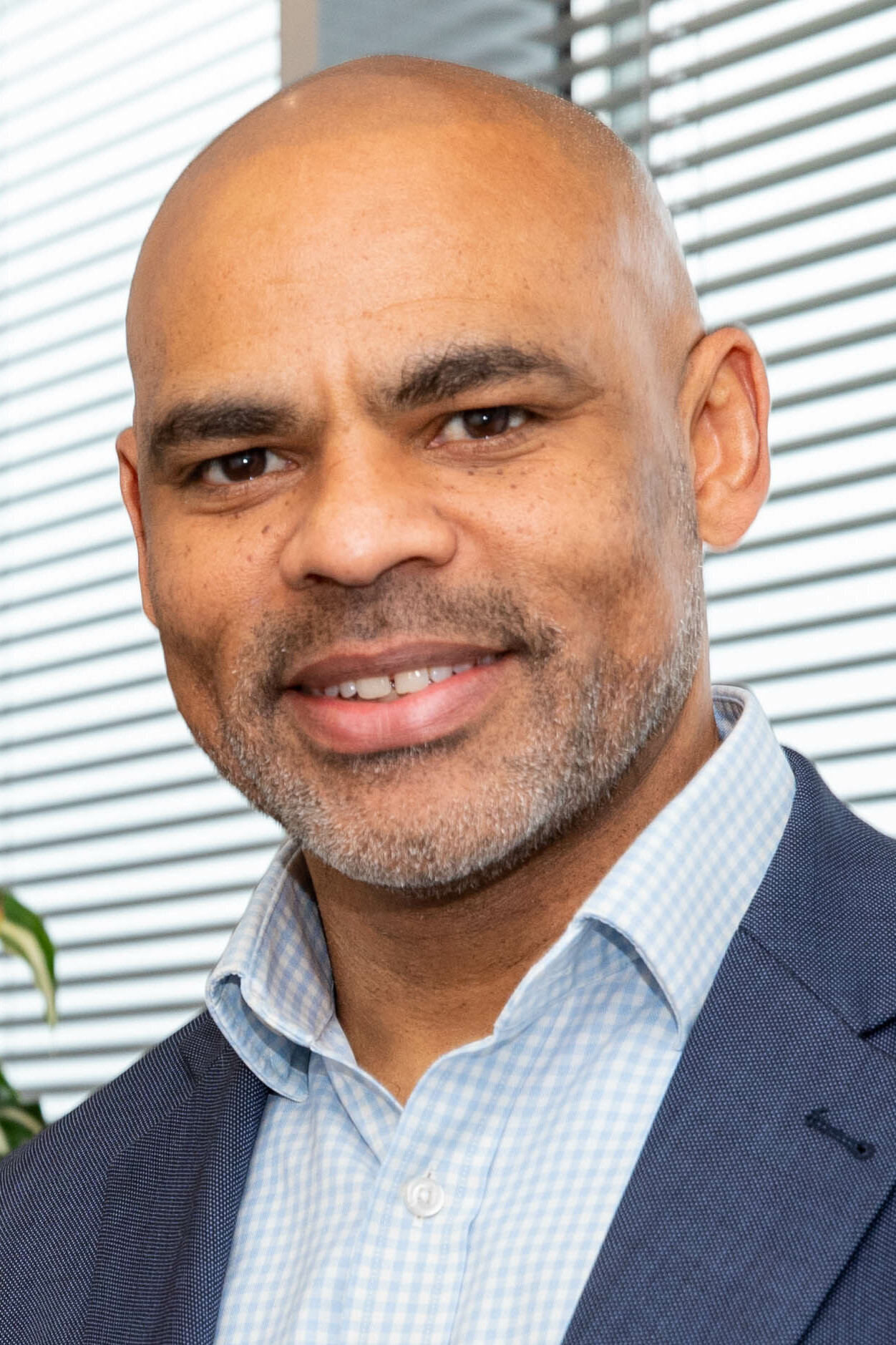
- Rees in 2023

2nd Mayor of Bristol
- In office 9 May 2016 – 7 May 2024
- Deputy: Craig Cheney; Asher Craig
- Preceded by: George Ferguson
- Succeeded by: Office abolished

Member of the House of Lords
- Lord Temporal
- Life peerage 4 February 2025

Personal details
- Born: Marvin Johnathan Rees; April 1972 (age 54) Bristol, England
- Party: Labour
- Spouse: Kiersten Rees
- Children: 3
- Education: Swansea University (BSc, MA); Eastern University (MS)
- Website: thebristolmayor.com

Marvin Johnathan Rees, Baron Rees of Easton OBE (born April 1972) is a British Labour Party politician who served as the second and final Mayor of Bristol from 2016 to 2024. He was created a life peer in February 2025.

== Early life and education ==
Marvin Rees was brought up in Bristol, partly in Lawrence Weston and Easton, by his British mother. He attended St George comprehensive school in Bristol and later obtained a master's degree in political theory and government at Swansea University, and a master's degree in global economic development at Eastern University in 2000. Later he completed the World Fellows Program at Yale University. During a fellowship he assisted Tony Campolo, an advisor to President Bill Clinton.

== Early career ==
Rees has worked in diverse areas throughout his career. He was a freelance journalist and radio presenter at BBC Radio Bristol and Ujima Radio. He was the Communications and Events Manager at Black Development Agency (now Phoenix Social Enterprise), an agency devoted to empowering individuals and communities through opportunities to work abroad.

Rees was employed in the city of Bristol as the programme manager for race equality in mental health issues at Public Health, Bristol. He worked in the United States as an outreach assistant at the Sojourners Community and as a youth coordinator at Tearfund.

== Political career ==
=== 2012 mayoral election ===
In 2012, selected by an individual ballot of Labour Party members in the city to stand for Mayor of Bristol, Rees defeated four other candidates for the nomination, including the Leader and Deputy Leader of the Bristol City Council Labour group and a former Member of Parliament, Dan Norris, who would later become Mayor of the West of England. At the election, he received 25,906 votes, coming second, after George Ferguson, an independent. Rees found it difficult readjusting to normal life following his election loss.

=== Community involvement ===
In 2012, Rees was the founder and programme leader at the Bristol Leadership Programme, a two-week programme helping a dozen people annually from impoverished backgrounds to attain their aspirations. He was also a member of the Bristol Legacy Commission which dispersed its funds and ceased operating in April 2012. He is a former director of the Bristol Partnership whose goals are to make Bristol's prosperity sustainable, reduce health and wealth inequality, build stronger and safer communities, and raise the aspirations and achievements of young people and families.

=== Mayor of Bristol ===
==== First term ====
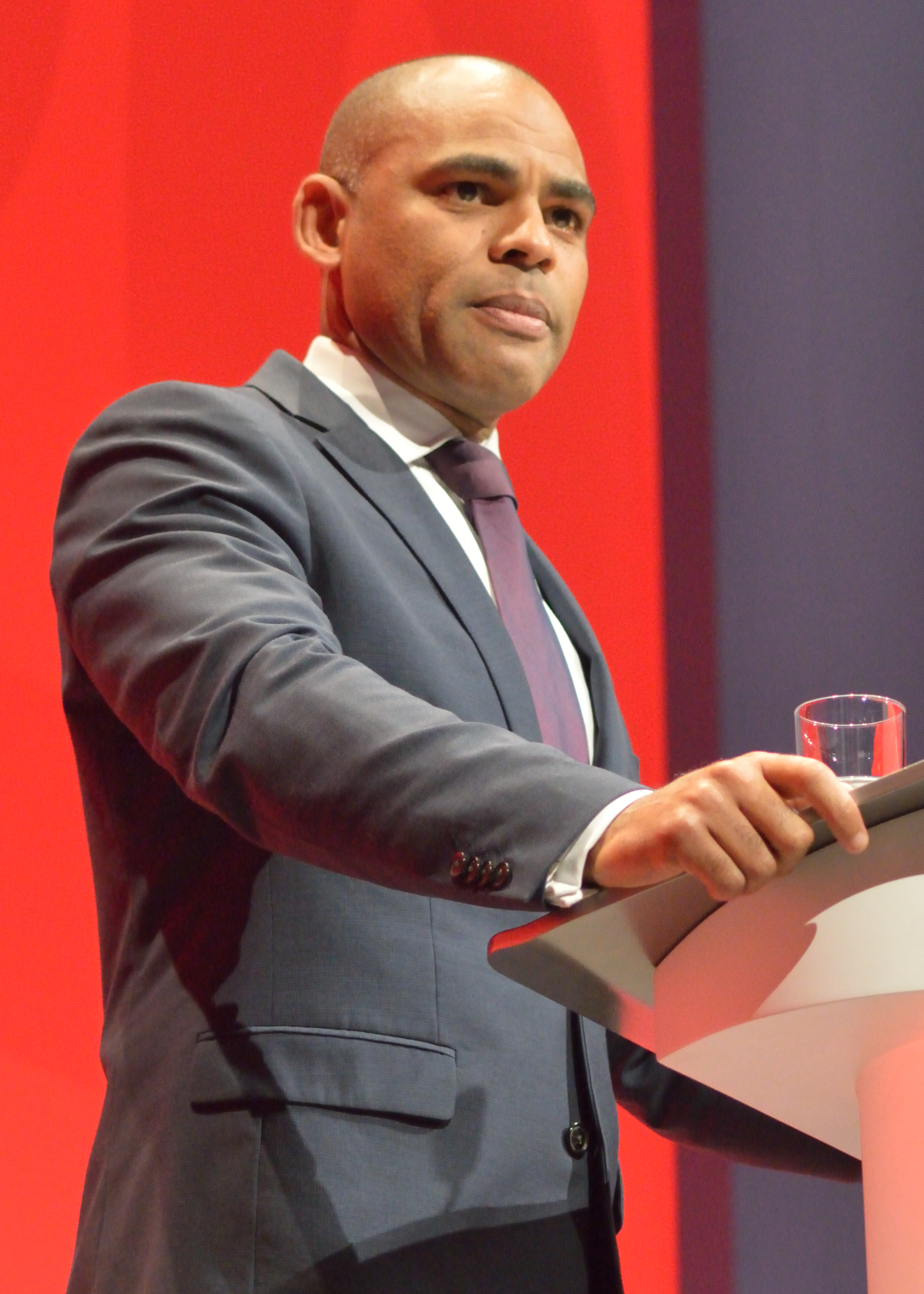
Rees speaking at the 2016 Labour Party conference

Rees was again selected to be the Labour candidate for the 2016 mayoral election, easily defeating a sitting Labour councillor in the selection. On 5 May 2016, he was elected Mayor of Bristol. He received 56,729 votes in the first round and 12,021 transfer votes in the second round, giving him 68,750 votes overall. He then became "the UK’s first directly elected black mayor", and "the first mayor of black African heritage elected in a major European city", so "Bristol became the first major European city to have elected a mayor of black African heritage".

Rees's term of office started with a £30 million budget shortfall inherited from the previous administration and a £60 million budget deficit from government funding reductions to 2020. In August 2016, Rees instigated a voluntary severance programme aimed at reducing the size of the council's workforce from 6,970 by 1,000. Rees commissioned an independent report by former Audit Commission chief executive Steve Bundred, which criticised senior council officers, leading Rees to say a culture of concealment had previously prevailed so councillors were unaware that agreed savings had not been fully delivered.

Rees had pledged to gradually increase home building in Bristol toward a 2020 target of 2,000 per year, of which 800 would be affordable. Rees oversaw the founding of a city-owned housing company, Goram Homes, created to develop and build homes, re-investing profits to the development of affordable and social housing. From 2016/17 to 2019/20 the outcome was between 1,350 and 1,994 new homes per year, of which between only 188 and 312 per year were affordable. The affordable homes target for 2020/21 was reduced to 500 due to the COVID-19 pandemic. Affordable homes had mostly been built on brownfield land. The council housing manager stated the missed target was delay rather than failure, with at least 1,028 affordable homes expected from current projects in 2022/23.

In the 2020 and 2021 Powerlists, Rees was listed in the Top 100 of the most influential people in the UK of African/African-Caribbean descent.

==== Bristol Arena ====
One matter that split public opinion was Rees's decision in September 2018 not to build the long-awaited 10,000 seat Bristol Arena near Temple Meads railway station, in the centre of Bristol. The episode brought discussion about the authority of a city mayor to make autonomous decisions in the face of opposition, after an overwhelming vote by councillors of all parties to keep it in the city centre. Concerns were raised at how businesses are able to influence those with decision-making and planning powers in cities.

The main reasons Rees gave for his decision were building cost, financial risk, and job creation. The building cost for the council, which would have had to be borrowed, had increased to £150 million from £91 million, plus half of any cost overruns. Costs arising should the arena not be successful would fall on the council, and expert advice was that the venue size was too small for major events. Rees also argued that a mixed use development would create more and better-paid jobs. The decision was also heavily influenced by an agreement to secure a 17,000-seat arena in the north of the city, built with private investment at no public cost.

==== Statue of Edward Colston ====
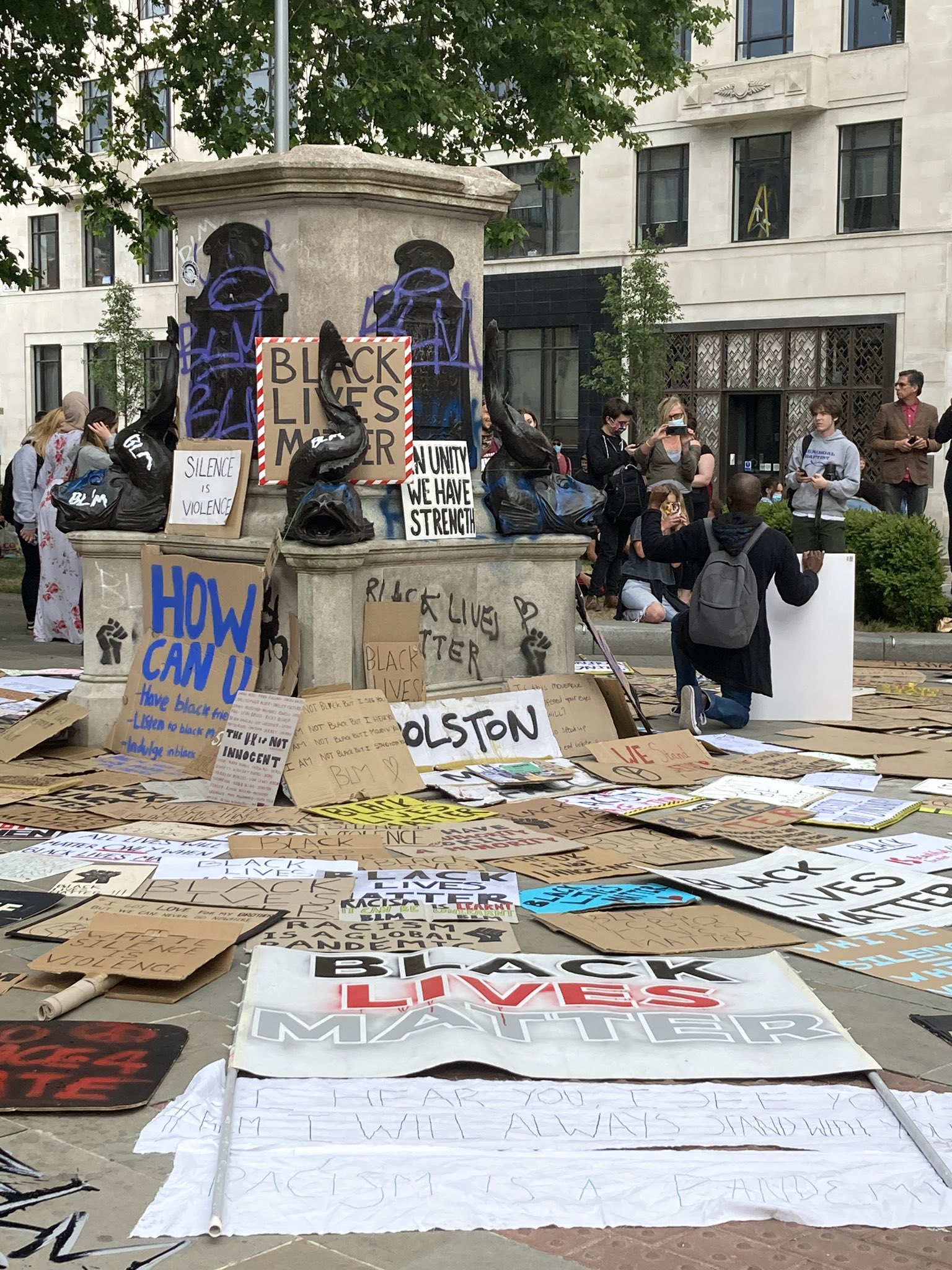
The empty pedestal of the statue of Edward Colston, showing placards and graffiti left after the statue's removal

In March 2019, Rees vetoed the installation of a second plaque to the statue of the Bristol-born merchant Edward Colston as he rejected the proposed wording as failing to adequately describe Colston's role in the Bristol slave trade.

In the aftermath in 2020 of the murder of George Floyd in Minneapolis, in police custody, protests were held around the world. In Bristol, protestors forcibly toppled the statue of Edward Colston and dropped it into the harbour. The statue was recovered from the harbour by Bristol City Council, and Rees announced it would end up in a Bristol museum, where the full history of the statue could be told. The events placed Bristol in the forefront of global news, including the major news channels in the UK and US. Rees announced a new commission on Bristol's history, so that there could be a wider understanding of the city's history, including struggles on class, race and gender. A fly-on-the-wall BBC documentary, called Statue Wars, was broadcast in June 2021, showing events in the Mayor's office as Rees managed the fall-out around the removal of the Colston statue.

On 9 December 2020, four people — often referred to as the "Colston 4" — were charged with causing criminal damage in relation to the toppling of the statue. In a trial at Bristol Crown Court, the defendants admitted they took part in the removal of the statue, but argued that it was justified. On 5 January 2022, the jury found the defendants not guilty of an offence.

After the trial, Rees received criticism for not acting sooner to remove the statue, thereby preventing the outbreak of anger. Rees argued he had made a choice to expend his political capital on employment, housing, education, and tackling racism rather than a contentious symbolic matter. He noted that action was being taken elsewhere, pointing to the name change of the Colston Hall which had already been committed to before the controversy surrounding Edward Colston gained nation-wide attention, so that the venue would no longer be associated with Colston's values and actions. Rees said he was pleased that the statue of Colston was no longer there.

==== Second term ====
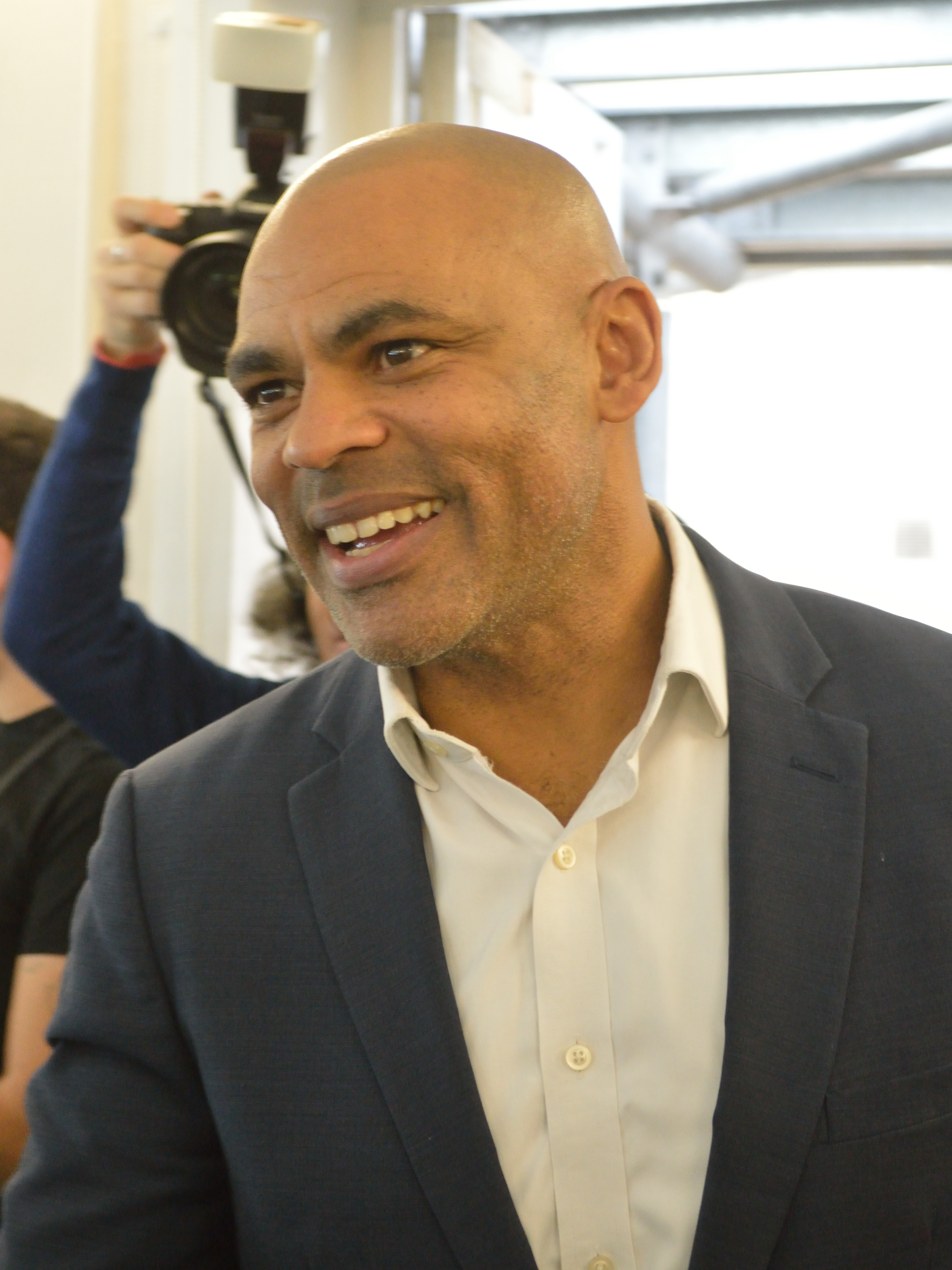
Rees in 2022

Rees's mayoral term was due to expire in May 2020, but the next election was delayed for 12 months due to the COVID-19 pandemic. The mayoral election took place in May 2021, and Rees was re-elected with 56.5% of the votes in a second round against the Green Party candidate, who won 43.5%. The Green Party made large gains in councillors, so Labour lost overall control of the council, with Labour and Greens both having 24 councillors. However, under the Mayoral model Rees was able to continue to exercise executive control of the council through a cabinet of exclusively Labour councillors.

Rees made a key election pledge to increase the new homes target for 2024 to 2,000 new homes per year, 1,000 of them affordable. In November 2021 Rees created the 'Project 1000' board to oversee the development of an affordable homes delivery plan.

In October 2020, Rees was awarded an honorary fellowship by the Royal Institute of British Architects for his work as a "city maker". In July 2023, he was presented with a Doctor of Letters from Swansea University.

In May 2022, a referendum took place in Bristol to decide if the city should continue being run by a mayor or a council-led committee system. The city voted 59% in favour of abolishing the post, on a 29% turnout. Rees continued to serve as mayor until May 2024, after which a new committee system was started.

In June 2022 Rees was criticised for taking a 9,200-mile (14,800 km) flight to Vancouver to speak about climate change at a TED event. After Rees was asked about the "irony" of this act, by a Local Democracy Reporting Service reporter, his council's head of external communications, Saskia Konynenburg, challenged the line taken and whether it was appropriate for a LDRS reporter, rather than "a journalist from a newspaper", to be asking the question. Shortly afterwards it was reported that LDRS staff would not be allowed to attend the mayor's future press conferences, resulting in a boycott of those events by several local news outlets, as well as the BBC and ITV.

On 6 July 2022, Rees announced that a Clean Air Zone for central Bristol would start on 28 November 2022. It would impose charges on more polluting older petrol and diesel vehicles, currently about a quarter of vehicles using the zone area.

In 2023 he sought selection as the Labour prospective parliamentary candidate for the new seat of Bristol North East at the 2024 general election. On 30 July, he was defeated by Mayor of Lewisham Damien Egan.

In July 2023 the Mayor's office put Rees forward for the World Mayor Prize. He was shortlisted in November the same year. His nomination was accompanied by commendations from local councillors and MPs but received a significant number of criticisms published on the dedicated web pages. Rees was not picked as winner in any category.

== Later career ==
In July 2023, Marvin Rees applied to become a parliamentary candidate for the Labour Party, but was not selected by Bristol Labour Party members. Rees was one of three people in the running to represent the new Bristol North East constituency alongside Lewisham Mayor Damien Egan and South Gloucestershire councillor Leigh Ingham . At the final hustings in Fishponds, around 700 party members voted on who they would like to stand for the seat at the next General Election, choosing Damien Egan. Egan went on to become the MP for Bristol North East.

In June 2024, Rees was appointed an honorary industrial professor at Bristol University, and will work at the university Cabot Institute for the Environment.

During an appearance on Newsnight in June 2024, Rees sparked controversy amid accusations he was ‘victim-shaming’ Nigel Farage by saying the Reform UK leader had helped create the kind of anger that saw someone throw a stone at him on an open top bus.

On 4 September 2024, Rees launched his memoir, Let's See What Happens (ISBN 978-1035009169), about his life and time as Mayor.

=== Deleted emails controversy ===
In December 2024, it emerged that a Freedom of Information request by a local democracy activist to uncover details of Rees's meetings could not be satisfied because Rees's email inbox 'had been deleted' just a month after he left office. Conservative and Green Bristol City Councillors rejected the argument that the emails were permanently expunged at that point. During the meeting, they described the rejection of the FOI as a "stain on [Bristol's] civic character", and "in breach of the council's statutory duty", calling Bristol City Council an "impenetrable fortress" for members of the public seeking information about decision-making. Following the controversy, Bristol City Councillors voted unanimously to implement a raft of suggested reforms to give greater accessibility and transparency of public records.

Marvin Rees had previously described himself as "Bristol's most transparent person".

=== Peerage ===
In December 2024 Rees was nominated for a life peerage to become a Labour member of the House of Lords as part of the 2024 Political Peerages. He was created Baron Rees of Easton, of Saint Pauls in the City of Bristol on 4 February 2025. He made his maiden speech in the House of Lords on 3 April 2025, during a debate on net-zero emissions.

== Personal life ==
Marvin Rees describes himself as the mixed-race son of a British-Jamaican father and white British mother, with his mother raising him as a single parent. He was born and grew up in Bristol in financially difficult circumstances with seven siblings. According to Rees, his paternal four-times-great-grandfather was executed by the colonial Jamaican government for participating in the 1865 Morant Bay rebellion. He is married to Kiersten Rees, with whom he has three children. He lived in Easton from 1978 until 2016, moving shortly after he became mayor.

In 2018 a documentary film was released with a premiere at Watershed, Bristol, about Rees's journey into politics and his two campaigns for the city's top political job. The Mayor's Race was filmed between 2011 and 2017, covering Rees's two mayoral campaigns in 2012 and 2016 as well as Bristol's historical issues of race and racism—including the 1963 bus boycott, the 1980 St Pauls riot, and the Bristol slave trade. In 2020 the BBC made a documentary around Rees and the events surrounding the felling of the Colston statue entitled "Statue Wars". The documentary was made by Uplands TV and had full behind the scenes access to Mayor Rees and his senior team.

Rees is a Christian, attending Hope Community Church in Hotwells and has spoken openly about his faith. For the first years of his career he worked for a Christian anti-poverty charity and a Christian social justice magazine.

Rees was appointed Officer of the Order of the British Empire (OBE) in the 2024 New Year Honours for services to local government.
