= Russia Report =

Russia Report can mean:

- In the United States, the 2019 Mueller Report
- In the United Kingdom, the 2020 Intelligence and Security Committee Russia report
