= Tara Kelton =

Contemporary artist who works primarily in digital media and installation

- Born: 1981; Arlington, Texas
- Website: https://tarakelton.com/

Tara Kelton (born 1981) is a contemporary artist who works primarily in digital media and installation art to explore the social and political impacts of the digital in contemporary life.

== Early life and education ==
Kelton received a bachelor's degree (BFA) from Parsons: the New School for Design and a master's degree (MFA) from the Yale School of Art.

== Career ==
Many of Kelton's works focus on the interaction between multinational internet corporations and India. Her 2014 series Guided Tours focused on the experience of being captured on camera for Google Street View, as it relates to heritage sites in India; the artwork reverses the typical link and projects these sites onto viewers. Her 2018 work Black Box concerned the fantasies of Uber drivers in Bangalore.The River by DisneyHuntress (2019) appropriates video from the virtual reality platform Sansar, embedding it to a local landscape.

Kelton also works in oil painting, often of digitally-sourced subjects, or as a part of a larger installation. Her 2014 Untitled (Title Unknown) reproduces in oil paint a gallery opening in New York City that Kelton found via Google Street View. Kelton has said this work was inspired by the fact that “Google’s algorithms automatically blur out any faces they ‘see’,” something Kelton reproduces in her paintings.

Brittany in the Pool (2020), an installation that includes an oil painting of a selfie, is about Brittany Kaiser, one of the whistleblowers in the Cambridge Analytica data scandal.

With Marialaura Ghidini, Kelton publishes Silicon Plateau, an art project that concerns the role of the digital world in Bangalore.

== Work ==
=== Solo exhibitions (selected) ===
- 2020: Tara Kelton, Mumbai Art Room, Mumbai, India

=== Group exhibitions (selected) ===
- 2015: Seeing the Elephant at MassArt Art Museum (MAAM), Boston, Massachusetts
- 2016: Art Basel, Miami Beach: Kelton's piece was titled Flying Carpet (mixed media: Roomba (robot vacuum), tablet computer, looped video; 2014)
