= Arron Banks =

British businessman (born 1966)

- Born: Arron Fraser Andrew Banks; 1966 (age 59–60); Cheshire, England
- Education: St Bartholomew's School; The Castle School
- Occupation: Businessman
- Political party: Reform UK
- Other political affiliations: UKIP (until 2017)
- Spouses: Caroline (m. 1987; div. 1998); Ekaterina Paderina (m. 2001)
- Children: 5

External image
- Image by huffingtonpost.co.uk

Arron Fraser Andrew Banks (born 1966) is a British businessman and political donor. He was the co-founder (with Richard Tice) of the Leave.EU campaign and one of the largest donors to the UK Independence Party (UKIP), helping Nigel Farage's campaign for Brexit.

In November 2018 the National Crime Agency opened an investigation into Banks following concerns raised over the source of his funding. In September 2019, the NCA dropped its investigation into Banks and Leave.EU, finding "no evidence that any criminal offences have been committed."

Banks was reported to have had multiple meetings with Russian embassy officials as well as being offered business opportunities in Russia in the run-up to the Brexit referendum. He denied any wrongdoing and said: "There was no Russian money and no interference of any type." In May 2020, the Electoral Commission, who had referred Banks to the NCA for investigation of these allegations, conceded Banks did not break electoral law during the 2016 EU referendum campaign. Banks said he had been "completely vindicated" after reaching a settlement with the Electoral Commission.

In the 2025 West of England mayoral election, Banks was Reform UK's candidate to become the directly-elected mayor of the West of England Combined Authority, losing narrowly to the winning Labour candidate, Helen Godwin.

== Early life ==
Banks was born in Cheshire, England, and raised by his mother in Basingstoke, Hampshire; his father worked as a sugar plantation manager in various African countries. From the age of 13 he attended a boarding school in Berkshire called Crookham Court, before being expelled for "an accumulation of offences", including the sale of lead stolen from the roofs of school buildings, and "high-spirited bad behaviour". He then attended St Bartholomew's School in Newbury but was expelled again. He returned to Basingstoke, where he sold paintings, vacuum cleaners, and then houses.

== Business career ==
Banks was offered a junior job at the insurance market of Lloyd's of London. According to The Guardian, by the age of 27, he was running a division of Norwich Union. The article also claims that he spent a year working for Berkshire Hathaway, the investment company of Warren Buffett. However, in another investigation in 2017, both Norwich Union and Warren Buffett reject Banks' claim that he worked for them. Then, from an office above a bakery in Thornbury, Gloucestershire, Banks started a motorcycle insurance broker, Motorcycle Direct, and within a few years the company was big enough to sell for "a few million". He used the money to found Commercial Vehicle Direct about which he says "within a very short period we were the largest van insurance company in the country".

Over seven years, along with Australian business partner John Gannon, Banks expanded the van insurance business to become Group Direct Limited, and in 2008 the company floated by means of a reverse takeover as Brightside Group. He was its CEO from June 2011 to June 2012, at which time the company was listed on the Alternative Investment Market (AIM). After Banks was dismissed from the company in 2012, he sold £6m worth of the shares in 2013, and received significantly more when the investment firm AnaCap Financial Partners bought Brightside the following year.

Banks was the chief executive (CEO) of Southern Rock Insurance Company in 2014, which underwrites insurance policies for the website GoSkippy.com, founded by Banks. After Banks' departure, Brightside took legal action against him, alleging he used confidential information in setting up GoSkippy.com six months later. There were also legal actions between Southern Rock and Brightside.

Banks was CEO of AIM-listed Manx Financial Group from April 2008 to February 2009. The Guardian reported in 2014 that Companies House records appeared to show that Banks had set up 37 different companies using slight variations of his name. The names used by Banks were Aron Fraser Andrew Banks, Arron Andrew Fraser Banks, Arron Fraser Andrew Banks and Arron Banks. The profiles for the first three names all used the same date of birth but registered different lists of companies. When asked by The Guardian about this in 2014, he declined to answer questions on the topic.

Banks also owns Eldon Insurance, whose CEO Elizabeth Bilney was also in charge at Leave.EU. The company's profits leapt to £16.7m for the first half of 2017 after recording a £284,000 profit in 2015 and a loss of £22,500 in 2016 despite a 40% increase in revenue. Banks said that Eldon's business had been transformed by the same AI technology used in the Brexit campaign. The offshore holding company that controls Eldon Insurance is ICS Risk Solutions, which funds many of Banks' activities and has paid over £77m between 2015 and 2018 to prop up Southern Rock after Gibraltarian regulators found the business to be trading while technically insolvent. As part of an agreement with the regulators Banks resigned his directorships at Eldon in 2013 and Southern Rock in 2014, also accepting a "period of ban or self-exclusion from other insurance directorships".

Banks also bought Old Down Manor from musician Mike Oldfield, converting it into a wedding venue.

In 2016, the leaked Panama Papers indicated Banks along with Elizabeth Bilney were shareholders of British Virgin Islands company PRI Holdings Limited, which was the sole shareholder of African Strategic Resources Limited. However, a spokesperson for Banks has denied any links to the lawyer named and denies that Banks was involved with the Papers. Banks has stated that he has a controlling interest in a diamond mine in Kimberley, South Africa, and a licence to mine in Lesotho. In July 2018, Banks denied that money paid to a government minister in Lesotho was a bribe; it had been paid to guarantee diamond mining rights in Lesotho. In 2013, Banks paid £65,000 into the private bank account of Thesele Maseribane, then the Basotho minister for women's equality. Banks subsequently covered the £350,000 costs of a political campaign for Maseribane, in 2014, following a military coup in Lesotho.

In January 2015, one estimate of Banks's wealth was £100 million. In November 2017, an estimate of £250 million was mentioned.

=== Other business associations ===
Following intensified media scrutiny after his initial donation to UKIP, it emerged that Banks was involved in mining in southern Africa and had connections to Belize. Banks also has connections to companies based in Gibraltar and the Isle of Man, and close connections with family members of the Belizean Prime Minister. However, following remarks made by The Thick of It creator Armando Iannucci on BBC One's Question Time programme, Banks denied owning a company in Belize or seeking to avoid UK tax "via any device". Describing the comments as "clearly defamatory", he threatened legal action towards Iannucci if he did not get an apology within a week.

Asked if his companies paid full corporation tax, Banks said: "I paid over £2.5m of income tax last year ... My insurance business, like a lot of them, is based in Gibraltar but I've got UK businesses as well that deal with customers and pay tax like everyone else." One of the UK businesses of which Banks is director, Rock Services Ltd, the name of which refers to The Rock of Gibraltar, had a turnover of £19.7m in 2013 and paid corporation tax of as little as £12,000. The company deducted £19.6m in "administrative expenses", and the main activity appears to be "recharge of goods and services" with Southern Rock Insurance Company. Southern Rock Insurance states on its website that it underwrites policies for the customers of GoSkippy.com, which is run by Banks.

Rock Services and Southern Rock Insurance's ultimate holding company is Rock Holdings Ltd, a company based on the Isle of Man. Banks has also been a "substantial" shareholder in STM Fidecs, of which Leave.EU is a subsidiary; the company claims to be specialising in "international wealth protection", maximising tax efficiencies for entrepreneurs and expatriates and of "structuring international groups, particularly separating and relocating intellectual property and treasury functions to low- or no-tax jurisdictions".

== Political career and donations ==
=== UK Independence Party ===
Formerly a Conservative Party donor, in October 2014 Banks donated £100,000 to the UK Independence Party. In response to comments from William Hague that Banks had not been a major Conservative donor in past years, and that he had never heard of Banks, Banks increased his UKIP donation to £1 million, directly referencing Hague's interview as his reasoning. Banks said that he had changed party allegiance because he agreed with UKIP's policies and its view that the European Union "is holding the UK back" because it's a "closed shop for bankrupt countries".

Banks signalled his intention to stand for UKIP in the constituency of Thornbury and Yate at the 2015 general election, but the candidate chosen by the party was Russ Martin, who came third.

In September 2016, following Banks's statement that UKIP would be "dead in the water" if Diane James did not become leader, he said that he would leave UKIP if Steven Woolfe was prevented from running for leader and two other senior members, Neil Hamilton and Douglas Carswell, remained in the party.

Banks was sceptical of Paul Nuttall's leadership of UKIP (from November 2016 until June 2017), saying in December 2016 that he might stop supporting the party.

In February 2017, Banks suggested that he might stand in Clacton at the next general election against Carswell, UKIP's only MP. He said in March 2017 that he had been suspended from UKIP, believing the reason was that he had criticised the leadership. UKIP said that his membership had lapsed before this time. In April 2017, he said he would not be contesting the Clacton seat.

In May 2018, Banks joined former UKIP leader Nigel Farage in attending a fundraising event for the Democratic Unionist Party, and stated that he would support a bid by Farage to seek office as a DUP candidate after the end of his tenure as a Member of the European Parliament in 2019.

=== Conservative Party ===
In October 2014, a spokesman for Nigel Farage said that Banks had funded the Chipping Sodbury office for the South Gloucestershire Conservatives "to the tune of £250,000". However, a Conservative spokesperson said the support was "nothing like the order of magnitude" of sums claimed, and estimated that the donations were "probably around the £22,000 mark".

A UKIP source told The Guardian that Banks had also loaned £75,417 to the Thornbury and Yate Conservative Party through Panacea Finance (his former company) in September 2007, registered on the Electoral Commission and to be paid back by 2022. However, Companies House records show that Banks resigned from the company in September 2005; therefore it was considered questionable as to whether Banks was controlling the company at the time, or whether he was "using the firm as a 'proxy donor'", according to The Guardian.

In August 2018, it was reported that Banks had applied to join the Conservative Party and had suggested that Leave.EU supporters do the same, with the aim of voting in the party's next leadership election. According to the report, Andy Wigmore, Leave.EU's communications director, who had also applied to join the party, announced that they had received an email welcoming them, but the Conservative Party stated that their applications had not been approved. A Conservative Party spokesman said that welcoming emails were automatic but applications were subsequently reviewed, and theirs had been rejected.

=== Reform UK candidate ===
In the 2025 West of England mayoral election, which took place on 1 May 2025, Banks was Reform UK's candidate to become the directly-elected mayor of the West of England Combined Authority. He came second, gaining 22 per cent of the votes, while the winning Labour candidate, Helen Godwin, had 25 per cent. Banks won more votes than any other candidate in South Gloucestershire.

Banks told the Financial Times in September 2025 that Reform UK should roll back human rights laws and get rid of legislation underpinning corporate regulation, saying in regards to regulators that he wants to "get rid of virtually everything".

== Campaign for Brexit ==
The Independent described Banks as the "leading figure" behind the anti-EU Grassroots Out and Leave.EU campaigns. He funded Leave.EU to the equivalent of $5 million, and has been seen as the financial backer of the Brexit campaign.

In October 2014, Banks said that the UK's EU membership was "like having a first class ticket on the Titanic". He also said that "economically, remaining in the EU is unsustainable." In September 2015, Banks threatened UKIP MP Douglas Carswell with deselection when it emerged that Carswell supported Vote Leave, as opposed to the Leave.EU campaign funded by Banks. According to The Huffington Post, he described Carswell as "borderline autistic with mental illness wrapped in".

In April 2016, Private Eye reported that Leave.EU "is registered at Companies House as Better for the Country Ltd. and controlled by major UKIP donor Arron Banks, after Gibraltar company STM Fidecs Nominees Ltd. transferred its interest to him in August." Banks, along with property investor Richard Tice and media guru Andrew Wigmore, donated £4.3m to the group.

Banks threatened to sue the official Vote Leave campaign's candidacy as the official spokesperson for the "Leave" vote in the 2016 EU referendum, which may have possibly delayed the vote by two months. However, Banks has since rejected this and stated that he would not pursue a judicial review any further.

Banks said in May 2016 that his strategy during the Brexit campaign was to "bore the electorate into submission", in the hope that a low turnout would favour Brexit.

Following the murder of Labour MP Jo Cox on 16 June 2016, Banks commissioned a poll on whether it had affected public opinion on voting. Asked whether the wording of the poll was "tasteless", Banks said "I don't think so", adding that: "We were hoping to see what the effect of the event was. That is an interesting point of view, whether it would shift public opinion."

=== Post-referendum events ===
Banks credited the success of Leave.EU to their hiring of Goddard Gunster and their subsequent adoption of "an American-style media approach." Days after the UK voted for Brexit, Banks said that Leave.EU would continue campaigning as a "rightwing Momentum", ensuring that politicians do not renege on their commitment to leave the EU. He also considered starting and funding a pro-Brexit, nonpartisan citizens' movement called Patriotic Alliance, based on the Italian Five Star Movement, which would target "the 200 worst, most corrupt MPs" for deselection.

Following the UK's vote to leave the EU, Banks emailed a note to journalists attacking his critics. Banks described the parliamentary Electoral Commission as "the legal division of the In campaign" and disagreed with their decision to enlist Vote Leave as the official campaign. Banks' response to the information commissioner, who in 2016 fined the campaign £50,000 for sending more than half a million unsolicited text messages, was a succinct "Whatever". In 2017, Banks viewed the Brexit vote as "a kind of halfhearted revolution" due to the fact that Theresa May, who supported Britain remaining in the EU, would end up betraying those who voted to leave.

In November 2017, the Electoral Commission announced that it was investigating whether election rules were broken during the EU referendum, in donations worth a total of £8.4 million to Leave.EU campaigners made by Banks and by Better for the Country Ltd, a company of which Banks is a registered director.

There were questions as to the source of funds Banks used to support Brexit, and in November 2018 this was referred for criminal investigation. Banks denied any wrongdoing and stated that he welcomed the police investigation to put an end to the allegations.

The National Crime Agency investigated Leave.EU, Banks and Bilney, as well as other individuals and entities, following the referral of material from a second Electoral Commission investigation. The referral was announced amid concerns that Banks was not the true source of £8m donated to Leave.EU. In September 2019 the National Crime Agency said it had found no evidence of criminality after investigating a series of claims against the Brexit campaign group Leave.EU and Arron Banks. The NCA said: "It will therefore take no further action against Mr Banks, Ms Bilney, Better for the Country Ltd or Leave.EU in respect of this specific matter."

Banks said that Barclays closed his bank accounts in 2018, including business accounts, due to his political views.

In April 2019, a Channel 4 investigation also appeared to point to the conclusion that Banks's Leave.EU organisation faked migrant footage and photographs of "migrants" assaulting women. The photos were never used, but the fake video went viral. Banks accused Channel 4 News journalists of creating "fake news" themselves.

=== Leave.EU Liquidation ===
As of April 2022, the Brexit campaign group Leave.EU has gone into liquidation with co-founder Arron Banks appearing to write off a loan worth more than £7m.

== Links to Russian officials and Donald Trump campaign ==
From September 2015, Banks, along with Andy Wigmore, had multiple meetings with Russian officials posted at the Russian embassy in London. In November 2015, Alexander Yakovenko, the Russian ambassador, introduced Banks to a Russian businessman, which was followed by other business proposals on the part of Russians. Banks was offered a chance to invest in Russian-owned gold or diamond mines; the deal involved funding from a Russian state-owned bank, and was announced 12 days after the Brexit referendum. It is not clear if Banks invested.

For two years, Banks said his only contacts with the Russian government consisted of one "boozy lunch" with the ambassador. After The Observer reported that he had had multiple meetings at which he had been offered lucrative business deals, Banks told a parliamentary inquiry into fake news he had had "two or three" meetings. In July 2018 when pressed by The New York Times, he said there had been a fourth meeting. The Observer has seen evidence that suggests his Leave.EU campaign team met with Russian embassy officials as many as 11 times in the run-up to the EU referendum and in the two months beyond.

It was reported that on 12 November 2016, Banks had a meeting with president-elect Donald Trump in Trump Tower and that upon return to London, Banks had lunch with the Russian ambassador where they discussed the Trump visit.

In a defamation claim against the journalist Carole Cadwalladr, Banks was awarded £35,000 in damages and 60% of his costs. Banks said he was defamed after comments Cadwalladr made about his relationship with the Russian state. Banks initially lost his case in the High Court but succeeded in the Court of Appeal. The Appeal Judges ruled he was due damages for a TED Talk given by Cadwalladr. While covered by a public interest defence when it was originally given, that defence fell away on 29 April 2020 when the Electoral Commission issued a statement that Banks did not commit any criminal offence. The Court of Appeal found views of the TED Talk after this date caused Banks serious harm, hence the damages. All other points of the appeal by Banks were dismissed. In 2023, following Banks' partial success in an appeal, Cadwalladr was ordered to pay about £1.2 million in legal costs; she set up a crowdfunding site to help pay these costs.

This legal action carried out by Banks was considered by 19 press freedom organisations to be a strategic lawsuit against public participation (SLAPP) and abuse of law.

== Greta Thunberg ==
In August 2019 Banks was criticised by Labour MPs Tonia Antoniazzi and David Lammy after a tweet about the climate change activist Greta Thunberg as she set off on a two-week voyage in a zero carbon yacht. Banks tweeted: "Freak yachting accidents do happen in August". Tanja Bueltmann, founder of the EU Citizens' Champion campaign, also strongly criticised the tweet. Banks responded that he produced the tweet because he enjoys watching outrage, later stating: "Obviously I don't hope she encounters a freak yachting accident. I just enjoy watching the ludicrous tweeter mob following the next outrage."

== Websites ==
=== LibLabCon.com ===
Banks gave significant funds to LibLabCon.com, a satirical website dedicated to attacking the three major parties. The website included jokes about the treatment of religious people by the Conservatives, claimed Chuka Umunna is "Labour's chief spokesman for tokenism" and described Amnesty International as an organisation which supports "loudmouth idiots chained to a radiator".

=== Westmonster ===
On 19 January 2017 (one day before Donald Trump's inauguration as the 45th President of the United States) Banks launched Westmonster alongside Michael Heaver, former press adviser to Nigel Farage. It is modelled on the right-wing US websites Breitbart News and the Drudge Report and claims to be "pro-Brexit, pro-Farage, pro-Trump, anti-establishment, anti-open borders, anti-corporatism". In the morning of 19 January, Westmonster's Twitter account had gained more than 2,500 followers.

==== Owners ====
The official registered owners of the site are Heaver, who owns 50% of the website and is a daily editor, and Better for the Country Ltd. Better for the Country Ltd is the company that ran Leave.EU (one of two main pro-Brexit campaigns, affiliated to Farage) and is directed by Leave.EU's chief executive, Elizabeth Bilney. Better for the Country Ltd is also registered to the same address as Westmonster.

==== Early contributors and style ====
Westmonster's welcome message stated that the political establishment had "taken one hell of a beating" in 2016, adding that "2017 might just be even bigger". The timing of this launch was seen as sign that the anti-establishment media which helped Trump to gain power was arriving in the UK, according to BBC News' media editor Amol Rajan.

Although primarily a news aggregator website akin to the Drudge Report, Westmonster does plan to publish original content and enlist the support of celebrities and backbench MPs. Early contributions to the website included a piece written by Nigel Farage stating that the "political establishment" of the United Kingdom had not woken up to European populist movements, as well as articles showing majority British support for a burka ban and criticising "remoaners" for "trying to subvert the will of the people".

== Personal life ==
At age 21, Banks married his first wife, Caroline, with whom he has two daughters. The marriage lasted ten years.

In 2001, Banks married Russian Ekaterina Paderina, with whom he has two sons and a daughter. Paderina previously overstayed her visa but married merchant seaman Eric Butler. The three-month marriage was investigated by officials due to suspicions it was a sham. She is reported to have received help to remain in the UK from Mike Hancock while he was a Liberal Democrat MP.

In 2014, Banks reportedly lived in the village of Tockington near Bristol in a house with a "huge" Union Flag flying over the front lawn, and owned another house overlooking a game reserve near Pretoria in South Africa.

Banks's 2016 book, The Bad Boys of Brexit: Tales of Mischief, Mayhem & Guerrilla Warfare in the EU Referendum Campaign, was ghostwritten by pro-Brexit journalist Isabel Oakeshott.

In 2020, Banks spent six months in Auckland, New Zealand after the country went into lockdown following the coronavirus pandemic. He has voiced his support for the leader of the New Zealand First Party, Winston Peters.

== In popular culture ==
Banks was portrayed by actor Lee Boardman in the 2019 HBO and Channel 4 produced drama entitled Brexit: The Uncivil War.
