= Eldon Insurance =

Eldon Insurance Services
- Industry: Insurance company
- Founded: Newcastle upon Tyne, England, United Kingdom (2007; 19 years ago)
- Headquarters: Bristol, United Kingdom
- Key people: Arron Banks
- Number of employees: 361 (2017)
- Parent: ICS Risk Solutions
- Website: eldoninsurance.co.uk

Eldon Insurance Services Limited or simply Eldon Insurance is a British insurance broking and claims management company controlled by Arron Banks. It is based in Bristol but also has offices in Newcastle, Southampton, and South Africa. Founded in 2007 the company is regulated by the Financial Conduct Authority (FCA). It specialises in motor vehicle insurance and currently operates under the trade names GoSkippy, Footprint, Plato Insurance Services, and Vavista. Also previously Solid Insurance (2013), Business Choice Direct (2014–16) and others.

It is closely related to Gibraltar-based Southern Rock Insurance which is the main underwriter for Eldon and also controlled by Banks.

== History ==
The company was incorporated in August 2007 with John Gannon and Paul Chase-Gardener as founding directors. Michael Lee became a director shortly after and was the managing director in 2009, when said that the company had a staff of 160 and customer base of 250,000. Eldon's parent company was then the Gibraltar-based Southern Rock Holdings, which also owns Southern Rock Insurance. In 2010 the company website identified it as a Newcastle-based provider of motor claims management services on behalf of Southern Rock Insurance. Lee, who co-founded Southern Rock Holdings and had also served as managing director of Southern Rock Insurance, resigned his directorship in April 2011 to move to Hastings Direct.

At the time, the trio of Banks, Chase-Gardener and Gannon were also the three executive directors of Bristol-based Brightside Group and owned 72% of Southern Rock Insurance, growing the group out of Commercial Vehicle Direct which they co-founded in 2001. The launch of the GoSkippy brand six months after Banks' departure as chief executive at Brightside in 2012 preceded a bitter dispute including legal action between Brightside, Southern Rock and Eldon. Gannon left at the end of August 2012, and by the end of the year the company began leasing office space on the Cribbs Causeway development in Bristol to house the GoSkippy operation and Banks subsequently hired a number of Brightside's staff. Banks became a director upon the departure of Gannon, and Chase-Gardener also departed in February 2013. As Banks and Gannon sold Brightside shares, Chase-Gardener swapped all his shares in Rock Holdings to increase his Brightside interest, also resigning from the group's other companies. On 26 February 2013 ownership of Eldon transferred to another group 70% owned by Banks, and received authorisation as a UK insurance broker at the start of April. According to Eldon's publicly filed accounts, the transfer of ownership was achieved by first issuing almost £2.2m of new shares to the company's ultimate parent, Rock Holdings in a debt for equity deal in February. Those shares and the original 100 were then purchased by the newly created, Isle of Man-based, ICS Risk Solutions in July for £7.5m. This did not affect control of Eldon as Arron Banks was then majority shareholder in both parent companies.

Banks was forced to resign from Eldon in September 2013 and Southern Rock Insurance the following year, as part of an agreement with Gibraltarian regulators also accepting a "period of ban or self-exclusion from other insurance directorships" after they found Southern Rock to be trading while technically insolvent. Banks was replaced as a director by his Hong Kong-based brother Johnathan. Just before Christmas 2013, the company's auditors, Baker Tilly LLP resigned, reporting that the relationship had broken-down because "by failing to supply accurate information, management is imposing a limitation of scope on our work." Banks has pointed to a conflict of interest. By early 2014 Eldon had launched the Footprint brand to sell van and motorbike policies and Business Choice Direct for commercial insurance. At the end of the year it began a partnership to sell insurance under the Debenhams brand.

Eldon's new holding company ICS Risk Solutions, in 2015 also paid Southern Rock Insurance (which continues to be the main underwriter for Eldon) approximately £77m for rights to some of its future income, enabling it meet its obligation under solvency regulations. Brightside and Southern Rock reached an undisclosed out of court settlement in May 2015 bringing to a close their disputes relating to intellectual property, breaches of trading agreements and breaches of terms of business agreements. The following month Eldon sent call centre workers home while it trailed moving their work to South Africa, stating that it was "entering into a period of consultation with up to 200 members of staff across the business". Subsequently, 174 employees were made redundant at the Newcastle and Bristol offices.

Eldon is also 50% owner of a joint venture called Vavista, which began trading in 2015 and provides "health and wellbeing programmes" with its insurance policies. It also has a 49% shareholding in Legal Protection Group, launched in 2016, which sells legal protection insurance, legal services and emergency assistance products. In October 2016 another new company, Somerset Bridge was created to act as managing general agent in order to diversify the panel of insurers Eldon has access to. In November the Business Choice Direct brand was moved to a newly created subsidiary company of which Eldon owns 51%. According to the company website they also moved into new offices in Eastleigh.

During 2017 Eldon moved its offices in Newcastle into larger premises. Late in the year, it was reported that Banks intends to float the company on the public stock market in 2018. However the professor of finance at Manchester Business School called Banks' reported £250m valuation "highly ambitious".

=== Leave.EU ===
Elizabeth (Liz) Bilney, who became a director shortly before Paul Chase-Gardener resigned, was reported to be the CEO in 2017 and was also in charge at Leave.EU during the Brexit campaign. Andy Wigmore was also a director at the time (December 2015 until April 2018). The company's Bristol headquarters was also the HQ for Leave.EU. Brittany Kaiser, a former director of Cambridge Analytica, has said that when she visited Leave.EU HQ in late 2015 she saw Eldon employees staffing a call centre for the campaign. She added that she thought the staff, most who had never participated in politics before, were calling leads or current customers of Eldon.

In August 2016 the Leave.EU campaign announced a sponsorship deal with the Goskippy brand and offering a 10% discount on insurance. From June 2017 the GoSkippy brand began appearing alongside that of Leave.EU on the campaign's Facebook and Twitter posts, including one featuring a photo of the burning Grenfell Tower stating "An amnesty for Grenfell illegal immigrants? Absolutely not! The law is the law."

The Guardian reported in April 2018 that the UK Information Commissioner's Office was investigating whether Eldon shared data with the Leave.EU campaign. Although Banks had previously admitted advertising insurance products to campaign supporters, he stated "Eldon has never given or used any data to Leave.EU. They are separate entities with strong data control rules. And vice versa."

In November 2018 the Information Commissioner took enforcement action against Eldon Insurance and Leave.EU for breaches of the Data Protection Act, fining them a total of £135,000.

The company changed its legal name to Somerset Bridge Insurance Services on 6 December 2019.

== Finances ==
During 2013 Eldon sold 113,000 policies and recorded a £239,000 pre-tax profit on a revenue of £12.8m including income of £9m from services sold to Southern Rock Insurance, but paying £11.4m to Rock Services, another UK company that Banks holds a directorship with. By 2015 Eldon achieved a £284,000 profit on a revenue of £33.7m with income of £27.7m from Southern Rock and paying £27.5m to Rock Services. Rock Holdings Ltd, another holding company based on the Isle of Man, is the parent of both Rock Services and Southern Rock Holdings. Rock Services' main activity seems to be "recharge of goods and services" with Southern Rock Insurance. In 2016 operating profit was £253,000 but restructuring costs led to a loss of approximately £22,000 despite an increase in revenue to £47.3m from improved sales of 299,000 new policies and 90,000 renewals. That year saw a reduced income from Southern Rock of £22.1m but an increased £39.5m paid to Rock Services. The company's underlying profitability is difficult to assess because of a practice of recording administration expenses that closely track turnover. At the same time Southern Rock posted a loss of £32m in 2016, the fifth of seven years since 2010 it has made multimillion-pound losses on its core underwriting business and its solvency ratio dropped from 135% (2015) to 103% in 2016. According to Banks Eldons's profits leapt to £16.7m for the first half of 2017, saying that the company's business had been transformed by the same AI technology used in the Brexit campaign.

== See also ==
- Robert Mercer
