= Russian interference in the 2016 Brexit referendum =

Alleged foreign meddling campaign

Russian interference in the 2016 United Kingdom European Union membership referendum is a debated subject and remains unproven, though multiple sources argue evidence exists demonstrating that the Russian government attempted to influence British public opinion in favour of leaving the European Union. Investigations into this subject have been undertaken by the UK Electoral Commission, the UK Parliament's Culture Select Committee and Intelligence and Security Committee, and the United States Senate. "The Russia Report" published by the Intelligence and Security Committee of Parliament in July 2020 did not specifically address the Brexit campaign, but it concluded that Russian interference in UK politics is commonplace. It also found substantial evidence that there had been interference in the 2014 Scottish independence referendum.

== Timeline ==
=== Background ===
After the 2016 United Kingdom European Union membership referendum on the UK leaving the EU ("Brexit"), Prime Minister David Cameron suggested that Russia "might be happy" with a positive Brexit vote. The official Remain campaign accused the Kremlin of secretly backing a positive Brexit vote.

=== Before the vote ===
- 22 July 2014, Laurence Levy, a lawyer with the U.S. law firm Bracewell & Giuliani, advised U.S. heiress Rebekah Mercer, American media executive Steve Bannon, and British businessman Alexander Nix on the legality of their company, Cambridge Analytica, being involved in U.S. elections. He advised that Nix and any foreign nationals without a green card working for the company not be involved in any decisions about work the company performs for any clients related to U.S. elections. He further advised Nix to recuse himself from any involvement with the company's U.S. election work because he is not a U.S. citizen.
- 26–27 September 2015, during the UKIP annual conference at the Doncaster Racecourse, British political activist Andy Wigmore met Alexander Udod, a Russian diplomat and suspected Russian intelligence officer, who in 2018 was expelled from the U.K. in retaliation for the poisoning of Sergei and Yulia Skripal. In October, Udod arranged a November lunch for Wigmore, British businessman Arron Banks and the Russian ambassador to London, Alexander Yakovenko.
- 24 October 2015, Arron Banks sent an email to Steve Bannon and others to request help from Cambridge Analytica, where Bannon was a VP, with fundraising in the U.S. for the Leave.EU campaign. Foreign contributions to British political campaigns are illegal. Banks came under criminal investigation in 2018 in part over questions about Leave.EU's funding sources.
- 6 November 2015, Wigmore and Banks had lunch with Yakovenko at the ambassador's residence in London; they briefed him on Brexit. In a June 2018 interview, Wigmore told The Washington Post his goal for the meeting was to discuss finding a buyer for a banana plantation in Belize.
- 17 November 2015, Andy Wigmore, Banks, and Cambridge Analytica executive Brittany Kaiser launched the Leave.EU campaign. Yakovenko introduces Wigmore and Banks to Russian oligarch Siman Povarenkin and documents related to the meeting suggest Banks was offered business deals, per The Guardian reports from 2018.
- 16 February 2016 – Boris Johnson dined with Evgeny Lebedev, son of Russian oligarch Alexander Lebedev, shortly after Johnson backed the Leave campaign.
- March 2016, Philip Hammond, the former Secretary for Defence and Foreign Secretary (later the Chancellor of the Exchequer) stated in a speech "the only country who would like us to leave the EU is Russia".

=== After the 23 June 2016 vote ===
==== 2016 ====
- 21 July 2016, Wigmore and Nigel Farage encountered staffers for Mississippi Governor Phil Bryant at the bar in the Hilton Hotel. A staffer invited Wigmore and Farage to Mississippi.
- 12 November 2016, Banks, Farage and Wigmore visited Trump Tower unannounced and were invited inside by Bannon. They have a long meeting with Trump. Wigmore asked Trump's receptionist for the Trump transition team's contact information.
- December 2016, Ben Bradshaw MP claimed in Parliament that Russia had interfered in the Brexit referendum campaign. In February 2017, Bradshaw called on the British intelligence service, Government Communications Headquarters, then under Boris Johnson as Foreign Secretary, to reveal any information it had on Russian interference.

==== 2017 ====
- 26 February 2017, Andy Wigmore told The Guardian that Robert Mercer donated Cambridge Analytica's services to the Leave.EU campaign. The U.K. Electoral Commission said the donation was not declared.
- 16 March 2017, The American Association of Political Consultants (AAPC) gave an "International Consultant of the Year" award to Nigel Farage and Leave.EU in Huntington Beach, California.
- 17–25 March 2017, While in Orange County, California, Farage and Arron Banks attended GOP gatherings at Scott Baugh's invitation. Splitting California into two states is discussed at two of the gatherings. Afterwards The Washington Times and The Sunday Times, London reported that Baugh and Gerry Gunster were hiring Farage and Banks to help fundraise in California for a campaign to split the state in two. Baugh denies the story saying he only, "asked Farage if he would be interested in talking to some of the county's GOP movers and shakers.".
- October 2017, Members of Parliament in the Culture, Media and Sport Committee demanded that Facebook, Twitter, Google and other social media corporations disclose all adverts and details of payments by Russia in the Brexit campaign.
- November 2017, it became public knowledge that Matthew Elliott, the chief executive of Vote Leave, was a founding member of Conservative Friends of Russia, and had been a target asset by someone known to be a Russian spy.
- 12 December 2017, members of the US Congress Ruben Gallego, Eric Swalwell and Gerry Connolly wrote to the Director of National Intelligence requesting information on Russian interference in the Brexit vote. On 13 December 2017, Facebook stated that it found no significant Russian activity during Brexit, but this was immediately rejected by the committee chair, Damian Collins, as being information that was already public after US investigations into Russian interference.

==== 2018 ====
- January 2018, a US Senate minority report suggested possible ways Russia may have influenced the Brexit campaign. It stated,

The Russian government has sought to influence democracy in the United Kingdom through disinformation, cyber hacking, and corruption. While a complete picture of the scope and nature of Kremlin interference in the UK's June 2016 referendum is still emerging, Prime Minister Theresa May and the UK government have condemned the Kremlin's active measures, and various UK government entities, including the Electoral Commission and parliamentarians, have launched investigations into different aspects of possible Russian government meddling.

- 19 March 2018, Channel 4 broadcast its investigative documentary on Cambridge Analytica.
- June 2018, The Guardian suggested that Arron Banks, the biggest donor to the campaign for leaving, and co-organiser of Leave.EU received the offer of a Russian gold mine, and had had a series of meetings with the Russian Ambassador. On 14 June 2018, Banks appeared before Parliamentary committee hearing, where he appeared to admit to having lied about his engagements with Russians, and later walked out refusing to answer further questions by citing a luncheon appointment with the Democratic Unionist Party.
- July 2018, the House of Commons Culture, Media and Sport Select Committee, released an interim report on 'Disinformation and ‘fake news’', stating that Russia had engaged in "unconventional warfare" through Twitter and other social media against the United Kingdom, designed to amplify support for a "leave" vote in Brexit.
- 20 September 2018, AggregateIQ, a Canadian political consultancy and analytics company, received the first General Data Protection Regulation (GDPR) notice issued by the Information Commissioner's Office (ICO) for using people's data "for purposes which they would not have expected." Various pro-Brexit campaigns paid the company £3.5 million to target ads at prospective voters. While its Brexit work was before the GDPR went into effect, it was fined because it retained and continued to use the data after the GDPR came into full force. The company is affiliated with SCL Group and Cambridge Analytica, and Cambridge Analytica employees sometimes call AggregateIQ "our Canadian office."
- 1 November 2018, The British National Crime Agency opens a criminal investigation into Arron Banks upon referral from the Electoral Commission and concluded "we have reasonable grounds to suspect that: Mr Banks was not the true source of the £8m reported as loans" and "Various criminal offences may have been committed." The commission believes Banks facilitated a loan from Rock Holdings to his Leave.EU campaign. Rock Holdings is barred from funding campaigns in the U.K. under British election law because it is on the Isle of Man, which is a possession of the British Crown but not part of the United Kingdom.

==== 2019 ====
- February 2019, The Guardian reported that Brittany Kaiser, former business development director of SCL Group, was subpoenaed by Robert Mueller. Her spokesman said she was cooperating fully with his investigation. She was the first person with links to both Brexit and the Trump campaign known to have been questioned by Mueller.
- 17 October 2019, the Intelligence and Security Committee of the UK Parliament passed a completed report on allegations that Russian government-sponsored activities had an effect on the outcome of the referendum to Downing Street.
- 4 November 2019, Downing Street commented that the report received on 17 October will not be published prior to the 2019 UK General Election.

==== 2020 ====
- 21 July 2020, Russia Report by the Intelligence and Security Committee of Parliament was published.

==== 2023 ====
- 19 January 2023, the European Court of Human Rights in Strasbourg asked the UK government to respond to allegations of Russian interference. This follows requests from lawmakers from the Labour party, the SNP and the Green Party, and following a rejection of the case by the High Court of Justice in London in 2021.

==== 2026 ====
- 11 October 2026, Prime Minister Andy Burnham stated on The Rest Is Politics podcast that Russia did interfere with the Brexit referendum. "I've had the clear answer that, yes, there was", he said.
- 13 October 2026, MI5 Director General Sir Ken McCallum acknowledged attempted interference in the 2016 referendum by Russia. However, he stated that the operation was unsuccessful and drew a distinction between 'interference attempted and outcome swayed', warning against exaggerating the 'comparatively unimpressive' attempts.

== Social media ==
Ad influence in the Brexit referendum included the promotion of misinformation through both fake social media accounts and state-sponsored media outlets such as RT and Sputnik. In addition to interference in the 2016 U.S. presidential election, Russian trolls have previously been documented promoting fake claims of election fraud after the 2014 Scottish independence referendum and attempting to amplify the public impact of terrorist attacks, with Prime Minister Theresa May accusing the Russian government of “deploying its state-run media organisations to plant fake stories and photo-shopped images in an attempt to sow discord in the West and undermine our institutions”.

=== RT ===
According to a US senate report, Russian state media channel RT covered the referendum campaign extensively and offered "systematically one-sided coverage". A parliamentary inquiry into disinformation and 'fake news' cited research estimating the value of anti-EU Russian state media during the EU referendum campaign at between £1.4 and £4.14 million.

=== Twitter bots ===
Data released by Twitter in 2018 identified 3,841 accounts of Russian origin affiliated with the Internet Research Agency, as well as 770 potentially from Iran, which collectively sent over 10 million Tweets in "an effort to spread disinformation and discord", according to The Telegraph, with a "day-long blitz" on the day of the referendum. One study, with a sample of 1.5 million tweets containing hashtags relating to the referendum, found that almost a third of all tweets had been generated by just 1% of the 300,000 sampled accounts. They found that both pro-Leave and pro-Remain bots existed but that "the family of hashtags associated with the argument for leaving the EU dominates", with pro-Leave bots tweeting more than three times as often.

In November 2017, The Times reported that researchers from Swansea University and UC Berkeley had identified around 150,000 accounts with links to Russia that tweeted about Brexit in the run-up to the referendum. Others at City, University of London had previously documented a network of 794,949 accounts that tweeted about the referendum, of which 482,193 could be located geographically: only 30,122 of these were based in the UK, rather fewer than the 40,031 accounts designated as "deactivated, removed, blocked, set to private, or whose username was altered after the referendum". A working paper for the National Bureau of Economic Research claims the influence of Twitter bots may have been significant enough to impact the result, roughly calculating that automated accounts may have ultimately been responsible for around 1.76 percentage points of the 'Leave' vote share.

An analysis by cybersecurity firm F-Secure indicated that "suspicious activity" relating to Brexit-related posts on Twitter has continued after the referendum and into 2019, with Professor Jason Reifler of the University of Exeter commenting that the observed patterns of activity are consistent with tactics used by Russian troll farms.

== Questions about Arron Banks' funding ==
British Journalist Isabel Oakeshott stated in an article for the Times:

As part of my research I uncovered controversial information about links between Arron Banks and his associate Andy Wigmore and the Russian embassy in London. The relationship began in autumn 2015, when Banks was gearing up for the Brexit campaign, and continued throughout the referendum and beyond. The Kremlin was simply doing what it does so well: identifying individuals who might be useful to President Vladimir Putin’s geopolitical aims and seeing what might come of it.

In Banks and Wigmore it literally struck gold. In due course, Banks would become the single biggest donor to the Brexit campaign, putting him at the heart of British politics. Banks and Wigmore genuinely sympathised — and continue to sympathise — with some of Putin’s political views. Banks, after all, is married to a Russian. My analysis is that Banks and Wigmore were shamelessly used by the Russians.

— Isabel Oakeshott, Times

Arron Banks was the largest donor to the Brexit campaign. Prior to the donations, Southern Rock, Banks' underwriting company was technically insolvent and needed to find £60m to meet regulations. It was saved by a £77m cash injection, mostly in September 2015 from another company, ICS Risk Solutions. According to openDemocracy, when questioned by MP Rebecca Pow, "Banks implied that this was simply him shuffling money between two companies he owns". They have also reported that, while Banks has stated that he owns 90 per cent of the company he appears to actually own between 50 and 75% according to filings from a subsidiary, "suggest[ing] there may be an undeclared shareholder."

At the time, Louise Kentish of a company called STM joined the board. The day after the referendum, her husband Alan Kentish, CEO of STM and two other STM people joined as well. STM specialises in opaque wealth management using trusts and similar.

Around the same time, September 2015, Banks, along with Andy Wigmore, started having multiple meetings with Russian officials posted at the Russian embassy in London.

Also according to his South African business partner, Christopher Kimber, Banks had been in Russia trying to raise funds around that time: "I was finally made aware in October [2015] that in truth, Banks had been dealing with Russians who contemplated investing in the mines.... I was informed by Banks that he had travelled to Russia and discussed with them the diamond opportunities as well as gold mining opportunities in Russia. He further indicated that he would be meeting with the Russians again during November [2015]."

Months after the cash injection Banks started making large donations to political causes including the £8m to the Brexit campaigns. The UK's Electoral Commission stated "we have reasonable grounds to suspect that: Mr Banks was not the true source of the £8m reported as loans" leading to the 2018 criminal investigation of Banks.

Banks states there was no Russian money and sent financial statements to the BBC's Newsnight programme to prove it but an email attached to the statements included the text "Redact the reference for Ural Properties and any references which include sensitive info e.g. the account numbers the money was sent from." Newsnight featured a story about this on 8 November 2018. It remains to be seen which accounts these are or what Ural Properties, a Gibraltar-based company, does.

On 13 September 2019, the Metropolitan Police concluded that while "it is clear that whilst some technical breaches of electoral law were committed by Leave.EU in respect of the spending return submitted for their campaign, there is insufficient evidence to justify any further criminal investigation", and on 24 September 2019, the National Crime Agency said it had found no evidence of criminality in respect of the issues raised by the Electoral Commission and that no further action would be taken. This left investigations of Banks closed.

== Russia report ==
On 17 October 2019, the Intelligence and Security Committee of Parliament delivered to the Government "The Russia report" into allegations of Russian interference in British politics, including alleged Russian interference in the referendum. The government (led by Prime Minister Boris Johnson), which formally has authority to control the timing of its release to the public, refused to do so before the 2019 United Kingdom general election in December. A number of legal actions tried to force the government to publish it. In November, the Bureau of Investigative Journalism started a crowdfunding exercise to raise funds for legal action to force the British government to release the report. In July 2020 the report was released by the ISC led by chairman Julian Lewis MP

The report said the government “had not seen or sought evidence of successful interference in UK democratic processes,” and an official UK government response said: “We have seen no evidence of successful interference in the EU referendum.”

The report also stated that the government had made minimal effort to investigate potential Russian interference into the Brexit referendum other than consulting open-source commentary. The report discussed more broadly Russian interference in British politics, including an extensive "laundromat" of Russian investment into the United Kingdom often connected to the Russian state and the Putin-linked elite. It discussed the likely effect on politics and that many members of the House of Lords have business interests in Russia. The report stated that no government ministry took significant interest or specific responsibility in investigation, and that the British intelligence community believed election integrity was not a major focus. It stated the presence of Russian intelligence in the UK is significant and poses a risk to Russian expatriates who criticise Putin.

The report describes the United Kingdom as one of Russia's "top targets" and said it is "seen as central to the Western anti-Russian lobby".

In September 2020, the Electoral Commission raised concerns about Russia-linked donations to the Tories that occurred prior to the Brexit referendum. In October 2021, the Pandora Papers revealed more information about the potentially Kremlin-linked donations and multiple others.

== See also ==
- Allegations of Russian interference in the 2024 Romanian Presidential elections
- Carole Cadwalladr - investigative journalist sued by Arron Banks
- Criminal charges brought in the Mueller special counsel investigation
- Cyberwarfare by Russia
- Foundations of Geopolitics, a geopolitical book by Aleksandr Dugin, advocating a sophisticated program of subversion, destabilization, and disinformation spearheaded by the Russian secret services. The isolation of the UK is a key part of a plan called the "Finlandization of Europe".
- Foreign electoral intervention
- Russian interference in British politics
- Russian interference in the 2016 United States elections
- Russian Laundromat
- Russia–NATO relations
- Russia–United Kingdom relations
- Timeline of Russian interference in the 2016 United States elections
- Timeline of investigations into Trump and Russia (January–June 2017)
- Timeline of investigations into Trump and Russia (July–December 2017)
- Timeline of investigations into Trump and Russia (January–June 2018)
- Timeline of investigations into Trump and Russia (July–December 2018)
- Timeline of investigations into Trump and Russia (2019–2020)
- Tony Fabrizio
- Unconventional warfare
- Unit 29155
- Unlawful campaigning in the 2016 EU referendum
- R (Wilson) v Prime Minister, a legal case on declaring the Brexit referendum void
