= Russian interference in British politics =

A redacted parliamentary committee report detailing Russian interference in British business and politics

According to the Intelligence and Security Committee Russia report, released on 21 July 2020, there is substantial evidence that Russian interference in the British economy and politics is commonplace; further to this, evidence was uncovered detailing interference in the 2014 Scottish independence referendum aimed at promoting Scottish independence in an attempt to divide and conquer the UK. The report described the UK as one of Russia's "top targets" as it was "seen as central to the Western anti-Russian lobby".

According to the report, British governments have "welcomed the [Russian] oligarchs and their money with open arms, providing them with a means of recycling illicit finance through the London 'laundromat', and connections at the highest levels with access to U.K. companies and political figures". The committee was not authorised by the UK government to investigate whether Russian interference had affected the Brexit referendum, since any such investigation was not within the purview of UK intelligence services because any such actions by the security services themselves could be seen as interference, itself undermining democracy.

== See also ==
- Russian interference in the 2016 Brexit referendum
- Russian Laundromat
