= Brightside Group =

Financial services company

- Type: Limited Company
- Industry: Insurance & Finance
- Founded: 2005
- Headquarters: Bristol, UK
- Number of employees: 640
- Website: http://www.brightsideinsurance.co.uk

Brightside Group is an insurance broking and financial services business in the UK. The company was incorporated in 2006, is based in Bristol with offices in Southampton, and Torquay.

== History ==
Brightside is registered in the UK and is regulated by the Financial Conduct Authority (FCA). In June 2008 a reverse takeover took place between Aust Holdings Limited and Brightside Group Plc. Brightside Group Plc acquired Group Direct and its associated companies, changing its principal business activity from financial rehabilitation solutions to insurance broking. In the same deal Brightside Group acquired Injury QED which provides solicitors with medical reports for personal injury claims. The Brightside acquisition included a strategic investment from Aviva-owned insurer Norwich Union and Swedish based Stena Investments. For the six months ending June 2010 revenue grew 24% from £21.4 million in 2009 to £26.6m. In December 2009, the Group raised £20m in additional capital to expand online offerings and the development of its medical reporting business, Injury QED, and in June 2010 the Group acquired the eCar and eBike brands to substantially increase distribution and represented an additional 307,000 policies.

=== Problems with ex CEO ===
Arron Banks co-founded Brightside Group in 2005, and was appointed CEO in June 2011, at which time the company was listed on the Alternative Investment Market (AIM). The board accepted the resignation from Arron Banks, effective 20 June 2012. Following Banks departure a bitter dispute followed including legal action from Southern Rock Insurance Company, which is owned by Banks.

=== AnaCap takeover ===
In 2014 the company was de-listed from the AIM Stockexchange and purchased by AnaCap Financial Partners LLC at £1.27 per share. In 2015 the company underwent a rebrand, becoming known simply as brightside.

== Company Results ==
On 28 September 2010, Brightside Group released its Preliminary Results for the first six months of 2010 (unaudited):

- Profit from continuing operations increased by 33% to £4m in the first six months of 2010 (same period in 2009 £3m)
- Revenue increased by 24% to £26.6m in the first six months of 2010 (same period in 2009 £21.4m)
- EBITDA before exceptional items and share option charges increased by 11% to £4.97m in the first six months of 2010 (same period in 2009 £4.48m)
- Earnings per share on profit from continuing operations increased by 3% to 0.65p in the first six months of 2010 (same period in 2009 0.63p)
- In 2014 the company made a £43.7 million loss.

== Associated companies ==
Brightside Group incorporates:

- Commercial Vehicle Direct
- Brightside Insurance
- One Insurance Solution
- Logical Choice
- ProSport Insurance Services

The Group's key insurance areas are van, taxi, business, home, car, motorhome, minibus, caravan, property, tradesman and corporate.
