= 2025 West of England mayoral election =

Local election in the UK

2025 West of England election
- 1 May 2025
- Registered: 682,961
- Turnout: 30.0% (▼6.6 pp)
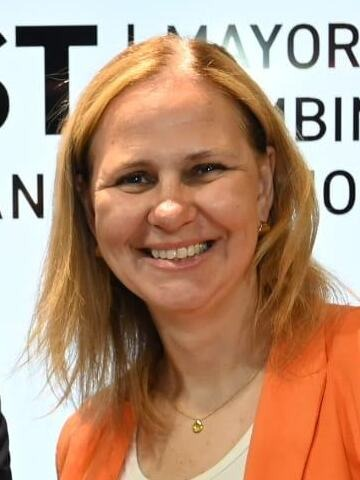

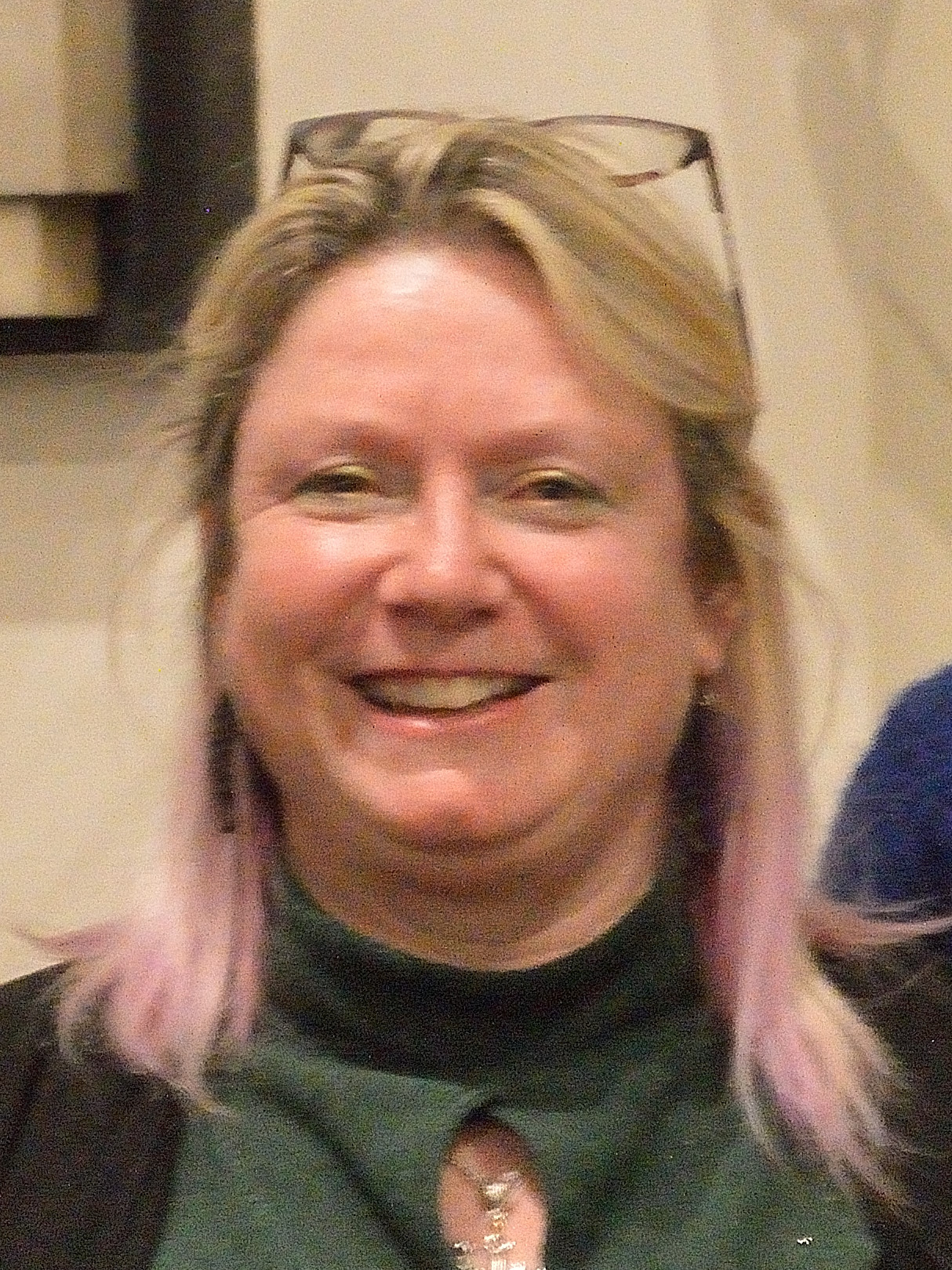

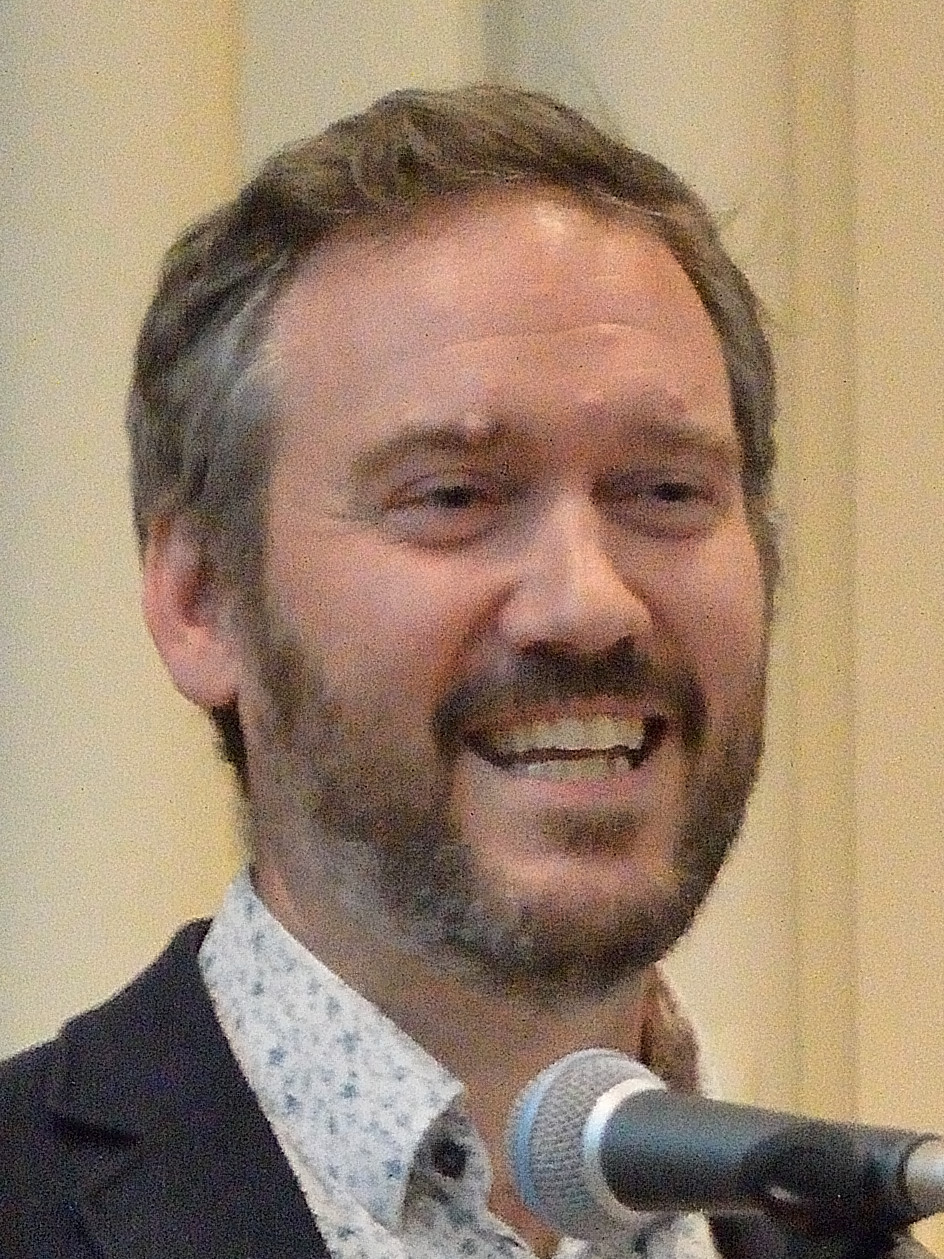

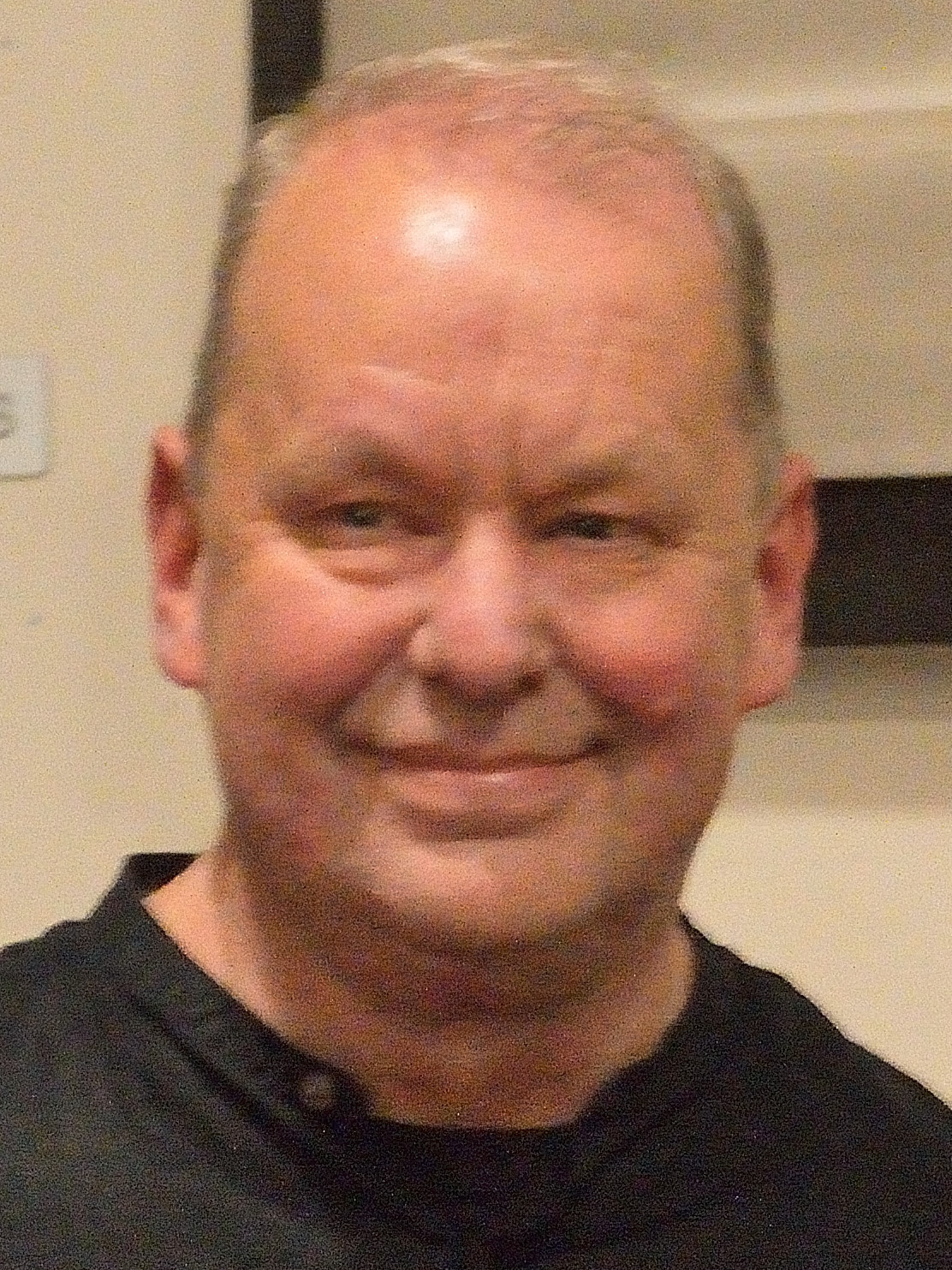
	First party	Second party	Third party
Candidate	Helen Godwin	Arron Banks	Mary Page
Party	Labour	Reform	Green
Last election	33.4%	Did not run	21.7%
Popular vote	51,197	45,252	41,094
Percentage	25.0%	22.1%	20.0%
Swing	▼8.4 pp	New	▼1.7 pp
	Fourth party	Fifth party	Sixth party
Candidate	Steve Smith	Oli Henman	Ian Scott
Party	Conservative	Liberal Democrats	Independent
Last election	28.6%	16.3%	Did not run
Popular vote	34,092	28,711	4,682
Percentage	16.6%	14.0%	2.3%
Swing	▼12.0 pp	▼2.3 pp	New
Mayor before election
Dan Norris
Independent (Note: While Norris was elected as the Labour mayor of WECA, he was suspended from the Labour party on 4 April 2025.)
Elected Mayor
Helen Godwin
Labour

The 2025 West of England mayoral election was held on 1 May 2025 to elect the mayor of the West of England on the same day as other local elections across the country. It was the third election for the role and was won by Labour's Helen Godwin. For the first time, the mayor was elected using the first-past-the-post voting system.

== Background ==
The West of England Combined Authority (WECA) was created in 2017 as a statutory body which covers the local authority areas of Bristol, South Gloucestershire, and Bath and North East Somerset. It broadly resembles the Avon county that existed from 1974 to 1996, but excludes North Somerset because that council opposed joining the combined authority, although they collaborate on some projects. In October 2020, there were discussions around North Somerset joining the WECA in time for the May 2021 election, but councillors in Bristol voted down this proposal in early 2021.

The mayor of the West of England is the directly elected head of the WECA. Under a devolution deal agreed in 2017, they have powers over an annual allocation from the government, to fund transport management, strategic planning of land and housing and adult education.

=== Arrest of Dan Norris ===
In April 2025, incumbent mayor Norris was arrested on suspicion of rape, child sex offences, child abduction and misconduct in a public office. In a statement, Avon and Somerset Police said: "Most of the offences are alleged to have occurred in the 2000s but we're also investigating an alleged offence of rape from the 2020s". He was released on conditional bail for enquiries to continue. He was suspended by the Labour Party on 4 April 2025.

On 8 April 2025, it was confirmed that Norris had been banned from the Parliamentary Estate while a risk assessment was being undertaken, following the accusations made against him. Norris was also banned from entering the WECA headquarters in Bristol, and had his access to the Combined Authority's IT system deactivated. While he was also banned from attending meetings on behalf of WECA, he was not suspended as mayor because "there is no provision" under WECA's constitution for this action.

== Electoral system ==
The first past the post system was used to elect the mayor; in this system the candidate with the most votes wins. Previous elections for the mayor had used the supplementary vote system. In 2024, the Electoral Reform Society described the change as lowering the bar for politicians and thus damaging British democracy.

== Candidates ==
=== Labour ===
A rule change approved at the Labour Party's annual conference in September 2024 had the effect that incumbent Labour Mayor Dan Norris would be ineligible to seek re-election. Under the new rule, an existing ban on councillors remaining in their local government roles if they are elected to the House of Commons is extended to other officeholders, including directly elected mayors. Norris had successfully stood for the newly created North East Somerset and Hanham parliamentary constituency in the July 2024 general election.

There were three candidates on the shortlist to become the Labour Party candidate:

- Nicola Beech, former councillor and cabinet member of Bristol City Council
- Helen Godwin, former councillor and cabinet member of Bristol City Council
- Tom Renhard, Bristol Labour group leader and Bristol City councillor

On 21 November 2024, the Labour Party announced that Helen Godwin had been selected as its candidate.

=== Conservative ===
There were three candidates on the shortlist to become the Conservative Party candidate:

- Steve Smith, a former Lord Mayor and Bristol City Councillor
- Samuel Williams, the Conservative nominee for the 2021 West of England mayoral election (who was mistakenly identified as the nominee by Bristol Live prior to the selection meeting)
- Toby Savage, former Leader of South Gloucestershire Council

After a meeting on 9 November 2024, Conservative members selected Steve Smith as their candidate.

=== Green ===
- Mary Page, 2024 Green Party candidate for Bristol North West

The Green Party originally announced that Heather Mack had been selected as its candidate on 20 November 2024. However, on 9 January 2025, Mack stepped down, and was replaced by Mary Page.

=== Liberal Democrats ===
On 21 January 2025, the Liberal Democrats elected Bath and North East Somerset councillor Oli Henman as the party's candidate for the mayorship.

=== Independent ===
Ian Scott, a South Gloucestershire Labour councillor, announced he would stand as an independent candidate after he was not shortlisted for the Labour nomination. He had made a formal complaint, claiming age and sex discrimination, on the basis that only the three eldest candidates were removed in the shortlisting process. On 30 January 2025, the Labour Party announced it had expelled him from the party.

=== Reform UK ===
On 28 March 2025, Arron Banks was announced as the Reform UK candidate during the party's election launch.

== Opinion polling ==
Dates conducted	Pollster	Client	Sample size	Godwin Lab	Smith Con	Page Grn	Henman LD	Banks Ref	Scott Ind	Lead
1 May 2025	2025 mayoral election		–	25.0%	16.6%	20.0%	14.0%	22.1%	2.3%	2.9
29–30 Apr 2025	Find Out Now	N/A	840	19%	17%	24%	11%	25%	5%	1
15–23 Apr 2025	More in Common	The Observer	998	23%	21%	18%	15%	18%	5%	2
9–23 Apr 2025	YouGov	N/A	1,165	23%	17%	27%	13%	18%	2%	4
6 May 2021	2021 mayoral election (1st round)		–	33.4%	28.6%	21.7%	16.3%	–	–	4.8

== Results ==
The election was won by Helen Godwin, the Labour Party candidate, with 25% of the vote. The change in the tables below reflect the difference from the first round of votes in the 2021 election.

=== Overall ===
2025 West of England mayoral election
Party	Candidate	Votes	%	±%
Labour	Helen Godwin	51,197	25.0	–8.4
Reform	Arron Banks	45,252	22.1	N/A
Green	Mary Page	41,094	20.0	–1.7
Conservative	Steve Smith	34,092	16.6	–12.0
Liberal Democrats	Oli Henman	28,711	14.0	–2.3
Independent	Ian Scott	4,682	2.3	N/A
Majority		5,945	2.9	–1.9
Rejected ballots		529		
Turnout		205,557	30.00	–6.6
Labour hold		Swing	–15.3	

=== By local authority ===
==== Bath and North East Somerset ====
2025 West of England mayoral election (Bath and North East Somerset)
Party	Candidate	Votes	%	±%
Liberal Democrats	Oli Henman	9,942	23.2	+3.3
Labour	Helen Godwin	8,764	20.5	–11.4
Reform	Arron Banks	8,586	20.1	N/A
Conservative	Steve Smith	8,522	19.9	–12.3
Green	Mary Page	6,250	14.6	–1.4
Independent	Ian Scott	741	1.7	N/A

==== Bristol ====
2025 West of England mayoral election (Bristol)
Party	Candidate	Votes	%	±%
Labour	Helen Godwin	29,991	30.8	–5.8
Green	Mary Page	27,452	28.2	–0.1
Reform	Arron Banks	17,220	17.7	N/A
Conservative	Steve Smith	11,335	11.6	–9.1
Liberal Democrats	Oli Henman	9,632	9.9	–4.7
Independent	Ian Scott	1,890	1.9	N/A

==== South Gloucestershire ====
2025 West of England mayoral election (South Gloucestershire)
Party	Candidate	Votes	%	±%
Reform	Arron Banks	19,446	30.1	N/A
Conservative	Steve Smith	14,235	22.0	–20.0
Labour	Helen Godwin	12,442	19.2	–8.8
Liberal Democrats	Oli Henman	9,137	14.1	–3.0
Green	Mary Page	7,392	11.4	–1.5
Independent	Ian Scott	2,051	3.2	N/A

== Analysis ==
Thom Oliver, a lecturer in politics at the University of the West of England and part of the Bristol Civic Leadership project studying mayoral governance in the area, wrote that with turnout of about 30%, and the mayor winning with 25% of the vote, the mayor had won with just 7.5% of the electorate voting for her. He stated that "directly elected mayors derive their legitimacy from a clear and personal democratic mandate" giving them local authority for bold actions, and expressed concern whether the mayor had a good mandate.
