= Tanja Bueltmann =

German historian and university teacher

- Born: 1979 (age 46–47); Bielefeld, Germany
- Citizenship: German & British

Academic background
- Education: Bielefeld University; Victoria University of Wellington

Academic work
- Discipline: Historian
- Sub-discipline: History of human migration; Diaspora studies; European emigration
- Institutions: Northumbria University; University of Strathclyde

Tanja Bueltmann, FRHistS (born 1979) is a German-British historian and academic, who holds the chair in International History at the University of Strathclyde. She specialises in the history of human migration and diaspora. She is also a citizens' rights campaigner and founder of the EU Citizens' Champion campaign.

== Education ==
Bueltmann studied British Cultural Studies, History and Sociology at Bielefeld University, also spending a year at the University of Edinburgh as an Erasmus study abroad student, receiving an MA in 2005. Participation in the Erasmus study abroad programme "laid the roots for her subsequent research and career". She was a PhD candidate with the Irish-Scottish studies programme at the Victoria University of Wellington, with her PhD research funded by the New Zealand government's New Zealand International Doctoral Research Scholarship scheme. While she was a PhD student, Bueltmann published several papers and appeared in national media.

== Career ==
Bueltmann's research interests are in diaspora history, particularly in connection to Scottish and English immigrant communities.

In 2011, Bueltmann published her thesis "Scottish Ethnicity and the Making of New Zealand Society, 1850-1930", in which she "sets the scene for Scottish migration to New Zealand". In 2012, she focused on English communities overseas, co-editing a collection entitled Locating the English Diaspora, 1500-2010. She continued to research the movement of Scots overseas, and, in 2015, co-edited The Scottish Diaspora together with Professor Graeme Morton and Dr Andrew Hinson. Later that year she published Clubbing Together: Ethnicity, Civility and Formal Sociability in the Scottish Diaspora to 1930, investigating Scottish ethnicity and associational activism. The book is the 2015 winner of the Saltire Society Scottish Research Book of the Year award. In 2017, Bueltmann published the co-authored monograph The English Diaspora in North America: Migration, Ethnicity and Association, 1730s-1950s, the output of an AHRC funded grant.

Bueltmann argues that amid the uproar about migrant populations trying to seek refuge within the UK, it is easy to forget the historic outward migration of Britons. More recently, she has also examined the collective action being taken by EU citizens in the UK in response to Brexit.

Bueltmann is a Fellow of the Royal Historical Society (FRHistS) and Fellow of the Higher Education Academy (FHEA).

Bueltmann worked at Northumbria University from February 2009 until July 2020, when she became chair in International History at the University of Strathclyde.

== The UK's EU referendum and Brexit ==
Bueltmann is vocal in her support for Britain remaining in the European Union. As her research is focused on migration history, and she is a German living in the UK, her concern about Brexit is both professional and personal. She was a member of the lobbying group "Historians for Britain in Europe" and describes herself as an EU citizen. Before the referendum, Bueltmann voiced concerns that the "tolerant UK I love seems to be vanishing". After becoming a public figure for the Remain movement, she received abusive messages. She was not surprised by the outcome of the EU referendum, but, as many others, has been troubled by the events since.

In March 2017 she attended Newcastle's pro-EU rally, and, when interviewed by the BBC, said she had moved from Germany to "contribute to life and society in the UK and I think I've been doing that every single day since I arrived eight years ago". She was a guest speaker at the People's March for Europe in London in September 2017. Since Britain's vote to leave the EU, she has written articles for a number of newspapers and online platforms, including The Guardian, HuffPost UK, and Metro.

Bueltmann has publicly spoken out against the government's Brexit reassurances. She remains concerned about the rights of EU citizens in the UK, and Britons who live in the EU, and continues to take a vocal stand against their being used as bargaining chips in negotiations. When the government made a plea for EU academics to remain in the UK, Bueltmann told The Independent newspaper: "if they really meant they want us to stay, they would have guaranteed our rights fully on 24 June 2016". She later argued in the Times Higher Education, in a rebuttal to the then Immigration Minister Brandon Lewis's article addressed to EU nationals working in Higher Education, that what everyone failed to see was that the UK is not the destination for EU nationals, but their home.

Since the EU referendum Bueltmann has focused primarily on the situation of the more than three million EU citizens at home in the UK and fighting for the protection of their rights. She is working with other campaigners, politicians and policy organisations, including the German Friedrich-Ebert-Stiftung.

In July 2018, Bueltmann founded the EU Citizens' Champion campaign to facilitate that work. The campaign serves two purposes: to support the3million, the UK's leading not for profit organisation working to protect EU citizens’ rights, with a fundraiser, and to facilitate engagement activities that help change the narrative about freedom of movement and migration. The campaign launch video - a satire on settled status - features actor and director David Schneider.
