= Andy Wigmore =

British-Belizean political activist, former diplomat and sportsman

- Born: 1 June 1966 (age 59); Chipping Norton, Oxfordshire, England
- Citizenship: Belize, United Kingdom
- Education: Sacred Heart College, Droitwich
- Title: Honourable, Senior Justice of the Peace of Belize
- Term: 2012–present
- Political party: Reform UK
- Spouse: Cath Wigmore
- Children: 2

Andrew Bruce Wigmore (born 1 June 1966) is a British-Belizean political activist, former diplomat and sportsman. He is known for his work on the Leave.EU campaign during the UK's 2016 referendum on membership of the European Union, being a prominent associate of Arron Banks and Nigel Farage, and representing Belize in competitive trap shooting in the 2014 Commonwealth Games.

== Life ==
Andrew Wigmore was born on 1 June 1966 in Chipping Norton, Oxfordshire. Wigmore is half-Belizean, and holds dual citizenship of Belize and the United Kingdom. He attended the Sacred Heart College in Droitwich in Worcestershire.

Andrew Wigmore said in June 2018: "My dad worked in Berlin during the Cold War in a place called the Berlin Air Safety Centre, which was an organisation that looks after the air corridors. They worked with the Soviets 24/7. My dad interacted with the Soviets. I grew up in that environment in Berlin. I met many of the Soviets; I was fascinated by everything that went on in Berlin during the Cold War (...) my Dad dragged me out of bed at some ungodly hour to go and watch a piece of history, which was the last spy swap at Glienicke Bridge".

Wigmore has worked in communications mainly privately until 2016 when he was director of communications for Arron Banks' Leave.EU campaign.

He also held a role as a trade, commercial and press attaché at the Belize High Commission in London, a diplomatic position bound by the Vienna Convention. Following Wigmore's highly publicised meeting with then President-elect of the United States Donald Trump complaints arose regarding Wigmore forgoing his "duty not to interfere in the internal affairs [of another country]" as an accredited diplomat. Wigmore's role with the Belizean High commission ended on 23 January 2017.

From September 2015, Wigmore, along with Arron Banks, had multiple meetings with Russian officials posted at the Russian embassy in London. The first contact was with Russian diplomat and suspected spy Alexander Udod, in order to ask for a meeting with Russia's ambassador to Britain Alexander Vladimirovich Yakovenko. In 2018, Wigmore was accused by Culture, Media and Sport Select Committee Chair Damian Collins of misleading Parliament over the nature of his relationship with officials at the Russian embassy.

It was alleged in 2021 that Wigmore sent abusive messages online to journalist Carole Cadwalladr, for which he was subsequently suspended from Twitter.

== Shooting ==
Wigmore represented Belize at the 2014 Commonwealth Games in trap shooting. He competed in the men's trap event ranking 31st and 36th respectively on the first and second day of qualification. He failed to qualify any further. He also attempted to represent Belize again at the Rio Olympics but failed to qualify.

== Personal life ==
Wigmore is married and has two children.

== See also ==
- Russian interference in the 2016 Brexit referendum
