= Intelligence and Security Committee Russia report =

British investigation into allegations of Russian interference in British politics

The redacted Russia report was publicly released on 21 July 2020 by the Intelligence and Security Committee of Parliament.

The Intelligence and Security Committee Russia report, more commonly known as the Russia report, is the report of the British Intelligence and Security Committee of Parliament (ISC) into allegations of Russian interference in British politics, including alleged Russian interference in the 2016 Brexit referendum and the 2014 Scottish independence referendum. The committee completed the report in March 2019 and it was published in July 2020, after claims were made that delays to its publication were due to government machinations. According to the report, there is substantial evidence that Russian interference in British politics is commonplace.

== Inquiry ==
The inquiry began in November 2017, and a 50-page report was completed in March 2019. The report thereafter went through a process of redaction by intelligence and security agencies and was sent to Prime Minister Boris Johnson on 17 October 2019.

=== Expert witnesses ===
The committee used the following external expert witnesses.

- Professor Anne Applebaum – Institute of Global Affairs
- William Browder – Head of the Global Magnitsky Justice Movement
- Christopher Donnelly CMG TD – Head of the Institute for Statecraft
- Edward Lucas – Writer and consultant specialising in European and transatlantic security
- Christopher Steele – Director, Orbis Business Intelligence Ltd

== Publication delay ==
Johnson's government refused to release the report to the public before the general election in December 2019. In November, Christopher Pincher, a junior minister at the Foreign Office, said "it is not unusual for a review of ISC reports to take some time" after Emily Thornberry, opposition foreign affairs spokeswoman, said the decision not to publish was unjustifiable. A number of legal actions were begun to try to force the government to publish the report: one brought by the widow of the murdered Russian dissident Alexander Litvinenko, and another by the Bureau of Investigative Journalism.

The Prime Minister approved its release on 13 December 2019, the day after the general election. Johnson pledged in Prime Minister's Questions in February 2020 that the report would be released, but said it could not be released until the Intelligence and Security Committee (which disbanded following the dissolution of parliament ahead of the election) was reconstituted; a former chair of the committee, Dominic Grieve, said that this was an "entirely bogus" reason for delaying publication. Grieve had earlier said that the time between approval of release and publication was typically 10 days.

By June 2020, the report had still not been released, and the Intelligence and Security Committee had not been convened, the longest gap since the committee's creation in 1994. This prompted a cross-party group of 30 MPs to urge the committee to be reconstituted and the report to be published, writing that serious issues of "transparency and integrity" of the democratic process were raised by the withholding of the report.

== Publication and content ==
The report was published on 21 July 2020 and was not expected to name individuals and parts of the report were classified due to their sensitive intelligence material and subsequently censored. An uncensored report was available on an "eyes only" basis.

== Conclusions ==
According to the report, there is substantial evidence that Russian interference in British politics is commonplace. According to the Guardian, the main points of the report are:

- UK government failed to investigate evidence of successful interference in democratic processes
- ‘Credible open-source commentary’ suggesting Russia sought to influence the Scottish independence referendum
- Russian influence in the UK is ‘the new normal’
- Links between Russian elite and UK politics
- Intelligence community ‘took its eye off the ball’ on Russia
- UK's paper-and-pencil voting system makes direct interference harder
- Defending UK's democratic processes is a ‘hot potato’
- Errors in Salisbury poisoning and weapons watchdog hack do not diminish Moscow threat
- New legislation needed to replace outdated spy laws.

The report describes the United Kingdom as one of Russia's "top targets" and said it is "seen as central to the Western anti-Russian lobby".

Since the government had not authorised any investigation into the matter, the committee found no evidence that Russian interference had affected the Brexit referendum. Any such attempt without specific authorisation was not within the purview of British intelligence services as any such actions by the security services themselves could be seen as interference, itself undermining democracy.

However, the report did discover some evidence of co-ordinated interference in online narratives following the 2014 Scottish independence referendum in efforts to spread uncertainty over the result.

== Reactions ==
The content of the report was described by the Russian government as "fake-shaped Russophobia".

== See also ==
- Mueller Report
