= Brittany Kaiser =

Former Director of Business Development at Cambridge Analytica

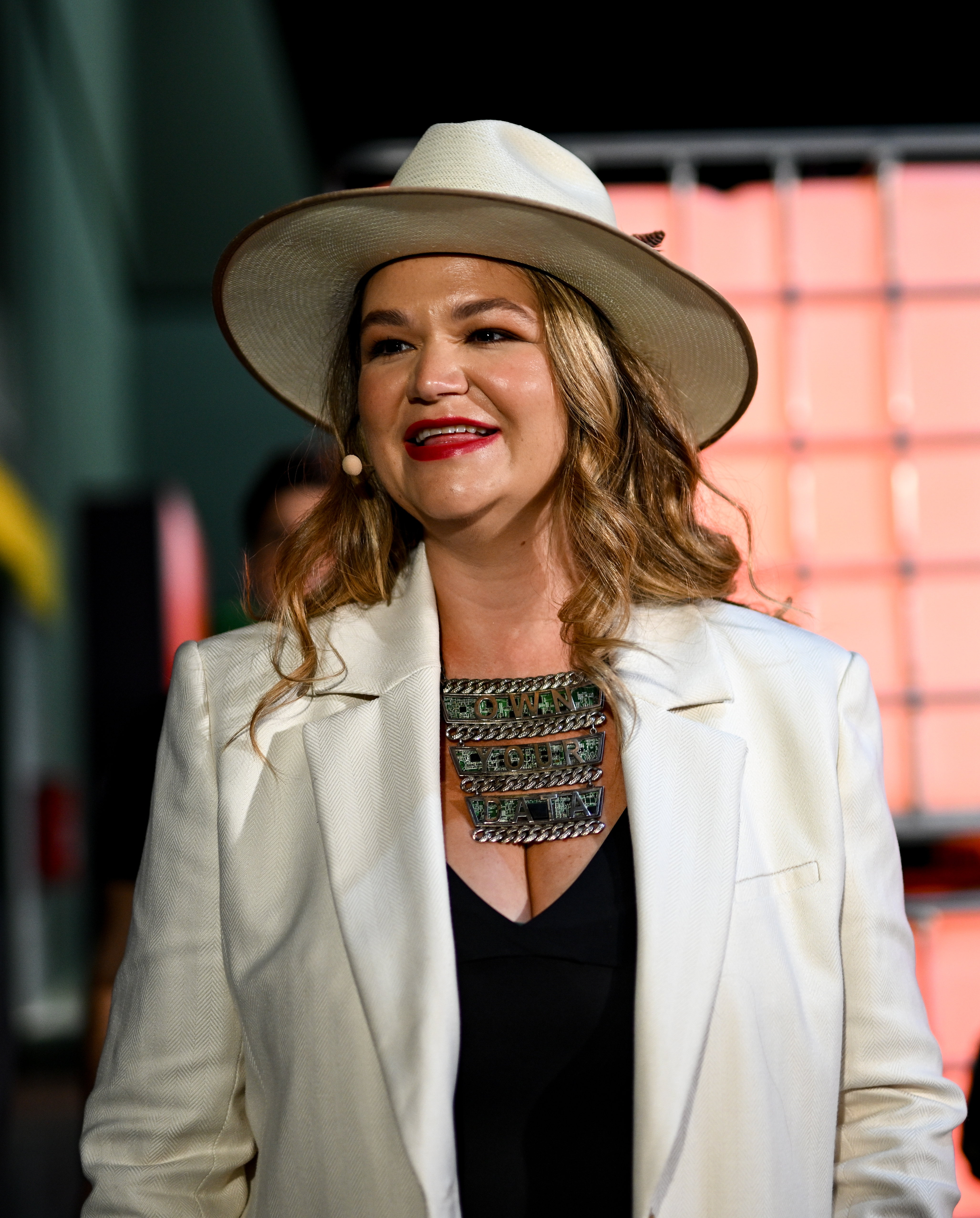
- Kaiser in 2025
- Born: Brittany Nicole Kaiser; November 6, 1987 (age 38); Houston, Texas, U.S.

Brittany Nicole Kaiser (born November 6, 1987) is the former business development director for Cambridge Analytica, which collapsed after details of its misuse of Facebook data became public. Cambridge Analytica potentially influenced voting in the UK Brexit referendum and the 2016 U.S. presidential election. Kaiser testified about her involvement in the work of Cambridge Analytica before a select committee of the UK Parliament and to the Mueller investigation.

== Early life ==
Kaiser was born in Houston and grew up in Lincoln Park on the North Side of Chicago. Her father worked in real estate development and her mother worked for Enron. She has a sister named Natalie.

Kaiser attended elementary school in Chicago until she moved to attend Phillips Academy Andover in 2005, then went on to study at the University of Edinburgh, the City University of Hong Kong, the University of London’s Birkbeck College, and earned certificates of study at the World Bank Institute and US Institute of Peace. She later obtained her Doctor of Philosophy from Middlesex University. Her main focuses during her studies were international relations and human rights

== Career ==
While she was studying at the University of Edinburgh, Kaiser took time off to work on Barack Obama's media team during his presidential campaign in 2007. During this time, she volunteered for Howard Dean's presidential campaign and Barack Obama's senatorial campaign, later becoming part of the small new media team for Obama's 2007/08 presidential campaign. She also worked for Amnesty International as a lobbyist appealing for an end to crimes against humanity.

=== SCL/Cambridge Analytica (2015–2018) ===
Between February 2015 and January 2018, Kaiser worked full-time for the SCL Group, the parent company of Cambridge Analytica, as director of business development. During her time at Cambridge Analytica, Kaiser worked under senior management, including CEO Alexander Nix. Following the Facebook–Cambridge Analytica data scandal, Kaiser fled to Thailand. In 2018, she testified before the digital, culture, media and sport select committee of the UK Parliament that far more than 87 million people may have had their Facebook data harvested by Cambridge Analytica, and discussed privacy issues posed by Facebook. In April 2018, Kaiser started a Facebook campaign appealing for transparency, called #OwnYourData.

Kaiser is one of the subjects of the Netflix documentary The Great Hack, talking about her work with Cambridge Analytica. The documentary provides details about how Cambridge Analytica used data brokers and an online app to accumulate information on tens of millions of Facebook users, gathering data on a massive scale.

Kaiser's memoir, Targeted: The Cambridge Analytica Whistleblower's Inside Story of How Big Data, Trump, and Facebook Broke Democracy and How It Can Happen Again, was published by Harper in October 2019. The book details how companies are illegally using data to influence people's choices.

In a 2019 interview with the BBC, Kaiser said she wanted Facebook to ban political advertising.

=== After SCL ===
In June 2019, Kaiser was appointed to the advisory board of Phunware, a tech company that collects smartphone location and user data. The company became involved in the Trump 2020 reelection campaign through a $3 million contract awarded by Brad Parscale's American Made Media Consultants. Kaiser resigned from the board.

On New Year's Day 2020, Kaiser began to release internal documents from Cambridge Analytica links to material on elections in Brazil, Kenya and Malaysia.

In an online interview with Philippine media outlet Rappler on July 15, 2020, Kaiser revealed that former Senator Ferdinand "Bongbong" Marcos Jr, son of the late dictator Ferdinand Marcos Sr, had approached Cambridge Analytica with a request to do a "rebranding" of the family's image. She described the efforts of the Marcos family to rebrand their family image as an example of historical revisionism in a data-driven and scientific way. This request was said to have brought up heavy debate among the staff at Cambridge Analytica, but was nevertheless accepted by CEO Alexander Nix, as it was a financial opportunity. Rappler requested a comment from Marcos' spokesperson Vic Rodriguez, who replied on Thursday morning, denying the allegations brought up by Kaiser. Rodriguez branded the report as "patently fake, false, and misleading", saying that his party had never heard of Cambridge Analytica until their data breach scandal. He also accused Rappler of creating a "marketing ploy" to boost support towards the news outlet and stated that Marcos is considering legal options against Rappler for the report.

In July 2020, Kaiser became the campaign manager for the Brock Pierce 2020 presidential campaign.

In an interview with Business Digest Magazine, Kaiser said she wanted people to be able to own their data and receive a dividend or a portion of the multi trillion-dollar industry.

Giving evidence for a House of Commons sub-committee, the information commissioner Elizabeth Denham said that Kaiser refused to be interviewed by them regarding their investigation into Cambridge Analytica/Facebook.

In 2020, Kaiser was the subject of an art installation by Tara Kelton.

In February 2025, Kaiser was a founder of the Open Source AI Foundation (O-SAIF) and co-chairwoman alongside Tyler Lindholm. The group aimed to increase transparency and accountability in artificial intelligence use by government agencies. Travis Oliphant was a director.

== See also ==
- Sophie Zhang
- Christopher Wylie
- Frances Haugen
- Russian interference in the 2016 Brexit referendum
- Timeline of investigations into Trump and Russia (2019)
