= Rebekah Mercer =

American heiress and political donor (born 1973)

- Born: December 6, 1973 (age 52); Yorktown Heights, New York, U.S.
- Education: Cornell University; Stanford University (BS, MS)
- Occupation: Director of Emerdata Limited
- Political party: Republican
- Spouse: Sylvain Mirochnikoff (2003–2018)
- Family: Robert Mercer (father)

Rebekah Mercer (born December 6, 1973) is an American heiress and Republican political donor. The daughter of billionaire Robert Mercer, she is the director of the Mercer Family Foundation.

Mercer began overseeing day-to-day operations of political projects for the Mercer family when the Mercers became involved in conservative causes. Her father said in 2017 that he had sold his stake in the news site Breitbart to his daughters.

In 2018, Mercer funded and co-founded the social networking service Parler. In 2022, she created the RAM Veterans Foundation, a nonprofit organization that reviews and recommends veterans charities for donors through CharitiesForVets.org.

== Early life and education ==
Mercer is the second of three daughters of Diana Lynne (Dean) and billionaire hedge fund manager Robert Mercer. She was raised in Yorktown Heights, New York, a suburb of New York City.

Mercer enrolled at Cornell University and later transferred to Stanford University, where she studied biology and mathematics. In 1999, she earned her master's degree in management science and engineering.

== Career ==
She worked as a Wall Street trader at Renaissance Technologies, the hedge fund her father helped lead. In 2006, Mercer and her sisters purchased Ruby et Violette, a New York City company that sells cookies and brownies online. In 2010, she bought six adjoining apartment units in Donald Trump's 41-story Heritage at Trump Place.

=== Political involvement ===
Mercer first became engaged in conservative politics in 2012 after Mitt Romney's defeat in the 2012 presidential election. She spoke to a group of wealthy conservative donors at the University Club of New York about what the Republican Party had done wrong in canvassing and technology operations during the election.

The following year, in 2013, Mercer helped start Reclaim New York with Steve Bannon. The organization trains citizens to watch their government closely, and uses freedom of information laws to force the New York government to disclose public spending.

In 2014, Mercer joined The Heritage Foundation's board of trustees.

In September 2016, Politico called her "the most powerful woman in GOP politics." She has been more aligned with the anti-establishment part of the Republican Party than most big Republican donors. Newsmax Media owner Christopher Ruddy called her the "First Lady of the Alt-Right".

Mercer supported Mitt Romney in the 2012 Republican Party presidential primaries.

==== 2016 presidential election ====
In 2016, Mercer supported Ted Cruz in the 2016 Republican Party presidential primaries. She led Keep the Promise I, a Super PAC, which was the largest source of financial support in support of Cruz's campaign.

After Donald Trump secured the Republican nomination, however, she and her father switched their support to Trump. Mercer supported Jeff Sessions for U.S. Attorney General and against Mitt Romney, who Trump was considering for U.S. Secretary of State.

Mercer and her father contributed $25 million during the 2016 presidential election.

In June 2016, Mercer created the Defeat Crooked Hillary PAC, and ran the organization's daily operations. The PAC was incorporated with the Federal Election Commission as Make America Number 1 and supported Trump in the general election, including making anti-Hillary Clinton advertisements.

During the 2016 presidential election, Mercer proposed creating a searchable database for Hillary Clinton's e-mails in the public domain and then forwarded this suggestion to several people, including Alexander Nix the CEO of Cambridge Analytica, who e-mailed the request to Julian Assange. Assange denied Nix's request. Mercer worked with Steve Bannon to create the film Clinton Cash. She has consulted extensively with former Democratic strategist and pollster Patrick Caddell on campaigns.

The Mercers stood behind Trump following release of the Access Hollywood tape in late 2016, dismissing Trump's claim of grabbing women's genitals against their will as "locker room braggadocio."

==== Trump administration ====
Mercer directs the Mercer Family Foundation and served on the executive committee of Trump's first presidential transition team.

People close to the transition said she opposed Corey Lewandowski as RNC chair, noting that Lewandowski had reportedly resisted paying for services from Cambridge Analytica, a data firm funded by the Mercers early in the campaign, though a close associate of Mercer's denied the stories. Lewandowski was not, however, supported for the RNC position and did not obtain it. Paul Manafort, Kellyanne Conway's predecessor as campaign director, who was also said to be critical of Cambridge Analytica, had worked for Ted Cruz and was financially backed by the Mercers. Conway reportedly said that, after Trump's inauguration, the expectation was that Mercer would likely lead an outside group, funded by her father, aimed at bolstering Trump's agenda. It was assumed that Cambridge Analytica would also assist the group's efforts.

The Mercers first introduced Steve Bannon to Donald Trump. Mercer helped create the film Clinton Cash with Bannon, a top political adviser to Trump at the time. She has been one of Bannon's main financial contributors.

In late 2017, Bannon told several conservative donors that Mercer had pledged her financial support if he decided to run for president in 2020 against Trump. However, Mercer was frustrated by his comments to the media and disagreed with his public comments in support for Roy Moore, who was under fire for sexual misconduct allegations involving young girls.

In January 2018, a person familiar with conversations between Mercer and Bannon said Mercer would no longer back Bannon financially. Mercer said that she had not spoken to Bannon, the former White House chief strategist in the early months of the Trump administration, in many months but that she continued to support Trump.

==== Breitbart News ====
Mercer and her father, Robert Mercer were key financial benefactors for Breitbart News. Larry Solov, the CEO of Breitbart, said in February 2017 that the Mercers are part-owners of the media outlet. Robert Mercer announced in November 2017 that he had sold his stake in the website to his daughters.

==== Cambridge Analytica ====
Cambridge Analytica was a privately held data mining and data analysis company with financial backing from the Mercers. The Mercers invested in the company after Mitt Romney lost the 2012 presidential election. On May 1, 2018, Cambridge Analytica and its parent company filed for insolvency proceedings and closed operations.

Alexander Tayler, a former director for Cambridge Analytica, was appointed director of Emerdata on March 28, 2018. Rebekah Mercer, Jennifer Mercer, Alexander Nix and Johnson Chun Shun Ko who has links to Erik Prince are in leadership positions at Emerdata.

==== RAM Veterans Foundation ====
In May 2022, Mercer was credited with creating the RAM Veterans Foundation, named in honor of Robert Alexander Mercer who died in France during World War II. RAM Veterans Foundation is an organization that reviews and recommends veterans charities to donors at CharitiesForVets.org.

==== Parler ====
In 2018, Mercer co-founded, and funded, the social media website Parler with John Matze Jr. and Jared Thomson. Mercer described herself in a Parler post as having "started Parler" with Matze. The Parler board, allegedly controlled by Mercer, fired Parler CEO John Matze on January 29, 2021.

As of early February 2021, Mercer holds the majority shares and, The Washington Post reported "increasingly pulls the strings" at Parler, controlling two-thirds of its board, and appointing other directors.

==== American Museum of Natural History ====
Tax records indicate that the Mercer family donated millions of dollars to organizations that reject the scientific consensus regarding climate change.

The Mercer family has contributed $4 million to the American Museum of Natural History, and Rebekah Mercer sat on the museum board of directors from 2013 to 2019.

In 2016, over 250 scientists penned an open letter calling for the museum to "end ties to anti-science propagandists and funders of climate science misinformation, and to have Rebekah Mercer leave the American Museum of Natural History Board of Trustees."

In January 2018, a protest by the group Revolting Lesbians called for Mercer's removal from the board. The protest followed the release of a letter from over 200 academics and scientists calling for the board to "end ties to anti-science propagandists and funders of climate science misinformation."

In March 2018, a group called the "Clean Money Project" mounted a spoof campaign aimed at highlighting Mercer's positions on climate change and pressuring the museum to sever ties with her.

By the end of 2019, Mercer was no longer on the board.

=== Rockbridge Network and 1789 Capital ===
Mercer is a donor to the Rockbridge Network, a conservative political advocacy group. In 2022, Mercer co-founded 1789 Capital alongside fellow Rockbridge Network associates Omeed Malik and Chris Buskirk.

== Personal life ==
As a student at Stanford University, Mercer met Sylvain Mirochnikoff, a native of France. The couple married in 2003. Mercer left her trading job to home school her four children. As of 2016, Mirochnikoff was a managing director at Morgan Stanley. In 2017, the New Yorker reported that Mercer and Mirochnikoff were in the process of divorcing. The couple is divorced as of 2019.
