= Mohawk Valley Health System =

Health system in New York State, United States

Wynn Hospital
- Mohawk Valley Health System
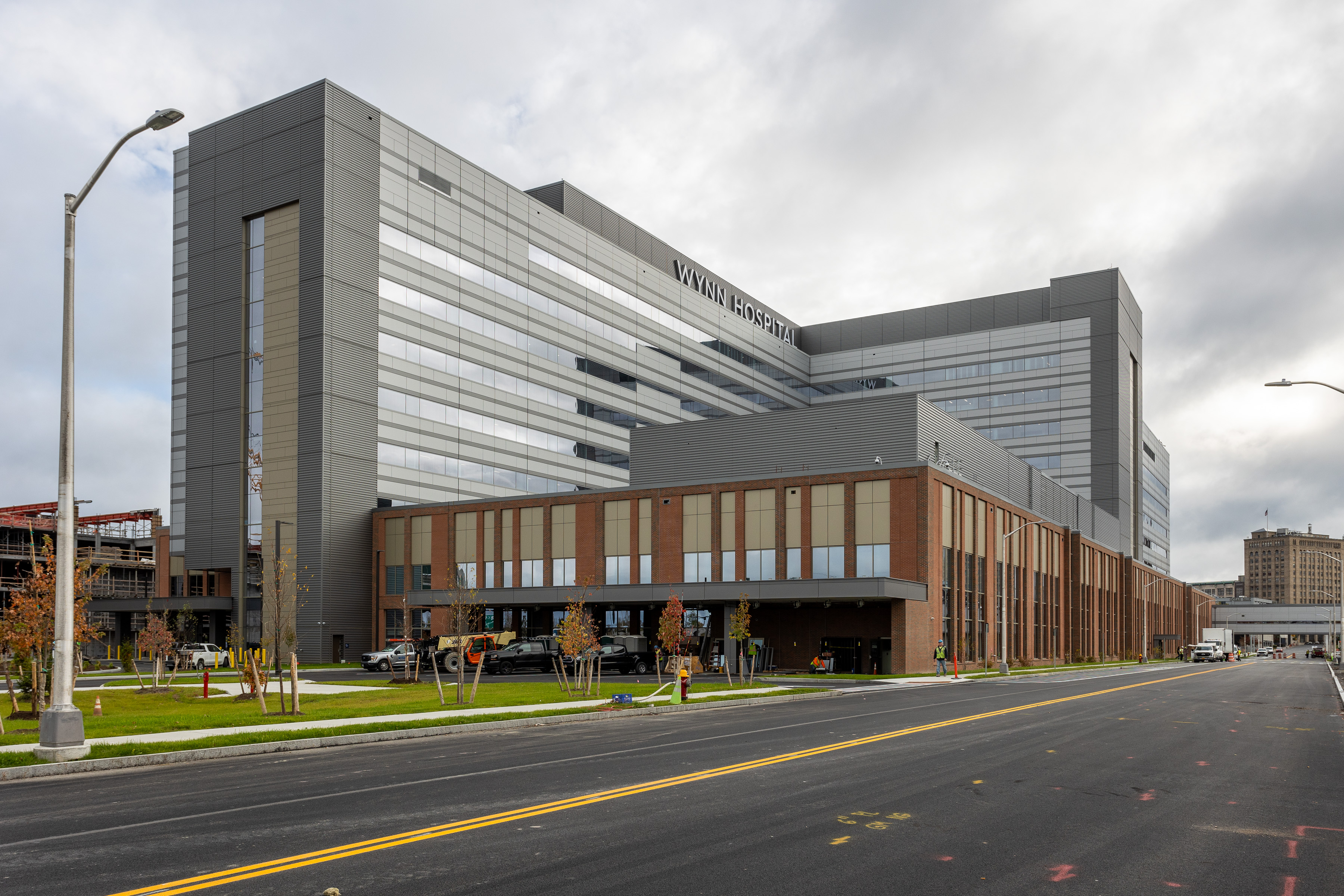

Geography
- Location: 111 Hospital Drive, Utica, New York, United States
- Coordinates: 43.1033425°N 75.2378723°W

Services
- Emergency department: Level III trauma center
- Beds: 373

History
- Opened: 2023

Links
- Website: mvhealthsystem.org/wynn-hospital
- Lists: Hospitals in New York State

Faxton Hospital

Geography
- Location: 1675 Bennett Street, Utica, New York, United States
- Coordinates: 43.091185°N 75.258774°W

Services
- Beds: 0

History
- Opened: 1875

Links
- Website: mvhealthsystem.org/location/faxton-campus
- Lists: Hospitals in New York State

St. Elizabeth's Hospital

Geography
- Location: 2209 Genesee Street, Utica, New York, United States

History
- Opened: 1866
- Closed: 2023

Links
- Lists: Hospitals in New York State

St. Luke's Hospital

Geography
- Location: 1656 Champlin Avenue, Utica, New York, United States

History
- Opened: 1869
- Closed: 2023

Links
- Lists: Hospitals in New York State

Mohawk Valley Health System (MVHS) is a non-profit health system providing services to residents of the Mohawk Valley in Central New York. It was created in 2014 as an affiliation of Faxton St. Luke's Healthcare and St. Elizabeth Medical Center. In October 2023, MVHS moved all acute care beds and emergency services to a new hospital, the Wynn Hospital, in downtown Utica.

MVHS is a designated Children's Miracle Network Hospital.

== Wynn Hospital ==
As early as 2014, the same year MVHS was established, the organization began exploring the potential for a new hospital to replace the three existing campuses. A site was ultimately selected in downtown Utica that would displace 38 businesses, prompting community opposition and a lawsuit, with billionaire Robert Mercer's group Reclaim New York supporting the opposition. The new medical center was designed to be 10 stories and 702,000 sq. ft. More recent plans cite the size as 672,000 sq. ft. Ground was broken in 2019. In March 2021 MVHS announced that the hospital would be named The Wynn Hospital of the Mohawk Valley Health System after Steve Wynn (who was raised in Utica) donated $50 million to the project.

The new hospital opened on October 29, 2023. An issue with an air handling unit on the second floor was discovered shortly before opening: MVHS and the New York State Department of Health determined that the move should continue as planned. 47 trauma patients were diverted to other area hospitals, and elective surgeries were deferred, until the issue was fixed on November 6.

The Wynn Hospital was designated a level III trauma center in February 2024.

Nurses moving from the two closing hospitals to Wynn consolidated their unions under the New York State Nurses Association. As of November 2023, contract negotiations had stalled. The nurses' union held a demonstration outside the hospital; after MVHS threatened to discipline participating nurses, NYSNA filed an unfair labor practice complaint with the National Labor Relations Board. Like in other hospitals in New York State, nurses have filed complaints about understaffing. In June 2024, the CEO of MVHS mentioned that divisions between nurses from the two hospitals were still present.

On May 8, 2024, the New York State Department of Health issued an immediate jeopardy warning for Wynn's open-heart surgery program. MVHS officials cited issues with management of the program and the program's two cardiothoracic surgeons. Open-heart surgeries were diverted to St. Joseph's Hospital Health Center in Syracuse. Some cardiac surgeries other than open-heart surgery resumed on June 20.

Early in June 2024, physician assistants were temporarily barred from performing invasive procedures while MVHS confirmed their credentials. At the end of 2024, the former director of medical staff services filed suit against MVHS, claiming she was terminated and retaliated against for exposing lapses in credentialing.

MVHS closed its Adult Day Health Care program on June 7, 2024, citing staffing challenges and declining patient demand. On the same day, MVHS announced a partnership with VNS Health to operate its senior health program.

On August 1, 2024, MVHS appointed a new Chief Operating Officer, Dr. William W. LeCates. He became Chief Executive Officer on October 20, 2025.

In early January 2025, a surge of patients forced the Wynn hospital to divert emergency patients other than heart attacks, strokes, and trauma to other hospitals. A diversion on January 4 lasted five hours, and another on January 6 lasted three. The MVHS chief medical officer attributed the diversion to seasonal illness, winter accidents, and a large number of stroke patients. A Utica city councillor pointed to inadequate staffing instead, common to other upstate hospitals, and put forward a resolution requesting assistance from the New York National Guard, as they had during the COVID-19 pandemic.

In March 2026, a council of regional emergency medical services providers complained of "persistent and escalating" delays in off-loading patients from ambulances at Wynn. In a letter to the MVHS CEO, they stated that when ambulances were prevented from returning to the field, it had negative effects throughout the region. Hospital leadership acknowledged the issue, and several EMS and local political leaders observed that emergency room backups were common across the state of New York.

== History ==
Faxton Hospital evolved from the union of two facilities: Children's Hospital and Rehabilitation Center, an outgrowth of the Utica Orphan Asylum on Genesee Street established in 1830, and Faxton Hospital, established by Theodore S. Faxton on Sunset Avenue in Utica in 1875. On January 1, 1989, Faxton Hospital and Children's Hospital merged to become Faxton Hospital.

St. Elizabeth's Hospital was founded in West Utica in 1866. Mother M. Bernardina, founder of the Order of St. Francis in Syracuse, was a teacher in Utica and founded the hospital to care for its residents. It was originally located in a small house donated by St. Joseph Church.

St. Luke's-Memorial Hospital Center traces its roots to the original St. Luke's Home established in 1869 and the Utica Homeopathic Hospital established in 1895. The Utica Homeopathic Hospital was later renamed Utica Memorial Hospital. In 1949, the two hospitals merged and in 1957, St. Luke's-Memorial Hospital opened at its current location on the St. Luke's Campus on Champlin Avenue in New Hartford.

On July 23, 1992, the Board of Trustees of St. Luke's-Memorial Hospital unanimously approved an affiliation with Faxton Hospital and the two hospitals formed the Mohawk Valley Network. In 1997, Faxton Hospital and St. Luke's-Memorial combined their governing boards into a common 25-member board to serve both hospitals. In 1998, the hospitals formed a single management and in 1999, the hospitals’ foundations combined. On January 1, 2000 the consolidation was completed by the creation of a single entity, Faxton St. Luke's Healthcare. In 2002, the board of directors approved the consolidation of programs and services.

In December 2011, the Boards of Directors for Faxton St. Luke's Healthcare and St. Elizabeth Medical Center passed a resolution to begin discussions on the feasibility and benefits of merging or undertaking other transactions that would more closely link the two hospitals. The two organizations had already been collaborative, having founded the Mohawk Valley Heart Institute in 1996 and the Regional Cancer Center in 2000. In December 2012, the organizations signed a memorandum of understanding as the official first step toward affiliation. In December 2013, the Attorney General of New York announced a settlement addressing competitive concerns and allowing the affiliation to move forward. On March 6, 2014, Faxton St. Luke's Healthcare and St. Elizabeth Medical Center announced their affiliation under the Mohawk Valley Health System. Adirondack Community Physicians and St. Elizabeth Medical Group merged to become MVHS Medical Group.

In 2019, MVHS formally consolidated their two fundraising foundations after informally operating together since 2016. The Faxton St. Luke's Healthcare Foundation and the St. Elizabeth Medical Center Foundation became the Mohawk Valley Health System Foundation.

== See also ==
- St. Elizabeth College of Nursing
