= Arese Carrington =

- Born: Arese Ukpoma; 1958 (age 67–68)
- Education: Harvard School of Public Health, University of Ibadan
- Occupations: Medical Doctor, Public Health Consultant
- Notable work: Defend the Defenseless
- Spouse: Walter Carrington (married 1995)

Arese Carrington (born Arese Ukpoma in 1958) is a Nigerian-American medical doctor, international public health consultant and human rights activist. She specializes in international public health programming and women's issues.

== Career ==
Carrington graduated from University of Ibadan in 1980. She was a practicing physician in Nigeria for fifteen years during which she worked for a time at the University College Hospital, Ibadan and as the medical advisor for a multi-national company. She subsequently set up her own company, Health and Medical Services (HMS), which provided industrial firms, diplomatic missions and others with advisory services on preventive health care. At a time when preventive healthcare of workers was being overlooked she brought it to the forefront and put policies in place that ensured these needs were met.

A physician by training, Carrington decided to switch from curative to preventive medicine in order to more effectively deal with the public health problems facing the developing world.

In 2000 she received a Masters of Public Health degree from the Harvard School of Public Health, where she specialized in International Public Health. She was elected by her classmates there as a Class Marshal and was selected by Harvard to represent all of its graduate schools as the graduate orator at the university's commencement exercises. Dr. Carrington delivered an oration summoning that year's graduates to make the problems of the developing world a high priority in their lives. Recalling the injunction her father had given her during the Nigerian Civil War she called upon the audience of over 6000 people to “Defend the Defenseless.”

Carrington previously worked as an Associate Director of the Harvard School of Public Health's AIDS Prevention Initiative in Nigeria (APIN). She was responsible for creating the conditions which led to this initiative being funded with a $25 million grant from the Bill and Melinda Gates Foundation to fight HIV/AIDS in Nigeria. This was the first major grant Nigeria had gotten for HIV/AIDS. She was instrumental in persuading the president of Nigeria to endorse the initiative. Her responsibilities included government relations and community AIDS prevention programs.

She has served as a consultant on HIV/AIDS and malaria prevention programs at the federal, state and local government levels in Nigeria. At the Lagos State Ministry of Health she worked with the Permanent Secretary of Health to design and implement AIDS prevention campaigns and to introduce HIV /AIDS education modules into the state's public schools. In addition she helped to set up a safe blood transfusion system as well as anti-malaria programs.

She worked with Nigeria's Ministry of Health through the board of the Pan African Health Foundation (PAHF) on the technical aspect of AIDS prevention by playing a main part in helping the foundation establish Africa's first major auto disable syringe factory in Port Harcourt. This technical breakthrough is helping to fight the AIDS pandemic in Nigeria by ensuring syringes and needles cannot be reused. The factory is a public private partnership.

Carrington is the author of “Malaria in Nigeria” published in the fall 2001 issue of the Harvard Health Policy Review. She authored, The Female imperative in the New Africa, University of Benin, Eminent Person Lecture series 2015.

== Non profit boards and honors ==
Carrington is the president of the board of United Nations Association of Greater Boston (UNA-GB), along with fellow board members Richard Golob (former president of the board), Sean Murphy, Jonathan Lacoste, and Hakan Satiroglu; a trustee advisory board member of Beth Israel Deaconess Medical Center and a Visiting Committee member at Museum of Fine Arts, Boston, Arts of Asia, Oceania and Africa. A descendant of Oba Ovonranwen who ruled the Benin Kingdom in the 19th century, she played a pivotal role in the opening of the MFA's Benin Kingdom Gallery.

Awards and honors she has received include Lifetime Human Rights Award from the City of Newton, State Senate Official Citation from Massachusetts State Senate and House of Representation Official Citation from Massachusetts State House of Representatives for being a lifelong advocate of human rights in the community and around the world.

== Personal life ==
She was married to Walter Carrington until his death in 2020.
