= Defend the Defenseless =

Memoir by Arese Carrington

- Author: Arese Carrington
- Language: English
- Genre: Memoir
- Publisher: Bronzeline & Co.
- Publication date: 2017
- Media type: Print (Paperback)
- Pages: 268
- ISBN: 978-0-9995043-3-8

Defend the Defenseless is a memoir by Arese Carrington. Published in 2017, it takes us into the lived experience of the Nigerian Civil War through the eyes of Arese Carrington as a young girl and then the struggle for democracy during the tyrannical military dictatorship as a young woman. A mantra her father gave her during the Nigerian civil war when their family was torn apart has continued to shape her life choices and belief in social justice. This memoir opens up to the impact of war and how situations we are thrust into shapes us one way or another.

== Plot ==
=== Part one ===
Part One looks at the history of Nigeria and the factors that led to the Civil War. It narrates a childhood experience not in secessionist Biafra but being caught in the middle when the author's home city Benin was captured by Biafran soldiers. Defend the Defenseless provides both an invaluable historical background and a candid account of the author's personal experience of the Biafran war with her family. It tells of the pain of separation and loss, the joy of survival and reunion; and the consequences of the war that still linger on today.

=== Part two ===
Part Two covers a war of a different kind. It is about the battle for democracy under the Third Nigerian Republic. The author was married to the then U.S. Ambassador to Nigeria, Walter C. Carrington, who although a diplomat was a front row participant in the battle against the authoritarian military ruler to ensure Nigeria returned to democracy and that human rights were observed. A native Nigerian and a naturalized American, as the Ambassador's wife, the author found herself increasingly committed as they stood side by side with the Nigerian people. Behind the scene events that have never been revealed; letters and other documents; an epic love story destined to be; all link back to the Biafran war. The author was the first Nigerian selected to be the graduate orator at Harvard University's commencement exercises, in 2000.

=== Part three ===
Part Three highlights the countries and individuals who played a role.
