= St. Elizabeth College of Nursing =

Coordinates: 43.082597°N 75.267752°W

- Motto: Latin: Caritas benigna est (Love is kind)
- Type: Private
- Established: 1904
- President: Kimberly Panko, DNP, RN
- Students: 209
- Location: Utica, New York, NY, US
- Campus: Urban
- Colors: Green and yellow
- Website: secon.edu

The St. Elizabeth College of Nursing (SECON) is a private university located in Utica, New York, United States.

The college was a product of the mission and tradition of St. Elizabeth Medical Center (SEMC); with the closing of SEMC in October 2023, SECON is now a part of the Mohawk Valley Health System. Established in 1904 as a single purpose, associate's degree program, St. Elizabeth College of Nursing offers training to become a registered nurse.

== History ==
The school was registered by the New York State Education Department (NYSED) as St. Elizabeth Hospital School of Nursing, and graduated its first class of seven in 1907.

== Academics ==
The program offers a two-year associate's degree in applied science (AAS) in nursing. St. Elizabeth College of Nursing is accredited by the Middle States Commission on Higher Education, fully accredited by The Accreditation Commission for Education in Nursing (ACEN), and registered by The University of the State of New York State Education Department.

In 2008, St. Elizabeth College of Nursing partnered with SUNY Polytechnic Institute and created a dual degree partnership. The 1+2+1 program designed for students who have shown excellent academic achievement and can meet admission requirements for the program. During the freshman year, the general education and science requirements are completed at SUNY Poly. In years two and three, the student earn an associate degree while completing the nursing program at SECON leading to RN license. The fourth and final year of the program returns the student to SUNY Poly, where a BSN degree is earned.
