= Robert Mercer =

American computer scientist, businessman and funder of right-wing causes

- Born: Robert Leroy Mercer; July 11, 1946 (age 80); San Jose, California, U.S.
- Education: University of New Mexico, Albuquerque (BS); University of Illinois, Urbana-Champaign (MS, PhD)
- Spouse: Diana Dean
- Children: Rebekah, Jennifer, and Heather Sue

Robert Leroy Mercer (born July 11, 1946) is an American hedge fund manager, computer scientist, and political donor. Mercer was an early artificial intelligence researcher and developer and is the former co-CEO of the hedge fund company Renaissance Technologies.

Mercer played a controversial role in the campaign for the United Kingdom to leave the European Union, led by Dominic Cummings, with £3.9 million being spent on his data analytics and machine learning company AggregateIQ. He has also been a major funder of organizations supporting right-wing political causes in the United States, such as Breitbart News, the now-defunct Cambridge Analytica, and Donald Trump's 2016 campaign for president. He is the principal benefactor of the Make America Number 1 super PAC.

In November 2017, Mercer announced he would step down from Renaissance Technologies and sell his stake in Breitbart News to his daughters. He was the majority owner of SCL Group, a self-described "global elections management agency", before it was dissolved in 2018. In 2021, Mercer was involved in possibly the largest tax settlement in U.S. history, as he, James Simons, and other executives at the hedge fund Renaissance Technologies were ordered to pay as much as $7 billion to the IRS in back taxes.

== Early life and education ==
Mercer grew up in New Mexico. He developed an early interest in computers and in 1964 attended a National Youth Science Camp in West Virginia where he learned to program a donated IBM computer. He went on to get a bachelor's degree in physics and mathematics from the University of New Mexico. While working on his degree, he had a job at the Air Force Weapons Laboratory at Kirtland Air Force Base writing programs where, though he felt he produced good work, he felt it was not optimized. He later said the experience left him with a "jaundiced view" of government-funded research. He earned a Ph.D. in computer science from the University of Illinois at Urbana–Champaign in 1972.

== Career ==
Mercer joined IBM Research in the fall of 1972 and worked at the Thomas J. Watson Research Center in Yorktown, New York, where he helped develop Brown clustering, a statistical machine translation technique, as part of a speech recognition and translation research program led by Frederick Jelinek and Lalit Bahl. He also worked on IBM alignment models. In June 2014, Mercer received the Association for Computational Linguistics Lifetime Achievement Award for this work.

In 1993, Mercer joined hedge fund Renaissance Technologies after being recruited by executive Nick Patterson. The founder of Renaissance, James Harris Simons, a mathematician, preferred to hire mathematicians, computer scientists, and physicists rather than business school students or financial analysts. Mercer and a former colleague from IBM, Peter Brown, became co-CEOs of Renaissance when Simons retired in 2009. Renaissance's main fund, Medallion, earned 39% per year on average from 1989 to 2006.

In 2014, a bipartisan Senate panel estimated that Medallion investors underpaid their taxes by some $6.8 billion over more than a decade, by masking short-term gains as long-term returns. In 2014, Renaissance managed $25 billion in assets. In November 2017, Mercer announced that he would be stepping down from his position at Renaissance Technologies. The decision was taken after the hedge fund faced a backlash over Mercer's political activism.

Mercer appears in the Paradise Papers as a director of eight Bermuda companies, some of which appear to have been used to legally avoid US taxes.

== Political activities and views ==
In 2015, The Washington Post called Mercer one of the ten most influential billionaires in politics. Since 2006, Mercer has donated about $34.9 million to Republican political campaigns in the US.

Mercer has given $750,000 to the Club for Growth, $2 million to American Crossroads, and $2.5 million to Freedom Partners Action Fund. In 2010, he financially supported fringe biochemist Art Robinson's unsuccessful efforts to unseat Peter DeFazio in Oregon's 4th congressional district. In the 2013-2014 election cycle, Mercer donated the fourth largest amount of money among individual donors and the second most among Republican donors.

Mercer joined the Koch brothers’ conservative political donor network after the 2010 Citizens United v. FEC, but Mercer and his daughter, Rebekah Mercer, decided to establish their own political foundation. The Mercer Family Foundation, run by Rebekah, has donated to a variety of conservative causes.

Mercer has donated to The Heritage Foundation, the Cato Institute, the Media Research Center, Reclaim New York, GAI, and Citizens for Self-Governance. In 2013, Mercer was shown data by former Jimmy Carter pollster Patrick Caddell, who has been critical of top Democrats, and commissioned more research from Caddell that showed "voters were becoming alienated from both political parties and mainstream candidates".

Mercer was the main financial backer of the Jackson Hole Summit, a "shadow" conference (not to be confused with a similarly named Federal Reserve conference) that took place in Wyoming in August 2015 to advocate for the gold standard. He has also supported Doctors for Disaster Preparedness, Fred Kelly Grant (an Idaho activist who encourages legal challenges to environmental laws), a campaign for the death penalty in Nebraska, and funded ads in New York critical of the so-called "ground-zero mosque".

According to associates interviewed by Bloomberg, Mercer is concerned with the monetary and banking systems of the United States, which he believes are in danger from government meddling. Mercer is a major source of funding for Breitbart News. He gave at least $10 million to the media outlet, according to Newsweek.

In 2015 Mercer also gave $400,000 to Black Americans for a Better Future, a conservative think tank led by Raynard Jackson. Since 2017 Mercer has donated $87,100 to the same Super PAC.

=== Brexit ===
Mercer was an activist in the campaign for the United Kingdom to end its membership of the European Union, also known as Brexit. Andy Wigmore, communications director of Leave.EU, said that Mercer donated the services of data analytics firm Cambridge Analytica to Nigel Farage, the head of the United Kingdom Independence Party (UKIP). The firm was able to advise Leave.EU through its ability to harvest data from people's Facebook profiles in order to target them with individualized persuasive messages to vote for Brexit.

It has been reported that Cambridge Analytica has undisclosed links to Canadian digital firm AggregateIQ, which also played a pivotal role in Dominic Cummings' Vote Leave campaign, where he delivered an estimated one billion individually curated targeted adverts to voters in the lead up to the Brexit referendum, in contravention of established voting rules. Neither Vote Leave nor Leave.EU informed the UK electoral commission of the donation despite the fact that a law demands that all donations valued over £7,500 must be reported. In 2018, the (UK) Electoral Commission found the Vote Leave campaign guilty of breaking electoral law.

=== 2016 U.S. election ===
Mercer was one of the biggest donors in the 2016 U.S. elections, donating $22.5 million to Republican candidates and PACs. Mercer was a major financial supporter of the 2016 presidential campaign of Ted Cruz, contributing $11 million to a super PAC associated with the candidate. Mercer was a major supporter of Donald Trump's 2016 campaign for president.

Mercer and his daughter Rebekah helped to obtain senior roles in the Trump campaign for Steve Bannon and Kellyanne Conway. Rebekah worked with Conway on the Cruz Super-PAC Keep the Promise in the 2016 Republican primaries. Mercer also financed a Super PAC, Make America Number One, which supported Trump's campaign. Nick Patterson, a former colleague of Mercer's said in 2017 that Trump would not have been elected without Mercer's support.

=== JD Vance ===
Mercer's family donated an undisclosed amount to the super PAC Protect Ohio Values which was established to support JD Vance for his 2022 election to a Senate seat in Ohio. After Mercer support for Parler beginning in 2018, Vance, who founded Narya Capital, allegedly provided advice concerning Parler to Mercer's daughter Bekah. (Note: After Vance graduated from law school in 2013, Peter Thiel had employed Vance at Thiel’s venture capital firm Mithril Capital Management LLC and, later, Thiel, Scott Dorsey who was a co-founder of ExactTarget, Google's Eric Schmidt, and the tech entrepreneur Marc Andreessen financially backed with large sums Vance’s Narya Capital which was co-founded by Colin Greenspon and was established on June 19, 2019, in Columbus with headquarters in Cincinnati as part of Vance's campaign to counter "woke capital" but apparently was shut down in April of 2021 by Delaware regulators only one month after Narya Capital's registered agent "Cogency Global" had resigned. As of June 2024, Narya Capital has investments in at least 19 ventures including investments with a real estate assessment software company ValueBase; a farmland-focused real estate investing company AcreTrader; the Longboat Key-based high-growth neutral video platform Rumble through Ethan Fallang who is a partner with Narya Capital Management, LLC, and oversees its audits, accounting and taxes; insurtech Branch; and the aerospace startup True Anomaly with Jonathan Lacoste of "Space.VC".) (Note: Peter Thiel financially supported JD Vance with a $10 million donation in March 2021 to the super PAC Protect Ohio Values in Vance's 2022 campaign against Tim Ryan for the United States Senate seat from Ohio. Later, on July 15, 2024, during the first day of the 2024 Republican National Convention, former President Donald Trump announced that J.D Vance will be Donald Trump's 2024 running mate for President of the United States.)

=== Race relations ===
Mercer has said that the Civil Rights Act of 1964, the landmark federal statute arising from the civil rights movement of the 1960s, was a major mistake. In 2017, David Magerman, a former Renaissance employee, alleged in a lawsuit that Mercer had said that African Americans were economically better off before the civil rights movement, that white racists no longer existed in the United States, and that the only racists remaining were black racists.

== In popular culture ==
Mercer was portrayed by actor Aden Gillett in the 2019 HBO and Channel 4 produced drama entitled Brexit: The Uncivil War.

== Personal life ==
Mercer and his wife Diana Lynne Dean have three daughters: Jennifer ("Jenji"), Rebekah ("Bekah"), and Heather Sue. Rebekah runs the Mercer Family Foundation. The three Mercer daughters formerly owned a bakery called Ruby et Violette.

Mercer plays competitive poker and owns an HO scale model railroad. In 2009, Mercer filed suit against RailDreams Custom Model Railroad Design, alleging that RailDreams overcharged him by $2 million.

Mercer lives at "Owl's Nest" mansion in Head of the Harbor, New York. He has commissioned a series of yachts, all named Sea Owl. The most recent one is 203 feet (62 metres) in length, and has a pirate-themed playroom for Mercer's grandchildren and a chandelier of Venetian glass.

In Florida, Mercer built a large stable and horse riding center. He has acquired one of the country's largest collections of machine guns and historical firearms, including a weapon Arnold Schwarzenegger wielded in The Terminator.

In 2013, Mercer was sued by several members of his household staff, who accused him of docking their wages and failing to pay overtime compensation. The lawsuit was settled, according to a lawyer who represented the staff members.

Mercer's net worth is estimated to be hundreds of millions of dollars, and he is often referred to as a billionaire.

== Notes ==
Awards
Preceded by Jerry Hobbs	ACL Lifetime Achievement Award; 2014	Succeeded by Li Sheng
