= Alex Marlow =

American journalist, editor, political commentator

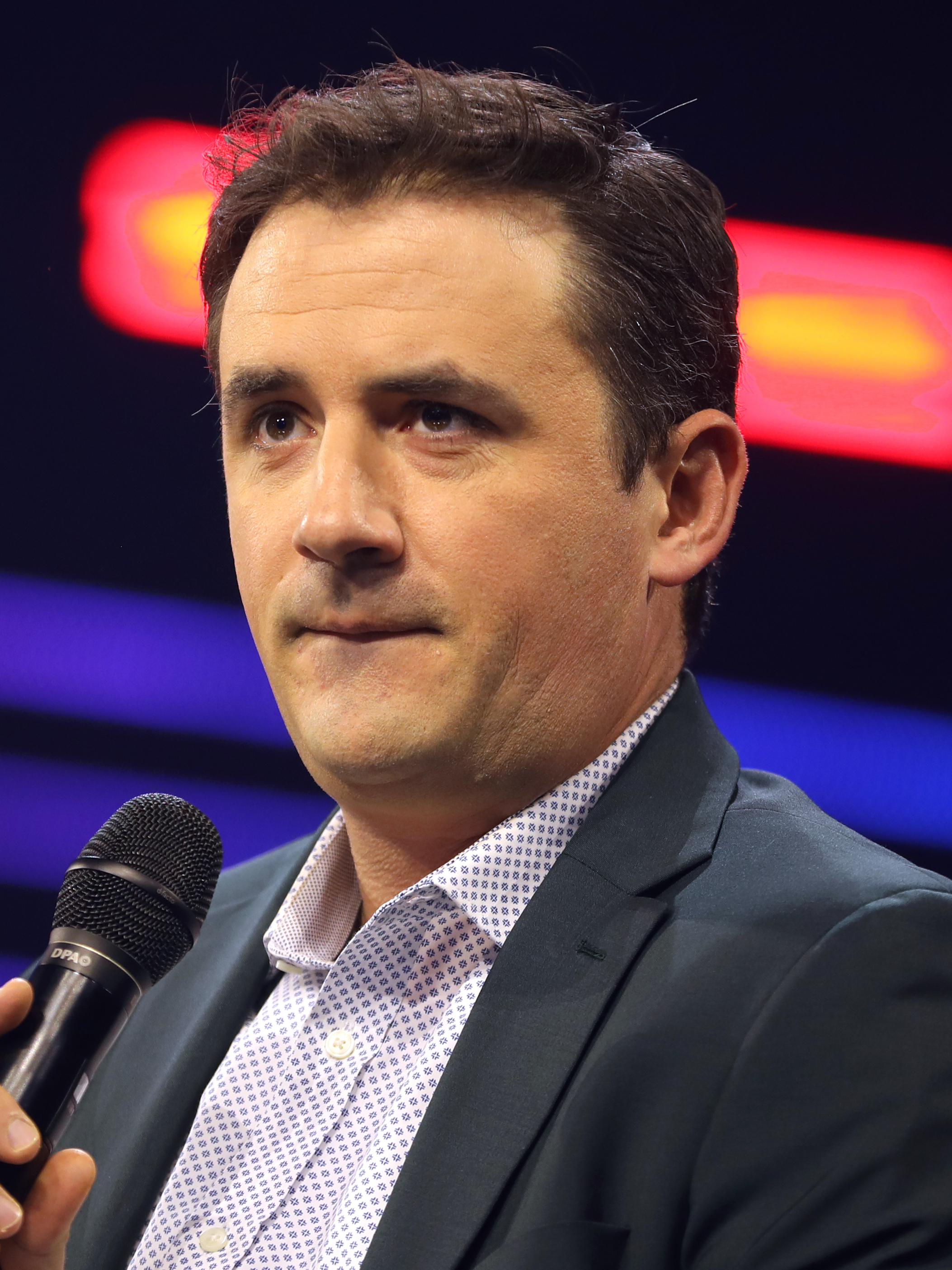
- Marlow in 2023
- Born: Alexander Mason Marlow; January 24, 1986 (age 40); Los Angeles, California, U.S.
- Other name: Alexander Marlow
- Education: Harvard-Westlake School
- Alma mater: University of California, Berkeley
- Occupations: journalist, Editor-in-chief, radio personality, talk show host, political commentator
- Years active: 2008-
- Employer: Breitbart News
- Website: alexmarlow.com

Alexander Mason Marlow (born January 24, 1986) is an American media executive who is the editor-in-chief of Breitbart News and an author. Marlow began his career as Andrew Breitbart's editorial assistant, a position he held for four years. He was hired in 2008 as Breitbart's inaugural managing editor and served as its first employee. Marlow is the former host of Breitbart News Daily on SiriusXM.

Marlow was named to the Forbes 30 Under 30 list for 2015.

== Early life ==
Marlow was born January 24, 1986. His father is Catholic and his mother is Jewish. For high school, he attended Harvard-Westlake School. While a student there, he befriended Andrew Breitbart, who hired him as the first employee at Breitbart News to do odd jobs and minor copy editing. He says that at the time his job was mostly being a "glorified personal assistant" to Breitbart, which subsequently developed into an editorial position as the site became more successful.

== Editor of Breitbart ==
As editor-in-chief of Breitbart, Marlow has indicated the key narratives for the website include immigration, the Islamic State, race riots, traditional values, and Hillary Clinton. Marlow has stated Breitbart is not intended to influence, but to report and highlight stories that conservatives consider important, particularly those involving trade, spending, and immigration.

It has been reported that some former Breitbart employees believe Marlow privately harbors misgivings with the site's direction, with one suggesting Marlow was the "good cop to the bad cop played by Steve Bannon."

The PBS program FRONTLINE interviewed Marlow in 2019.

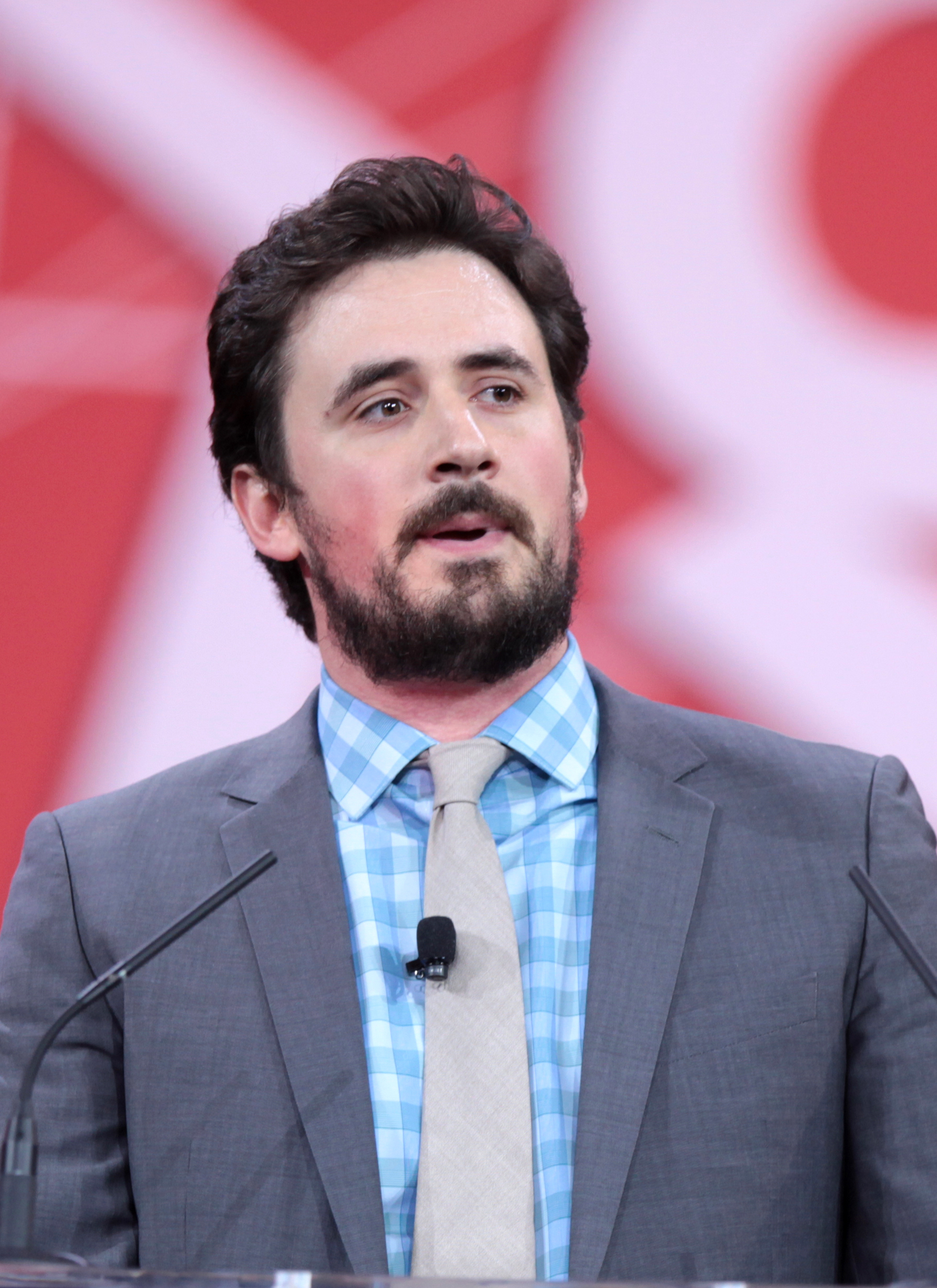
Speaking at CPAC in 2015

Marlow has denied that Breitbart is a "hate-site", insisting "[t]here's no racism; there's no bigotry. It's about values; it's about fairness." He has also denied allegations of antisemitism, telling NBC News "that we're consistently called anti-Semitic despite the fact that we are overwhelmingly staffed with Jews and are pro-Israel and pro-Jewish. That is fake news."

== Radio ==
Marlow co-hosted the debut of Breitbart News Daily on SiriusXM's Patriot channel starting October 27, 2015, alongside Breitbart Executive Chairman Steve Bannon. The show featured interviews with conservative figures, analysis of current events, and critiques of mainstream media narratives. Marlow transitioned to primary host, maintaining the format until announcing the end of his tenure on June 21, 2023.

Marlow then launched The Alex Marlow Show with the Salem Podcast Network, debuting on November 6, 2024. The daily program is distributed across multiple platforms, including Spotify, Apple Podcasts, Rumble, and YouTube, reaching listeners via on-demand audio and video formats.

In December 2025 Marlow was tapped by Salem Radio Network to host the noon hour of the late Charlie Kirk's national midday radio show (with CNN commentator Scott Jennings to host the 1-3 pm time slot).

== Books ==
- Marlow, Alex (May 18, 2021). Breaking the News: Exposing the Establishment Media's Hidden Deals and Secret Corruption. New York, New York: Threshold Editions. ISBN 978-1982160746.
- Marlow, Alex (October 3, 2023). Breaking Biden: Exposing the Hidden Forces and Secret Money Machine Behind Joe Biden, His Family, and His Administration. New York, New York: Threshold Editions. ISBN 978-1668023006.
- Marlow, Alex (August 5, 2025). Breaking the Law: Exposing the Weaponization of America’s Legal System Against Donald Trump. New York, New York: Threshold Editions. ISBN 978-1668088784.

In 2025, Fox News host Gregg Jarrett accused publisher Simon & Schuster of stealing the book idea that he had proposed and about which he had consulted with the publisher, and giving it to Marlow instead.

== Personal ==
Christina Federico and Alexander Marlow were married in Los Angeles on October 13, 2012.
