= Reclaim New York =

Government watchdog group in NY

- Reclaim New York Logo
- Founded: 2013
- Founders: Robert Mercer, Rebekah Mercer, Steven Bannon
- Location: New York City
- Board of directors: Jacqui James Varga, Rebekah Mercer, Jennifer Mercer, Leonard Leo
- Website: https://reclaimnewyork.com/

Reclaim New York is a government watchdog group in New York State. It was founded in 2013 by hedge fund manager and computer scientist Robert Mercer, his daughter Rebekah Mercer, and Breitbart co-founder Steve Bannon, to track what they saw as excessive public spending. They were soon joined by conservative lawyer and legal activist Leonard Leo, and Bush-administration veteran Tom Basile. Reclaim New York describes itself as a non-partisan good government group. Most leadership roles have been filled by individuals with connections to the Republican party or other conservative groups. It has been accused by state Democrats and liberal groups of being a vehicle for the Mercers to achieve their political goals. As per its tax filings, Mercer provides nearly all of Reclaim New York's funding. It shared office space in New York City with data-mining firm Cambridge Analytica, which also received investments from the Mercer family. Reclaim New York, a 501(c)(3), launched a lobbying arm in 2016, the 501(c)(4) Reclaim New York Initiative. Reclaim New York downsized its operations in 2019, which was attributed by its opponents to its lack of success in influencing state politics.

Reclaim New York used a strategy of filing Freedom of Information Law (FOIL) requests for information about government spending, in order to publicize the difficulty of obtaining public documents and uncover spending it felt to be wasteful, abusive, or fraudulent. It makes these requests itself and trains citizens to make their own requests. Victor Feldman, writing in the Berkshire Edge, criticized RNYI for sowing distrust of the government and abusing the open-records civic process by intimidation. In 2014, it filed 250 requests with various government groups in Long Island, and more in the rest of the state. It sued at least 11 government groups including the Elmont School District and Peekskill City School District for failing to comply with their requests. In its suit against a village in Rockland County, the village asked that it not be required to pay Reclaim New York's legal fees, citing its wealthy donors compared to the village budget. The judge agreed what the village called the "Mercer Mercy Rule".

Reclaim New York has sponsored other initiatives in the state. It opposed various bills in the state legislature and the renaming of the Tappan Zee Bridge after Governor Mario Cuomo. On Long Island, it has criticized a wind power initiative in East Hampton and tax rates on Long Island. It was also part of the unsuccessful effort to stop a new hospital from being built in Utica.

As of 2024, Reclaim New York's board of directors includes:

- Jacqui James Varga: Chairman
- Rebekah Mercer: Director and Treasurer
- Jennifer Mercer: Secretary and Director
- Leonard Leo: Director
