= Make America Number 1 =

Republican super PAC launched for 2016 campaigns

Make America Number 1 is a right-wing super PAC (political action committee) that supported the presidential campaigns of Ted Cruz and Donald Trump in the 2016 United States presidential election. During the primary campaign, the super PAC was known as Keep the Promise I. In the general election, it informally termed itself Defeat Crooked Hillary PAC, but was not allowed to officially use this term and chose the name Make America Number 1. The PAC is run by Rebekah Mercer, the second daughter of its largest donor Robert Mercer.

Robert Mercer donated $15.5 million to the PAC during the 2016 campaign; philanthropist Bernard Marcus donated $2 million; and Cherna Moskowitz donated $1 million. As of November 2, it had received a total of $19,586,131 in donations. Robert Mercer is the fourth-largest contributor to Super PACs in the 2016 cycle.

Rebekah Mercer has been chair of the PAC since 2015. Its operations were headed by Kellyanne Conway from August 2015 until she was tapped to serve as the Campaign Manager of the Donald Trump campaign in mid-August 2016. The PAC also employed Stephen Bannon, who joined the campaign as CEO. After Conway's departure, David Bossie took leadership. He left in September to become Trump's Deputy Campaign Manager, and Rebekah Mercer took over leadership of day-to-day operations.

During the general election the PAC ran anti-Hillary Clinton ads in a $350,000 campaign in Ohio and Pennsylvania.

Make America Number 1 responded to the public release of Donald Trump's conversation with Billy Bush about his treatment of women by stating, "We are completely indifferent to Mr. Trump's locker room braggadocio."

== See also ==
- Make America Great Again
