= Walter C. Carrington =

American diplomat (1930–2020)

Walter Carrington
- Born: July 24, 1930; New York City, New York, U.S.
- Died: August 11, 2020 (aged 90)
- Education: Harvard Law School
- Occupation: Diplomat
- Political party: Democratic
- Spouse: Arese Carrington

Walter C. Carrington (July 24, 1930 – August 11, 2020) was an American diplomat who served as the United States ambassador extraordinary and plenipotentiary to Senegal and Nigeria.

Carrington served as the U.S. ambassador to Senegal from 1980 to 1981. He was appointed by U.S. president Bill Clinton in 1993 as the U.S. ambassador to Nigeria, where he remained until 1997. His ties to Nigeria were deep; he had married into a Nigerian family and had lived in three Nigerian cities since the late 1960s.

== Career ==
Carrington graduated from the Harvard Law School (AB 1952; JD 1955). Upon graduation from Harvard, he enlisted in the U.S. Army, where one of his assignments was as an enlisted man with the Judge Advocate General Corps (Germany, 1955–57). Upon separation from the military, he entered a private law practice in Boston, Massachusetts; during that time, he also served as commissioner of the Massachusetts Commission Against Discrimination, the youngest person to serve until that date. He held various positions in the Peace Corps from 1961 to 1971, serving as country director in Sierra Leone, Senegal, and Tunisia and then as regional director for Africa (1969–71). From 1971 to 1980, he was executive vice president of the African-American Institute.

Carrington served as the United States ambassador to the Republic of Senegal from 1980 to 1981. In 1981, he was named director of the Department of International Affairs of Howard University. He published several articles on Africa. He served as U.S. ambassador to Nigeria from 1993 to 1997. On September 1, 2004, Carrington was named the Warburg Professor of International Relations at Simmons College in Boston.

Carrington was a member of Alpha Phi Alpha fraternity. In 1997, he received an honorary doctorate (Doctor of Humane Letters) from Livingstone College, North Carolina.

In 1991, Carrington published Africa in the Minds and Deeds of Black American Leaders (with Edwin Dorn). In 2010, he published A Duty to Speak: Refusing to Remain Silent in a Time of Tyranny, a compilation of his speeches supporting democracy and human rights in Nigeria during the Sani Abacha military dictatorship. He also wrote many Africa-related articles for national magazines.

Diplomatic posts
Preceded by Herman Jay Cohen	U.S. ambassador to Senegal; 1980–1981	Succeeded by Charles William Bray
Preceded by William L. Swing	U.S. ambassador to Nigeria; 1993–1997	Succeeded by William H. Twaddell
