= Breitbart News =

American news and opinion website

Breitbart News Network

- Screenshot
- Website type: Politics; News and opinion
- Available in: English
- Owners: Breitbart News Network, LLC
- Creator: Andrew Breitbart
- Editors: Alex Marlow (editor-in-chief); Wynton Hall (managing editor)
- CEO: Larry Solov
- Website: breitbart.com/masthead
- Commercial: Yes
- Registration: Optional (required to comment)
- Launched: 2007; 19 years ago (as Breitbart.tv)
- Current status: Active

Breitbart News Network (/ˈbraɪtbɑːrt/ BRYTE-bart; known commonly as Breitbart News, Breitbart, or Breitbart.com) is an American far-right news, opinion, and commentary website founded in 2007 by American conservative commentator Andrew Breitbart. Its content has been described as misogynistic, xenophobic, and racist by various academics and journalists. (Note: Multiple sources: Higdon, Nolan (2020). The Anatomy of Fake News: A Critical News Literacy Education. University of California Press. pp. 105–109. ISBN 978-0-520-34787-8 – via Google Books. "Breitbart relied on fear-inspiring racist and xenophobic narratives that had salience with whites who were reacting to the economic anxiety over the Great Recession with racial resentment over the election of the first self-identified black president and the increase in the proportion of the US population made up of racial minorities. [...] The election of President Barack Obama saw Breitbart continue the long-standing American practice of spreading racist-laden fake news stories. For example, Breitbart stories claimed that Obama was born in Kenya and supported terrorist organizations. Breitbart's fake news stories were not only racist but xenophobic and Islamophobic"; DiMaggio, Anthony R. (December 30, 2021). "The Trojan Horse "Conservative" Media and the Mainstreaming of Neofascistic Politics". Rising Fascism in America: It Can Happen Here. Routledge. pp. 93–97. doi:10.4324/9781003198390-3 (inactive June 1, 2026). ISBN 978-1-000-52308-9. S2CID 244786335 – via Google Books. "But an analysis of Breitbart's content demonstrates the venue's commitment to normalizing neofascistic ideology, even as it refuses to acknowledge what it is doing. As Rolling Stone identified when it ran a November 2016 profile piece, Breitbart has a troubling history of promoting misogyny, Islamophobia, homophobia, and racism. [...] Concerning black-white relations in the United states, Breitbart also has an eliminationist-style rhetoric that depicts protests of racial inequality and police brutality as a fundamental threat to the nation."; Bhat, Prashanth; Vasudevan, Krishnan (May 20, 2019). "National Review: Opposing "Trumpbart"". In Atkinson, Joshua D.; Kenix, Linda (eds.). Alternative Media Meets Mainstream Politics: Activist Nation Rising. Rowman & Littlefield. pp. 56–57. ISBN 978-1-4985-8435-7 – via Google Books. "Third, writers at National Review took a moral high ground and accused Breitbart and Donald Trump of enthusing extremist groups associated with the alt-right, which the publication claimed were known for their misogyny, sexism, racism, and xenophobia. [...] By calling Breitbart "the homepage for peckerwood-trash racists and the white-power basement dwellers," National Review accused the far-right media outlet of paving the way for white supremacists to enter the mainstream."; Andersen, Robin (September 29, 2017). "Weaponizing Social Media: "The Alt-Right," the Election of Donald J. Trump, and the Rise of Ethno-Nationalism in the United States". In Andersen, Robin; de Silva, Purnaka L. (eds.). The Routledge Companion To Media and Humanitarian Action. Routledge. pp. 487–500. doi:10.4324/9781315538129-49 (inactive June 1, 2026). ISBN 9781315538129. "A key to Breitbart's success has long been the fake news modules, misinformation and propagandized narratives that form the content core of the Breitbart News website. Breitbart has carefully honed an anti-immigration, anti-Muslim online presence in a media universe complete with stories that raise fears of "white genocide"."; Bhat, Prashanth (December 10, 2019). "Advertisements in the Age of Hyper-Partisan Media: Breitbart's #DumpKelloggs Campaign". In Gutsche, Robert E. Jr. (ed.). The Trump Presidency, Journalism, and Democracy (PDF). Routledge. pp. 192–205. ISBN 9780367891527 – via Open Research Library. "By March 2017, they have collectively purchased less than 0.5 percent of Breitbart's inventory. These agencies have listed Breitbart to their list of brand-unsafe websites because the far-right site violated their hate speech policies (Benes, 2017). [...] In the case of Breitbart, brands such as Kellogg's withdrew ads because they didn't want to be associated with a media outlet that produces racist and xenophobic content."; Victor, Daniel; Stack, Liam (November 14, 2016). "Stephen Bannon and Breitbart News, in Their Words". The New York Times. ISSN 0362-4331. "Critics, including some conservatives formerly associated with it, have denounced Breitbart in its current incarnation as a hate site steeped in misogyny, homophobia, transphobia, white nationalism and anti-Semitism."; Grynbaum, Michael M.; Herrman, John (August 26, 2016). "Breitbart Rises From Outlier to Potent Voice in Campaign". The New York Times.) The site has published a number of conspiracy theories and intentionally misleading stories, as well as having promoted climate change denial and COVID-19 misinformation. Posts originating from the Breitbart News Facebook page are among the most widely shared political content on Facebook.

Initially conceived as "the Huffington Post of the right", Breitbart News later aligned with the alt-right, the European populist right, and the pan-European nationalist identitarian movement under the management of former executive chairman Steve Bannon, who declared the website "the platform for the alt-right" in 2016. Breitbart News became a virtual rallying spot for supporters of Donald Trump's 2016 presidential campaign. The company's management, together with former staff member Milo Yiannopoulos, solicited ideas for stories from, and worked to advance and market ideas of neo-Nazi and white supremacist groups and individuals. After the election, more than 2,000 organizations removed Breitbart News from ad buys following Internet activism campaigns denouncing the site's controversial positions. Breitbart's monthly visitors continually declined after Trump's election, from 17.3 million monthly readers at the beginning of 2017 to 4.6 million in May 2019 and to around 700,000 monthly readers in 2024.

The company is headquartered in Los Angeles, with bureaus in Texas, London, and Jerusalem. Co-founder Larry Solov is the co-owner (along with Andrew Breitbart's widow Susie Breitbart and the Mercer family) and CEO. Alex Marlow is the editor-in-chief, Wynton Hall is managing editor, and Peter Schweizer is senior editor-at-large.

== History ==
=== 2005–2012: creation and early years ===
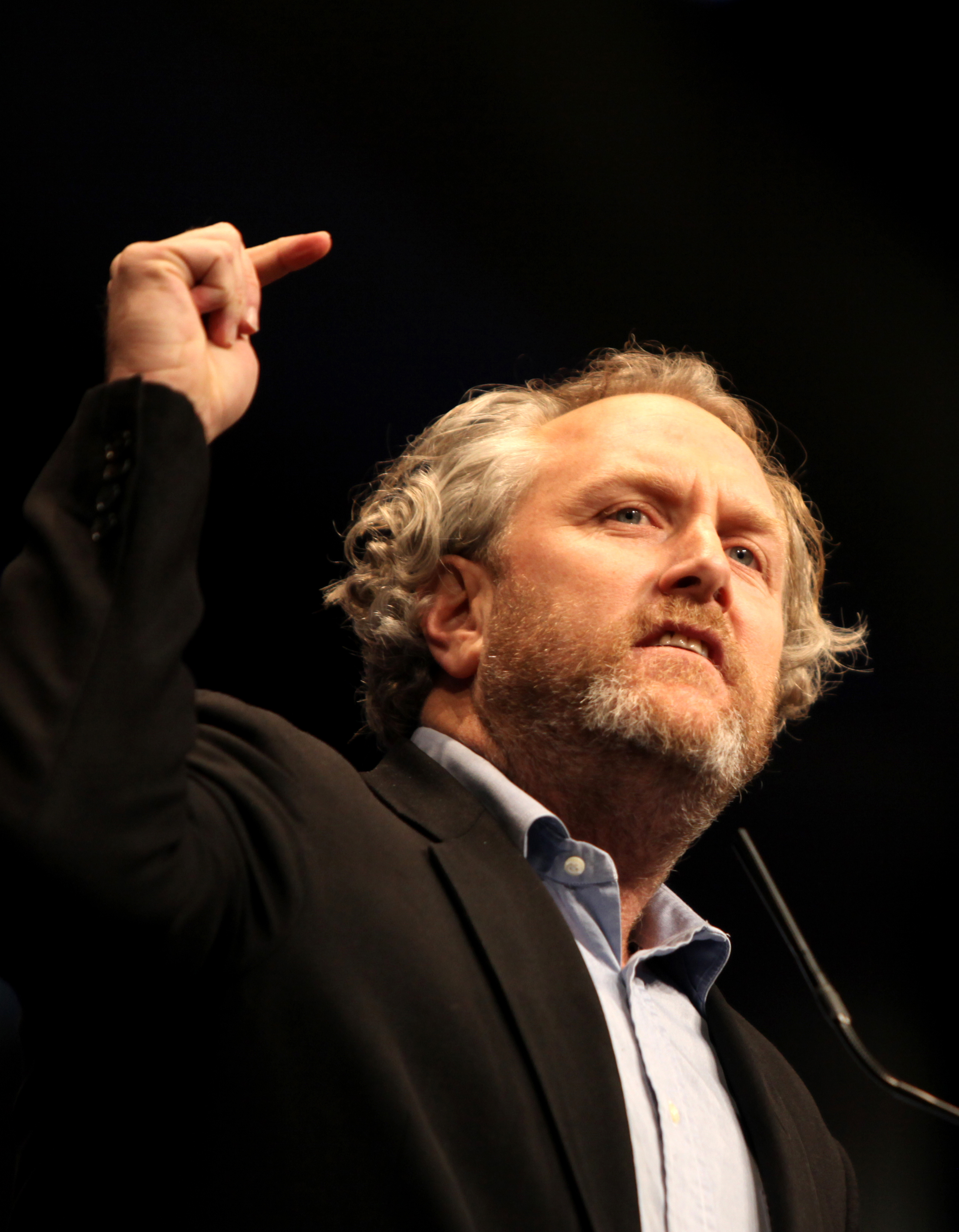
Andrew Breitbart in 2012

Andrew Breitbart launched Breitbart.com as a news aggregator in 2005. The website featured direct links to wire stories at the Associated Press, Reuters, Fox News, the New York Post, TMZ as well as a number of other outlets. The website's initial growth was largely fueled by links from the Drudge Report. In 2007, Breitbart.com launched a video blog, Breitbart.tv.

According to co-founder Larry Solov, the two men were in agreement that the site should be "unapologetically pro-freedom and pro-Israel" during their visit to Israel in 2007. In August 2010, Andrew Breitbart told the Associated Press that he was "committed to the destruction of the old media guard." As part of that commitment, he founded Breitbart.com, a website designed to become "the Huffington Post of the right" according to Breitbart News's former executive chairman, Steve Bannon. Breitbart News exclusively re-posted the Anthony Weiner sexting scandal, the resignation of Shirley Sherrod, and the ACORN 2009 undercover videos controversy.

Billionaire conservative activist Robert Mercer endowed Breitbart.com with at least $11 million in 2011.

=== 2012–2016: after Andrew Breitbart's death ===
==== Bannon assumes leadership ====
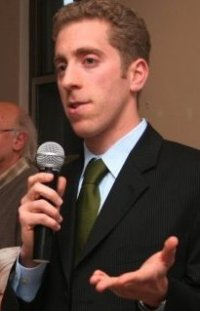
Joel Pollak, the senior editor-at-large of Breitbart News from 2012 to 2025

Andrew Breitbart died in March 2012. The website hosted a number of memorials for him. Editors said they intended to carry on his legacy at the website. Following Andrew Breitbart's death, former board member Steve Bannon became executive chairman and Laurence Solov became CEO. The company also hired Joel Pollak as editor-in-chief and Alex Marlow as managing editor. An October 2012 article in BuzzFeed News suggested there were internal tensions in the organisation in the year after Andrew Breitbart's death as staffers battled for ownership of his legacy.

Before his death, Andrew Breitbart had begun a redesign of the Breitbart News website to transform it from a links-aggregator into a more tabloid-style website. The redesign was launched shortly after his death in March 2012.

In February 2014, Bannon announced the addition of approximately 12 staff members and the opening of Texas and London-based operations. The new offices were the beginning of an expansion plan that included the addition of a new regional site roughly every 90 days, with new locations to include Florida, California, Cairo, and Jerusalem. According to a 2014 Pew Research Center study, 3% of respondents got their news from Breitbart in a typical week, and 79% of its audience reported having political values that are right-of-center.

Under Bannon's management, Breitbart News aligned with the American alt-right, the European populist right, the pan-European nationalist identitarian movement, and the counter-jihad movement. Bannon declared the website "the platform for the alt-right" in 2016, but denied all allegations of racism and later stated that he rejected what he called the "ethno-nationalist" tendencies of the alt-right movement. One of Bannon's coworkers said he wasn't referring to Richard Spencer but instead to "the trolls on Reddit or 4Chan". The owners of Breitbart News deny that their website has any connection to the alt-right or has ever supported racist or white supremacist views. Anthony R. DiMaggio has described these denials as "gaslighting".

Breitbart News spokesperson Kurt Bardella stated in 2015 that the site "is a for-profit operation". The company's investors include computer scientist and hedge fund CEO Robert Mercer. Editors commented in 2015 that the site is a "private company and we don't comment on who our investors or backers are." According to the Los Angeles Times, web traffic is vital to the company as it supports itself from advertising revenue.

==== Support for Donald Trump's 2016 presidential campaign ====
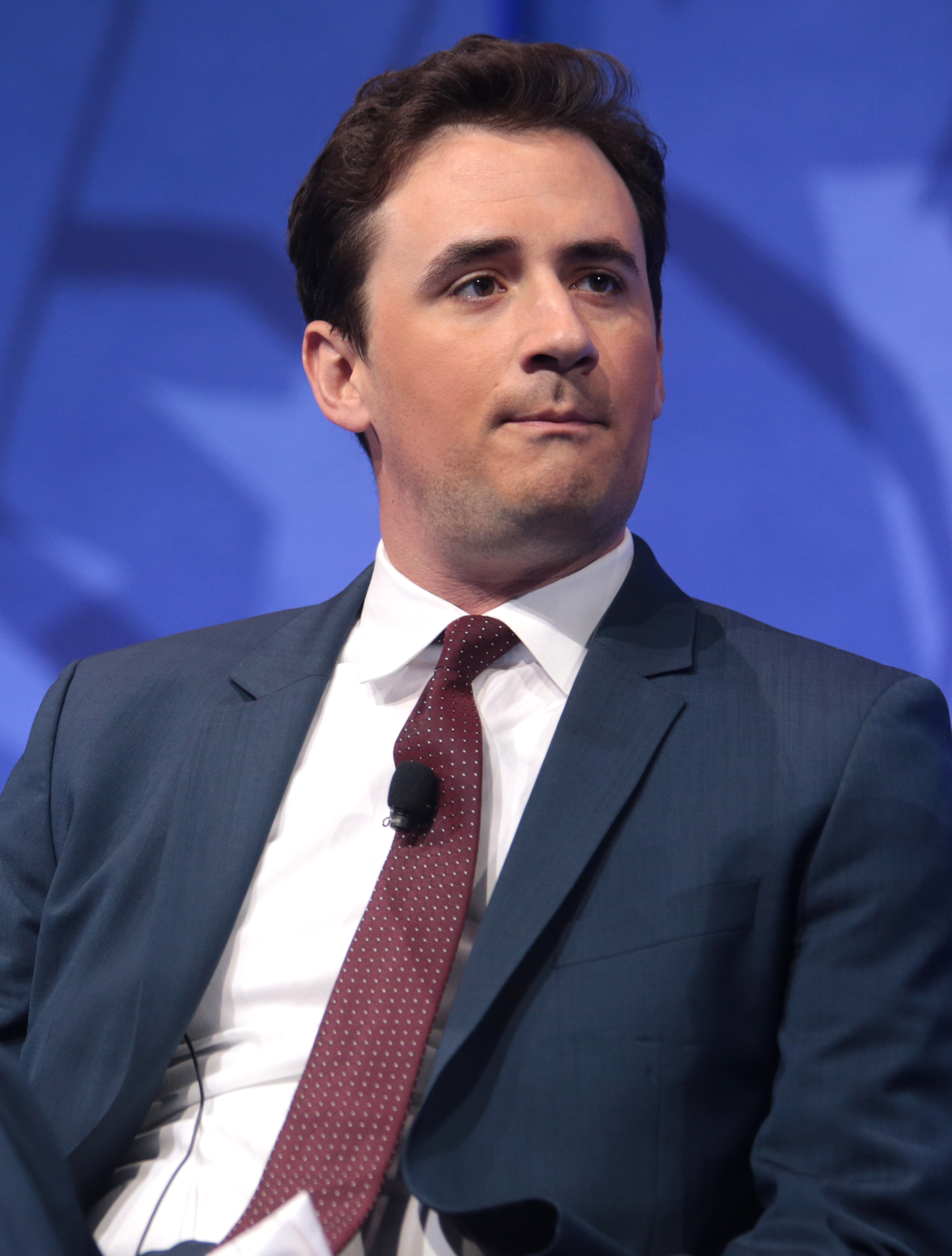
Alex Marlow, editor-in-chief of Breitbart News

Breitbart News strongly supported Donald Trump in the 2016 United States presidential election. In July 2015, Politico reported that Ted Cruz "likely has the Republican presidential field's deepest relationship with the Breitbart machine." In August 2015, an article in BuzzFeed reported that several anonymous Breitbart News staffers claimed that Donald Trump had paid for favorable coverage on the site. The site's management strongly denied the charge. In March 2016, Lloyd Grove of The Daily Beast characterized the website as "Trump-friendly", writing that Breitbart News "regularly savages the GOP establishment, the media elite, the Washington consultant class, and the Fox News Channel."

On March 11, 2016, Breitbart News reporter Michelle Fields filed a battery complaint against Donald Trump's campaign manager, Corey Lewandowski, alleging that Lewandowski had grabbed her and bruised her while she was attempting to ask a question at an event. After claiming that Breitbart News's management was not sufficiently supportive of Fields, Breitbart's editor-at-large Ben Shapiro and Fields resigned. A Breitbart News article published on March 14, 2016, accused Shapiro of betraying Breitbart News's readers; the article was subsequently removed from the website. The editor-at-large at the time, Joel Pollak, apologized for writing the article, saying he had done so in an attempt "to make light of a significant company event". The website's spokesperson Kurt Bardella also resigned following the incident, objecting to the company's handling of the incident and its favorable coverage of Trump. By March 14, several top executives and journalists at Breitbart News had resigned, with The New York Times saying that "Breitbart's unabashed embrace of Mr. Trump, particularly at the seeming expense of its own reporter, struck them as a betrayal of its mission." Former employees accused Bannon of having "turned a website founded on anti-authoritarian grounds into a de facto propaganda outlet for Mr. Trump."

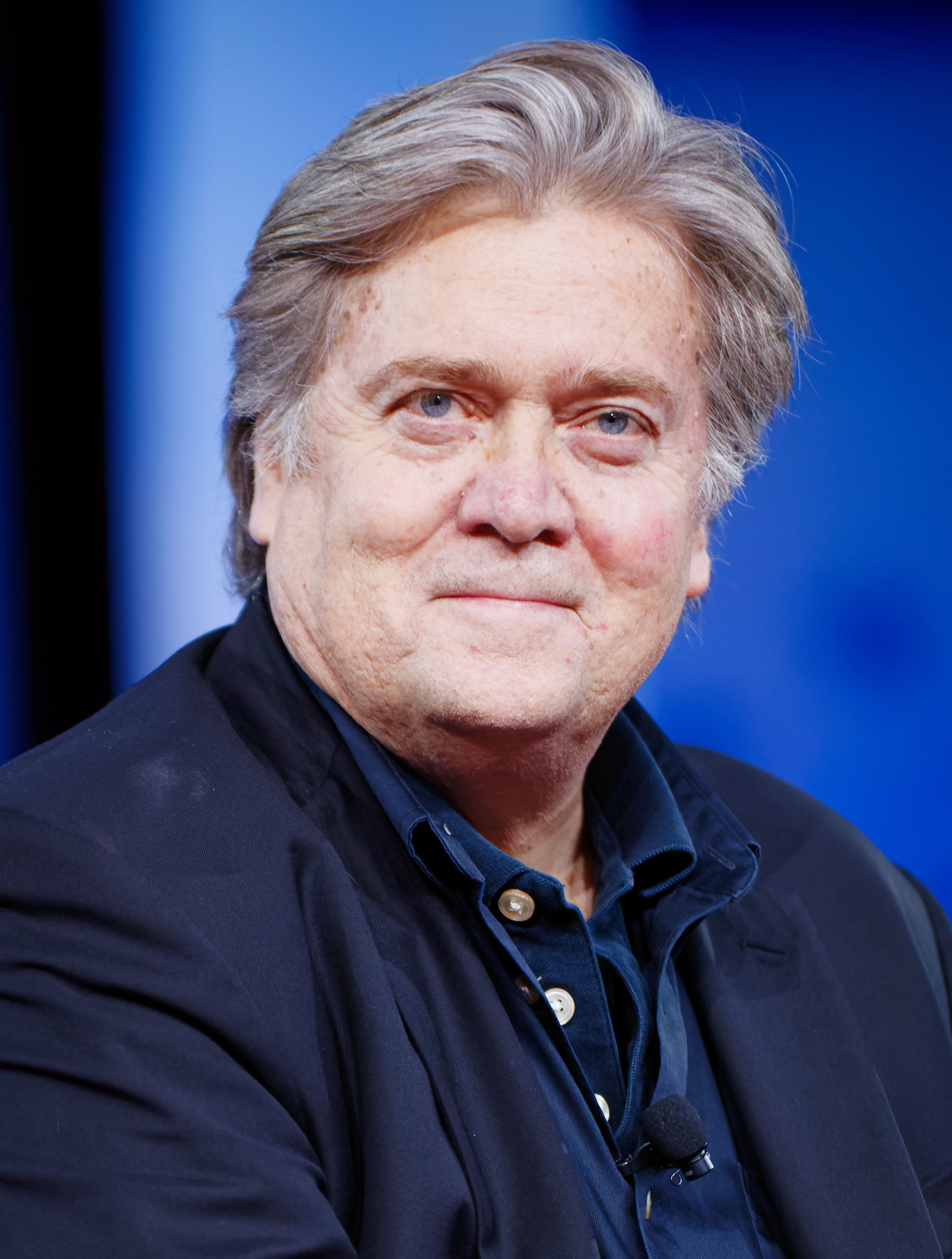
Steve Bannon at the 2017 Conservative Political Action Conference

On August 17, 2016, Bannon stepped down from his role as executive chairman to join the Trump campaign as its new CEO.

On August 25, Trump's opponent Hillary Clinton criticized him for hiring Bannon as his CEO in her rally in Reno, Nevada. She quoted the Southern Poverty Law Center's view that the site embraces "ideas on the extremist fringe of the conservative right. Racist ideas." She also said that the "de facto merger between Breitbart and the Trump campaign represents a landmark achievement for the alt-right". She also condemned the site as "the Democratic Party's media enemy No. 1" and "racist, radical and offensive".

A 2017 study by the Berkman Klein Center for Internet & Society at Harvard University found that Breitbart News was the most shared source by Trump supporters on Twitter during the election.

=== 2016–present: after the 2016 election ===
In November 2016, the cereal manufacturer Kellogg's announced they would no longer advertise on Breitbart News, saying the site was not "aligned with [their] values". In response, Breitbart announced plans to boycott the company. Breitbart announced they would be willing to go to "war" with Kellogg's over its decision to remove ads from the site.

In January 2017, editor Julia Hahn resigned from Breitbart News to work as special assistant to president Donald Trump.

Milo Yiannopoulos, who had served as a senior editor of Breitbart News since 2014, resigned from the company on February 21, 2017, after a video of him making controversial statements in relation to hebephilia surfaced.

Allies of Donald Trump's son-in-law and senior advisor Jared Kushner complained to Trump in April 2017 after Breitbart published several unflattering articles about Kushner. Shortly afterwards, the site's senior editors asked staffers to stop writing stories critical of Kushner.

Bannon was appointed White House Chief Strategist in the administration of US President Donald Trump and served in that role for seven months; he was dismissed from the White House on August 17, 2017. That same day, he was again appointed executive chairman of Breitbart News. In January 2018, Breitbart News announced that Bannon had stepped down from his position as executive chairman.

In October 2019, Facebook announced that Breitbart News would be included as a "trusted source" in its Facebook News feature alongside sources like The New York Times and The Washington Post. The decision sparked controversy due to Breitbart's status as a platform for the alt-right and its reputation for publishing misinformation. In October 2021, The Wall Street Journal reported that Facebook executives resisted removing Breitbart News from Facebook's News Tab feature to avoid angering Donald Trump and Republican members of Congress, despite criticism from Facebook employees.

==== Decline in advertisers and readership ====
From November 2016 to June 2017, Breitbart's readership fell faster than other news sites. In the two months from April to June 2017, the site lost about 90% of its advertisers. The decline coincided with boycotts aimed at getting advertisers to stop running ads on the site. The boycotts were mainly organized by the anonymous online group Sleeping Giants, which said on June 5 that 2,200 organizations had committed to stop advertising on Breitbart News (and similar sites) due to its controversial positions. Soon thereafter, Breitbart News trimmed prominently displayed, overtly racist content and fired contributor Katie McHugh for posting Islamophobic tweets about the 2017 London Bridge attack.

By 2019, Breitbart had lost nearly 75% of its readership, going from 17.3 million monthly readers at the beginning of 2017 to 4.6 million in May 2019. By October 2024, its monthly readership had declined to around 700,000.

== Content and coverage ==
=== Accuracy and ideology ===
Breitbart News is a far-right American news, opinion, and commentary website. Some news outlets describe it as a conservative news outlet or as part of the alt-right. One of the site's objectives is to court millennial conservatives. It supported Donald Trump's 2016 presidential campaign, and political scientist Matthew Goodwin described Breitbart News as being "ultra-conservative" in orientation. Breitbart News publishes articles that critique feminism, Islam, and immigration. The site has also been associated with the counter-jihad movement, having employed anti-Muslim writers such as Pamela Geller, Frank Gaffney and Robert Spencer.

In August 2017, Joel Pollak, who served as senior editor-at-large for Breitbart News at the time, described the "mission" of Breitbart News in this way: "#WAR has been our motto since the days of Andrew Breitbart, and we use it whenever we go to war against our three main targets, which are, in order: Hollywood and the mainstream media, number one; the Democratic Party and the institutional left, number two; and the Republican establishment in Washington, number three."

Breitbart News has published a number of falsehoods and conspiracy theories, as well as intentionally misleading stories, including a story that the Obama administration had supported ISIS during insurgency against the Syrian regime. It has sometimes published these misleading stories as part of an intentional strategy to manipulate media narratives via disinformation. In July 2010, Shirley Sherrod was fired from her appointed position as Georgia State Director of Rural Development for the United States Department of Agriculture. Her firing was largely in response to coverage in Breitbart News of video excerpts from her address to an event of the National Association for the Advancement of Colored People (NAACP) in March 2010, though it was later picked up by Fox News. Both NAACP and White House officials apologized for their statements after a longer version of her address was reviewed.

In April 2016, Stephen Piggott wrote in a Southern Poverty Law Center blog that the "outlet has undergone a noticeable shift toward embracing ideas on the extremist fringe of the conservative right" and was using "racist", "anti-Muslim" and "anti-immigrant ideas". Piggott wrote that the website was openly promoting, and had become associated with, the beliefs of the alt-right. Breitbart News has published material that has been called misogynist, xenophobic, and racist. The owners of Breitbart News deny their website has any connection to the alt-right.

The Anti-Defamation League described Breitbart News as "the premier website of the alt-right" representing "white nationalists and unabashed anti-Semites and racists." The Zionist Organization of America rejected accusations of antisemitism, saying that Breitbart News instead "bravely fights against anti-Semitism" and called for the ADL to apologize. An article in The Jewish Daily Forward argued that Bannon and Andrew Breitbart are antisemitic. An article by Shmuley Boteach in The Hill disputed the allegations, arguing that Breitbart defends Israel against antisemitism. Alex Marlow, editor-in-chief of Breitbart News, denies that Breitbart is a "hate-site", stating "that we're consistently called anti-Semitic despite the fact that we are overwhelmingly staffed with Jews and are pro-Israel and pro-Jewish. That is fake news." Science magazine called Breitbart "a far-right site that avoids explicit white nationalism."

Breitbart News has had staff members associated with white supremacists. An exposé by BuzzFeed News published in October 2017 documented how Breitbart solicited story ideas and copy edits from white supremacists and neo-Nazis via the intermediation of Milo Yiannopoulos. Yiannopoulos, together with other Breitbart News employees, developed and marketed the values and tactics of these groups and attempted to make them palatable to a broader audience. According to BuzzFeed News, "These new emails and documents ... clearly show that Breitbart does more than tolerate the most hate-filled, racist voices of the alt-right. It thrives on them, fueling and being fueled by some of the most toxic beliefs on the political spectrum—and clearing the way for them to enter the American mainstream." In November 2017, British anti-fascism charity Hope Not Hate identified one of the website's writers as an administrator of a far-right Facebook group that serves as a platform for fascists and white supremacists.

In 2017, the Mueller investigation examined the role of Breitbart News in Russian interference in the 2016 United States elections and its role in both amplifying stories from Russian media and being amplified by Russian bots in social media. In 2017, a Breitbart News reporter left the company to join Sputnik.

In a 2017 survey among US readers, Breitbart News was voted the third least trustworthy source among American readers, with BuzzFeed and Occupy Democrats being lower-ranked. In an October 2018 Simmons Research survey of 38 news organizations, Breitbart News was ranked the sixth least trusted news organization by Americans in a tie with the Daily Kos, with the Palmer Report, Occupy Democrats, InfoWars and The Daily Caller being lower-ranked. An August 2019 internal Facebook study found that Breitbart News was the least trusted news source, and also ranked as low-quality, in the sources it looked at across the U.S. and Great Britain.

Breitbart News has published several articles accusing the English Wikipedia of having a left-wing and liberal bias. In March 2018, Breitbart News responded negatively to a pop-up on Facebook containing content from the Wikipedia article on Breitbart News that described the news website as "intentionally misleading", resulting in several users attempting to change the article's content. In September 2018, Wikipedia editors "deprecated" Breitbart News as a source due to its unreliability; Breitbart News can still be cited on Wikipedia as an opinion or commentary source. Breitbart News is also on Wikipedia's spam blacklist, requiring special permission for links to the website to be used.

=== Main sections ===
==== "Big Hollywood" ====
In 2008, Andrew Breitbart launched the website Big Hollywood, a group blog by individuals working in Hollywood. The site was an outgrowth of Breitbart's "Big Hollywood" column in The Washington Times, which included issues faced by conservatives working in Hollywood. In 2009, the site used audio from a conference call to accuse the National Endowment of the Arts of encouraging artists to create work in support of President Barack Obama's domestic policy. The Obama Administration and the NEA were accused of potentially violating the Hatch Act. The White House acknowledged regrets, and the story led to the resignation of a White House appointee, and new federal guidelines for how federal agencies should interact with potential grantees.

==== "Big Government" ====
Andrew Breitbart launched BigGovernment.com on September 10, 2009, with a $25,000 loan from his father. He hired Mike Flynn, a former government affairs specialist at the Reason Foundation, as Editor-in-Chief of Big Government. The site premiered with hidden camera video footage taken by Hannah Giles and James O'Keefe at Association of Community Organizations for Reform Now (ACORN) offices in various cities, attracting nationwide attention resulting in the ACORN 2009 undercover videos controversy. According to law enforcement and media analysts, the videos were heavily edited to create a negative impression of ACORN.

==== "Big Journalism" ====
In January 2010, Andrew Breitbart launched "Big Journalism". he told Mediaite: "Our goal at Big Journalism is to hold the mainstream media's feet to the fire. There are a lot of stories that they simply don't cover, either because it doesn't fit their world view, or because they're literally innocent of any knowledge that the story even exists, or because they are a dying organization, short-staffed, and thus can't cover stuff like they did before." "Big Journalism" was edited by Michael A. Walsh, a former journalism professor and Time magazine music critic.

==== "National Security" ====
BigPeace.com, which later became the "National Security" component of Breitbart News, debuted on July 4, 2010. National Security covers foreign policy, the wars in Iraq and Afghanistan, terrorism, Islamic extremism, espionage, border security, and energy issues.

==== "Breitbart Tech" ====
On October 27, 2015, the website launched "Breitbart Tech", a technology journalism subsection of the site that focuses on technology, gaming, esports, and internet culture. It was initially edited by Milo Yiannopoulos, who was recruited by Bannon, until his resignation on February 21, 2017, following the controversy surrounding questionable comments he made regarding hebephilia and the sexuality of children during two podcasts. In July 2016, Yiannopoulos was banned from Twitter after racist abuse was directed towards Ghostbusters actress Leslie Jones following Yiannopoulos's insulting tweets about her. Although Yiannopoulos's Twitter account was removed, Breitbart News has since republished the full tweet exchange and has published articles criticizing Twitter. Yiannopoulos mostly wrote about cultural issues, particularly Gamergate.

==== Radio ====
Breitbart News Daily began production on Sirius XM Patriot in 2015.

=== Regional sections ===
==== "Breitbart London" ====
Breitbart News's London edition was launched in February 2014. It was headed at the time by executive editor James Delingpole, described as a "high traffic hire" by The Spectator's Steerpike column. He co-founded it with Raheem Kassam.

==== "Breitbart Jerusalem" ====
Logo for "Breitbart Jerusalem"

On November 17, 2015, the website launched "Breitbart Jerusalem", which covers events in Israel and the wider Middle East. It is edited by Israel-based American reporter Aaron Klein. Rabbi Shmuley Boteach has been an occasional columnist.

==== "Breitbart Texas" ====
Breitbart News's Texas edition was launched in February 2014 and its editor and managing director at launch was Brandon Darby. Michael Quinn Sullivan was a founding contributor.

== Notable events ==
=== ACORN undercover videos ===
Breitbart News played a central role in the 2009 ACORN video controversy, which resulted in the reorganization of the Association of Community Organizations for Reform Now (ACORN), as well as its loss of private and government funding. Breitbart News contributor Hannah Giles posed as a prostitute fleeing an abusive pimp and seeking tax and legal advice on how to run an illegal business that included the use of underage girls in the sex trade, while James O'Keefe, another contributor, posed as her boyfriend. They clandestinely videotaped meetings with ACORN staff who "gave advice on house-buying and how to account on tax forms for the woman's income."

Andrew Breitbart paid Giles and O'Keefe $32,000 and $65,000, respectively, to film, edit and blog about the videos. Giles paid $100,000 and O'Keefe paid $50,000 to settle a lawsuit brought by former ACORN employee Juan Carlos Vera regarding the videos.

Subsequent investigations by the Brooklyn District Attorney's office and the California Attorney General found the videos were heavily edited in an attempt to make ACORN's responses "appear more sinister", and contributed to the group's demise. Clark Hoyt, The New York Times public editor, wrote, "The videos were heavily edited. The sequence of some conversations was changed. Some workers seemed concerned for Giles, one advising her to get legal help. In two cities, ACORN workers called the police. But the most damning words match the transcripts and the audio, and do not seem out of context." However, a former Massachusetts Attorney General hired to investigate the matter found no pattern of illegal conduct by the ACORN employees and said the news media should have been far more skeptical, demanding the raw video from which the edited versions were produced.

=== Shirley Sherrod's remarks at NAACP fundraiser ===
In July 2010, Breitbart News released an edited video titled "Proof NAACP Awards Racism" which featured USDA official Shirley Sherrod speaking at an NAACP fundraising dinner in March 2010. In the video, Sherrod admits to a racial reluctance to help a white farmer obtain government aid. As a result of the video, the NAACP condemned Sherrod's remarks, and U.S. government officials called on Sherrod to resign, which she did.

The NAACP later posted the longer 43-minute video of the speech. In it, Sherrod said her reluctance to help a white man was wrong, and she had ended up assisting him. The NAACP then reversed their rebuke of Sherrod, and Secretary of Agriculture Tom Vilsack apologized and offered Sherrod a new government position. Andrew Breitbart said that the point of the piece was not to target Sherrod, but said the NAACP audience's reception of some parts of the speech demonstrated the same racism the NAACP's President had accused the Tea Party movement of harboring. In 2011, Sherrod sued Andrew Breitbart and his business partner Larry O'Connor for defamation. In 2015, Sherrod and Andrew Breitbart's estate settled the case.

=== Anthony Weiner sexting scandal ===
On May 28, 2011, Breitbart News's BigJournalism website reported on a sexually explicit photo linked on New York Representative Anthony Weiner's Twitter feed. Weiner initially denied that he had sent a 21-year-old female college student the link to the photograph, but later admitted to inappropriate online relationships. On June 6, Breitbart News reported other photos Weiner had sent, including one that was sexually explicit. Two days later, the sexually graphic photo was leaked after Andrew Breitbart participated in a radio interview with hosts Opie and Anthony. Andrew Breitbart stated that the photo was published without his permission. Weiner subsequently resigned from his congressional seat on June 21.

=== "Friends of Hamas" story ===
On February 7, 2013, Ben Shapiro published an article on Breitbart News reporting allegations that former Senator and nominee for United States Secretary of Defense Chuck Hagel (R-Nebraska) may have been paid to speak at an event sponsored by a group called "Friends of Hamas". Breitbart News said that the story was based on exclusive information from U.S. Senate sources.

An investigation by Slate reporter David Weigel failed to confirm the existence of the purported group. On February 19, New York Daily News reporter Dan Friedman said that the story had originated from a sarcastic comment he had made to a congressional staffer. "Friends of Hamas" was one of several groups which Friedman considered to be so over-the-top as to be implausible and obviously fictitious. He was investigating rumors that Hagel had been paid for speaking to "controversial organizations", and asked sarcastically whether he had addressed "Friends of Hamas". Friedman followed with an email to the congressional staffer asking if Hagel had received a $25,000 fee from "Friends of Hamas" for his speaking engagement. No reply to the email was received, and the next day, Breitbart News ran a story with the headline "Secret Hagel Donor?: White House Spox Ducks Question on 'Friends of Hamas'."

Shapiro maintained that the report was accurate, claiming that the source was not Friedman. Writers for The Washington Post, New York magazine and The Daily Beast criticized Breitbart News for the "Friends of Hamas" story, calling it "wrong" and "made-up".

=== Nancy Pelosi/Miley Cyrus ad campaign ===
In April 2014, Breitbart News created an advertising campaign to launch Breitbart California, which included posters bearing an image of House minority leader Nancy Pelosi's head superimposed onto singer Miley Cyrus's body as seen twerking on California governor Jerry Brown, spoofing the 2013 VMAs. DNC Chairwoman and Florida Congresswoman Debbie Wasserman Schultz denounced the images as disrespectful to women. In response, House Majority Whip Kevin McCarthy requested that his column be removed from the site.

=== Misidentification of Loretta Lynch ===
On November 8, 2014, Breitbart News posted an article by Warner Todd Huston, which erroneously reported that Loretta Lynch, President Barack Obama's nominee for attorney general, had been part of Bill Clinton's defense team during the Whitewater scandal about the Whitewater Development Corporation. In fact, the Whitewater lawyer was a different Loretta Lynch. After this mistake was pointed out by Talking Points Memo and Media Matters for America, Breitbart News noted that the two Lynches were different people by correcting and appending the original article. Andrew Rosenthal of The New York Times editorial page editor criticized this, writing: "The appended correction didn't really do justice to the scope of the misidentification."

The American Journalism Review said "that Breitbart had let the mistaken fact stand in the headline and the article itself," and had published a second story containing the incorrect information on November 9. By November 10, the initial story had been deleted from Breitbart.com. PolitiFact rated the claim "Pants on Fire" and noted that the false claim had "already spread to other conspiracy, opinion and conservative news websites", as an example of how fast false information can spread on the Internet.

=== Conspiracy theories about President Obama ===
According to The New York Times, Breitbart News promoted the falsehood that President Obama was a Kenyan-born Muslim ("birtherism"). In Devil's Bargain, however, Joshua Green writes that Breitbart never promoted birtherism. During his time with Breitbart, former senior editor-at-large Joel Pollak denied that Breitbart News had ever "advocated the narrative of 'Birtherism.'"

In June 2016, Breitbart News falsely claimed President Obama supported terrorists.

In March 2017, Breitbart News published a story by conservative talk radio host Mark Levin claiming that Obama had wiretapped Donald Trump during his 2016 presidential campaign. President Trump repeated the claims on his Twitter feed less than 24 hours after Breitbart News ran the story.

=== Conspiracy theories about Hillary Clinton ===
During the 2016 presidential election, Breitbart News were accused by Rolling Stone magazine of promoting conspiracy theories including the debunked Pizzagate conspiracy theory, which alleged that high-ranking Democrats were involved a child sex ring. The website made unconfirmed claims about Hillary Clinton's health, including asserting she had issues caused by a supposed brain injury. A June 2016 Breitbart News article presented Stone's conspiracy theory that Clinton aide Huma Abedin was involved with terrorism.

=== False report of Muslim mob in Germany ===
On January 3, 2017, Breitbart News's Virginia Hale wrote that "At New Year's Eve celebrations in Dortmund a mob of more than 1,000 men chanted 'Allahu Akhbar', launched fireworks at police, and set fire to a historic church". According to Agence France-Presse, the story gave the impression of "chaotic civil war-like conditions in Germany, caused by Islamist aggressors". The story was later shown to be false; St. Reinold's Church is neither the oldest church in Germany nor was the church set on fire. While 1000 people did gather, which is not unusual on New Year's Eve in a public place, video footage from the scene does not show a "mob", and no policemen were targeted. The official police report recorded an "average to quiet New Year's Eve" with "no spectacular facts to report", while firefighters note an "almost normal weekend night" and state that a "safety net at the Reinoldi church caught fire by a fireworks rocket, but was quickly extinguished". Witness said it was not the church roof that was scorched, but a construction scaffolding on the church's far side, away from the crowd. The group that shouted "Allahu Akbar" consisted of only 50–70 people and was celebrating the ceasefire in Aleppo.

The false story was then subsequently picked up by an Austrian far-right website before it made its way back to Germany where politician Thorsten Hoffmann fell for it. In Germany, several newspapers reported on Breitbart News publishing the hoax and distorting facts. Breitbart News initially declined to comment, but later updated its story to state that it stood by its claims, which had been shown to be false, and the only correction issued was with regard to the church's age. On January 8, it published an article calling the criticism of its initial story "fake 'fake news'". The follow-up story used a screen capture of different fireworks at the near side of the church, with no scaffolding. Ruhr Nachrichten, the original outlet and the alleged witness cited by Breitbart News, replied to the update, and stated that Breitbart News had not contacted them or the firefighters present to verify their story. They also reiterated the accusation against Breitbart News of exaggerating minor facts to give a false "impression that a 'mob' of 1000 migrants had shot at Christian churches in Dortmund and set them on fire." The newspaper went on to accuse Breitbart News of not adhering to journalistic ethics. Ruhr Nachrichten also accused Breitbart of "using our online reports for fake news, hate and propaganda" and published video fragments recorded on site that contradicted Breitbart News's story.

=== Climate change denial ===
In November 2016, Breitbart News published an article summarizing a Daily Mail piece that falsely claimed that record-high global temperatures were unrelated to global warming. The Breitbart article, by James Delingpole, was cited by the United States House Committee on Science, Space, and Technology, for which the latter itself was criticized. Weather.com condemned the Breitbart story in an article titled "Note to Breitbart: Earth Is Not Cooling, Climate Change Is Real and Please Stop Using Our Video to Mislead Americans".

In June 2017, Breitbart News published an article by Dellingpole that claimed that 58 scientific papers disproved anthropogenic climate change. A number of scientists criticized the article, describing it as cherry-picking, derogatory, inaccurate, misleading, and employing flawed reasoning. In April 2019, Breitbart News published an article that claimed that a scientific study on past climate proved that man-made climate change was a hoax. Climate scientists sharply criticized the article, variously describing it as ignorant, misleading, and misrepresentative of the study's actual findings.

In November 2021, a study by the Center for Countering Digital Hate described Breitbart News as being among "ten fringe publishers" that together were responsible for nearly 70 percent of Facebook user interactions with content that denied climate change. Facebook disputed the study's methodology.

=== Picturing Lukas Podolski in an article about refugees ===
In August 2017, Breitbart News featured a picture of professional German soccer player Lukas Podolski in an article entitled "Spanish Police Crack Gang Moving Migrants on Jet-Skis". Podolski is neither a migrant gang member nor a victim of human trafficking. The picture was of Podolski riding a jet-ski in the summer of 2014 in Brazil. Breitbart News apologized to Podolski after the picture drew attention.

=== False story about Northern California wildfires ===
In October 2017, Breitbart News published a false story claiming that an illegal immigrant was arrested in connection with the October 2017 Northern California wildfires. Sonoma County's sheriff department responded to Breitbart's reporting, "This is completely false, bad, wrong information that Breitbart started and is being put out into the public."

=== COVID-19 misinformation ===
Breitbart News livestreamed a widely viewed video on July 27, 2020, featuring a group called America's Frontline Doctors, that made dubious claims related to the COVID-19 pandemic and touted hydroxychloroquine as a cure. The group was led by Dr. Simone Gold, reportedly a Trump supporter who has advocated the use of hydroxychloroquine on conservative talk radio and podcasts. President Donald Trump shared several versions of the video with his 84 million Twitter followers before they were taken down. The video was removed by Facebook, Twitter, and YouTube for violating policies against COVID-19 misinformation. The president's son Donald Trump Jr. was restricted from Twitter for 12 hours for sharing it. The video event was funded by the right-wing group Tea Party Patriots. The video had 14 million views and was shared 600,000 times on Facebook before it was taken down.

=== Voter fraud ===
In August 2020, a Breitbart article cited a press release by Michigan secretary of state Jocelyn Benson about the state rejecting over 800 ballots cast by voters who died before the date of the election. The article was written in a way suggesting that the ballots were not legitimately cast and thus evidence of extensive voter fraud. In fact, the voters in question died after submitting their ballots. The article was shared by Donald Trump Jr. on Twitter.

In November 2020, Breitbart News published an article alleging that "hundreds of unofficial Republican observers concerned about fraud" had been barred from observing the counting of absentee ballots in Detroit. The British disinformation analysis organization Logically found that the claim was misleading, as both Republican and Democratic poll challengers had been barred due to both parties having exceeded the law-mandated maximum of 134 challengers. The article was shared by President Donald Trump on Twitter.
