= Larry Solov =

American attorney (born 1968)

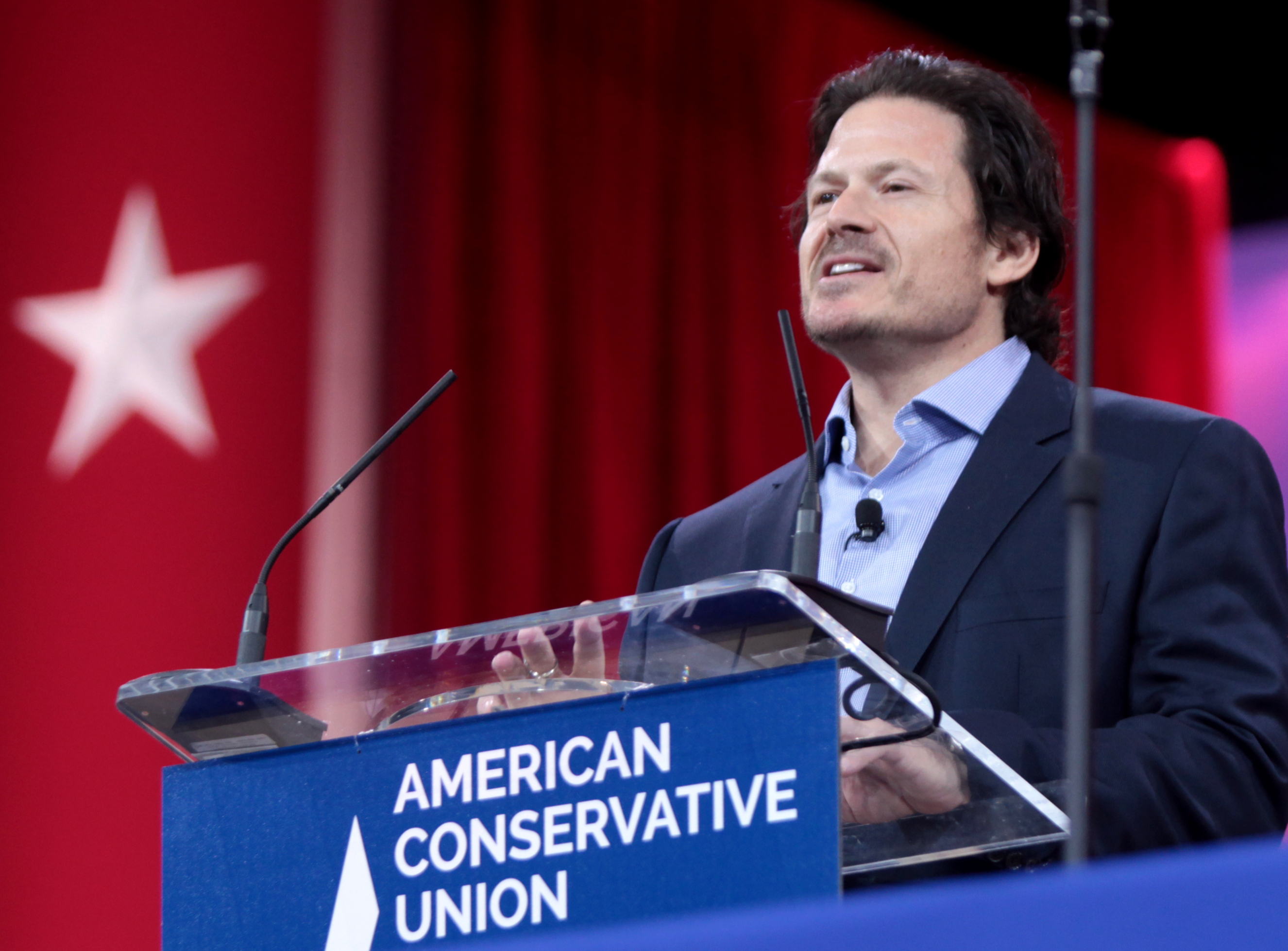
- Solov speaking at the 2015 Conservative Political Action Conference
- Born: Laurence Gregory Solov; May 20, 1968 (age 58); Los Angeles, California, U.S.
- Education: Stanford University (BA); University of California, Los Angeles (JD)
- Occupations: Attorney; CEO of Breitbart News

Laurence Gregory Solov (born May 20, 1968) is an American attorney best known as the co-founder and CEO of Breitbart News.

== Early life and education ==
Solov was born to a Jewish family in Los Angeles, the son of Joanne (née Skolnick), a social worker, and attorney Lessing Solov. His grandfather Charles Solov was born in the Russian Empire and emigrated to the United States in the early 20th century. He has a younger sister, Rachel. He graduated from Stanford University in 1990 with a degree in religious studies, followed by a J.D. degree from UCLA in 1994.

== Career ==
Solov became CEO, main owner, and president of Breitbart News after the death of Andrew Breitbart in 2012. Solov was Breitbart's childhood friend, and served as general counsel for the company from 2007.
