= Mercer Family Foundation =

Private American grant-making foundation

Coordinates: 42°21′40″N 71°15′29″W

- Formation: 14 June 2004 (22 years ago)
- Founder: Robert Mercer
- Founded at: New York City, U.S.
- Type: charitable foundation
- Tax ID no.: 20-1982204
- Legal status: 501(c)(3)
- Purpose: philanthropy
- Headquarters: 51 Sawyer Rd, Waltham, Massachusetts, 02453-3448, U.S.
- Director: Rebekah Mercer
- Disbursements: $13,492,358 (2013)

The Mercer Family Foundation is a private grant-making foundation in the United States. As of 2013, it had $37 million in assets. The foundation is run by Rebekah Mercer, the daughter of computer scientist and hedge fund manager Robert Mercer.

Under Rebekah’s leadership, the family foundation invested about $70 million into conservative causes between 2009 and 2014. Focusing on public policy, the foundation has donated to veterans charities and groups critical of climate change activism.

== Activities ==
The foundation's main interests are in the fields of public policy, higher education, and science.

The foundation has donated to organizations and institutions, including The Heritage Foundation, Illinois Policy Institute, Heartland Institute, and SUNY Stony Brook. Mercer provides funding to the Home Depot Foundation, whose mission is to "improve the homes and lives of U.S. military veterans and their families."

The Mercer Family Foundation has lobbied against efforts to fully fund the Internal Revenue Service.

The organization has been linked to the funding of Donald Trump and other U.S. far-right entities. Similar allegations have been made about links to members of the UK government.
