= Jonathan Lacoste =

American internet entrepreneur (born 1993)

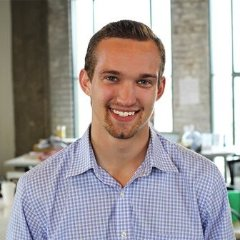
- Born: September 2, 1993 (age 33); Columbus, Ohio
- Occupations: Venture capitalist, entrepreneur

Jonathan Lacoste (born September 2, 1993) is a venture capitalist and software entrepreneur based in Austin, TX. He is the Founder & General Partner at Space.VC, an early-stage venture capital fund specialized on space, defense, and frontier tech investments. Notable investments have included SpaceX, True Anomaly, and Loft Orbital. Previously, Jonathan was the Co-Founder of Jebbit, an enterprise software company he co-founded in 2011 with university classmates. He and co-founder Tom Coburn ran the company for 12 years before being acquired by Vista Equity Partners.

== Early life and education ==
Lacoste was born and raised in Columbus, Ohio to John and Jane Lacoste along with two younger brothers, Joshua and Joel. He received his high school diploma from St. Edward High School, a private, all-male Catholic, college-preparatory high school located in Lakewood, Ohio where he now serves on the Board of Trustees. Growing up, Lacoste was a nationally ranked ice hockey goaltender. At the World Hockey Cup, Lacoste was awarded the "Bästa Målvakt" or "Best Goaltender" Award in Stockholm, Sweden. He also became the youngest goaltender to win a game in the North American Hockey League (NAHL) at the age of 16 years, 3 months for the Alpena IceDiggers. Lacoste started his academic career at Boston College, however, ended up dropping out of school after his third semester. While at Boston College, Lacoste launched Jebbit with classmates Tom Coburn and Chase McAleese.

== Space.VC ==
In early 2021, Jonathan launched Space.VC, a venture capital fund investing in space, defense & frontier tech startups. According to the firm's website, the group has invested in some of the leading space tech companies, notably including SpaceX, Loft Orbital, HawkEye 360, True Anomaly, Pixxel Space, and Hubble Network. Space.VC made several large investments into SpaceX in 2021 and 2022. Fund I had approximately $20M in assets under management.

After investing in True Anomaly as a pre-seed investor, the company announced a $100M Series B led by Riot Ventures, to continue scaling their in-space security solutions. Loft Orbital successfully announced a $140M round led primarily by Blackrock, as did Hawkeye360, announcing a $58M round led by Blackrock in 2023.

In 2024, Space.VC announced the launch of their Fund II, bringing assets under management to approximately $50M USD.

== Jebbit ==
Lacoste's co-founder, Tom Coburn, received the initial inspiration for Jebbit in an airport as he observed a Hulu TV show on his laptop and realized how infrequently he paid attention to online advertising. Coburn began tinkering around with the idea on his own and eventually entered it into the Boston College Venture Competition under the working name, Additupp. After tying for first place, Coburn teamed up with Lacoste, and together they renamed the company Jebbit and built out a team of Boston College students before ultimately leaving school early. Jebbit customers have included Dell, eBay, Cathay Pacific, Volkswagen, NFL, Live Nation, Keurig, Harvard University and many more.

Jebbit has raised more than $90 million in venture capital from Vista Equity Partners, K1 Investment Management, Manifest Investment Partners, Data Point Capital and Boston Seed Capital, as well as entrepreneurs including HubSpot founder Dharmesh Shah, DraftKings founder Jason Robins, and Acquia founder Jay Batson. Jebbit was recognized by CNBC as one of the "Top 25 Most Promising Companies in the World" as part of Global Entrepreneurship Week in 2013. In addition, Jebbit has received industry awards at the Marketer's Choice Awards and by the Massachusetts Technology Leadership Council for innovation in the digital marketing and advertising industry.

In 2019, the company closed a $12M Series B led by K1 Investment Management. In 2021, the company was acquired by Vista Equity Partners and received an additional $70M growth investment. The company continues to operate today, serving enterprise customers such as L'Oreal, Procter & Gamble, and other Fortune 500 companies.

== Recognition ==
In 2013, Lacoste became one of the youngest entrepreneurs to ever receive funding from a venture capital firm, at the age of 19.

In addition, Lacoste and the Jebbit team have been profiled in such publications and shows as Forbes, CNBC, The Boston Globe, and The Boston Business Journal. Following his inclusion in the 2015 edition of Forbes 30 Under 30 at the age of 21, Lacoste appeared on CNBC's Squawk Box to discuss Jebbit and the challenges of being a millennial entrepreneur. He was also named one of Boston Globe's 25 Under 25.

In 2022, Lacoste was recognized as one of the top 50 Emerging Venture Capitalists in the U.S. for his work with Space.VC by the venture capital media outlet, Signature Block.
